= Longest uncrossed knight's path =

Mathematical problem set on a chessboard

The longest uncrossed (or nonintersecting) knight's path is a mathematical problem involving a knight on the standard 8×8 chessboard or, more generally, on a square n×n board. The problem is to find the longest path the knight can take on the given board, such that the path does not intersect itself. A further distinction can be made between a closed path, which ends on the same field as where it begins, and an open path, which ends on a different field from where it begins.

== Known solutions ==
The longest open paths on an n×n board are known only for n ≤ 9. Their lengths for n = 1, 2, ..., 9 are:

0, 0, 2, 5, 10, 17, 24, 35, 47 (sequence A003192 in the OEIS)

The longest closed paths are known only for n ≤ 10. Their lengths for n = 1, 2, ..., 10 are:

0, 0, 0, 4, 8, 12, 24, 32, 42, 54 (sequence A157416 in the OEIS)

The longest closed path for n = 7 of length 24.	The longest open path for n = 8 of length 35.

== Generalizations ==
The problem can be further generalized to rectangular m×n boards, or even to boards in the shape of any polyomino. A restricted form of the problem for m×n boards, where n≤8 and m might be very large, was given at 2018 ICPC World Finals. It may be solved by dint of dynamic programming, helped by the insight that the solution should exhibit a cyclic behaviour.

Other standard chess pieces than the knight are less interesting, but fairy chess pieces like the camel ((3,1)-leaper), giraffe ((4,1)-leaper) and zebra ((3,2)-leaper) lead to problems of comparable complexity.

== See also ==
- A knight's tour is a self-intersecting knight's path visiting all fields of the board.
- TwixT, a board game based on uncrossed knight's paths.
