= Great chess =

Medieval chess variants

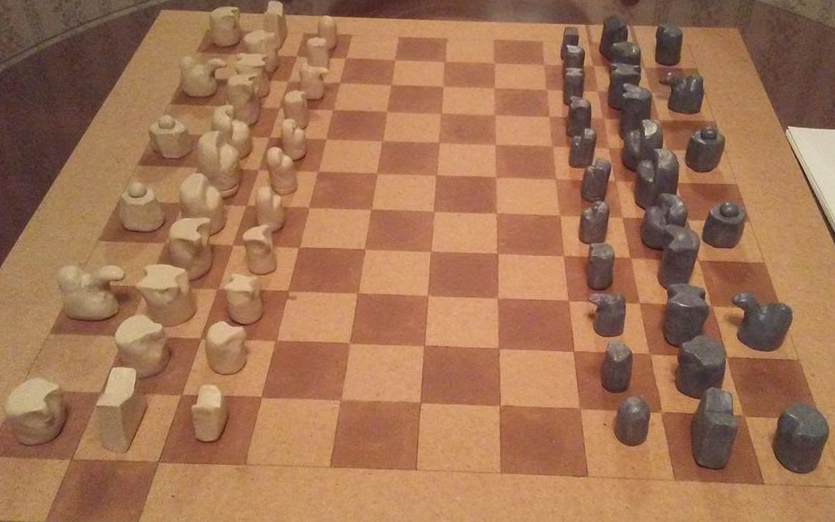
A modern reconstruction of a Tamerlane chess set. The pieces approximate the appearance of traditional pieces in 14th-century Persia.

Great chess or large chess (Arabic: shatranj al-kabir) is a family of large board historical chess variants which were played in the Middle East and Central Asia. Great chess includes variants played on larger chessboards like Tamerlane chess and Turkish great chess. These games were called "great chess" because they were played on larger boards (11×10, 13×13 etc), while shatranj as-saghir ("small chess" i.e. standard shatranj) was played on the smaller 8×8 board.

Like modern chess, these games are derived from medieval shatranj. One variant of great chess, also called Tamerlane chess, was developed in Central Asia during the reign of Emperor Timur, and its invention is also attributed to him. Although the game is similar to modern chess, it is distinctive in that there are varieties of pawn, each of which promotes in its own way.

== Early large shatranj variants ==
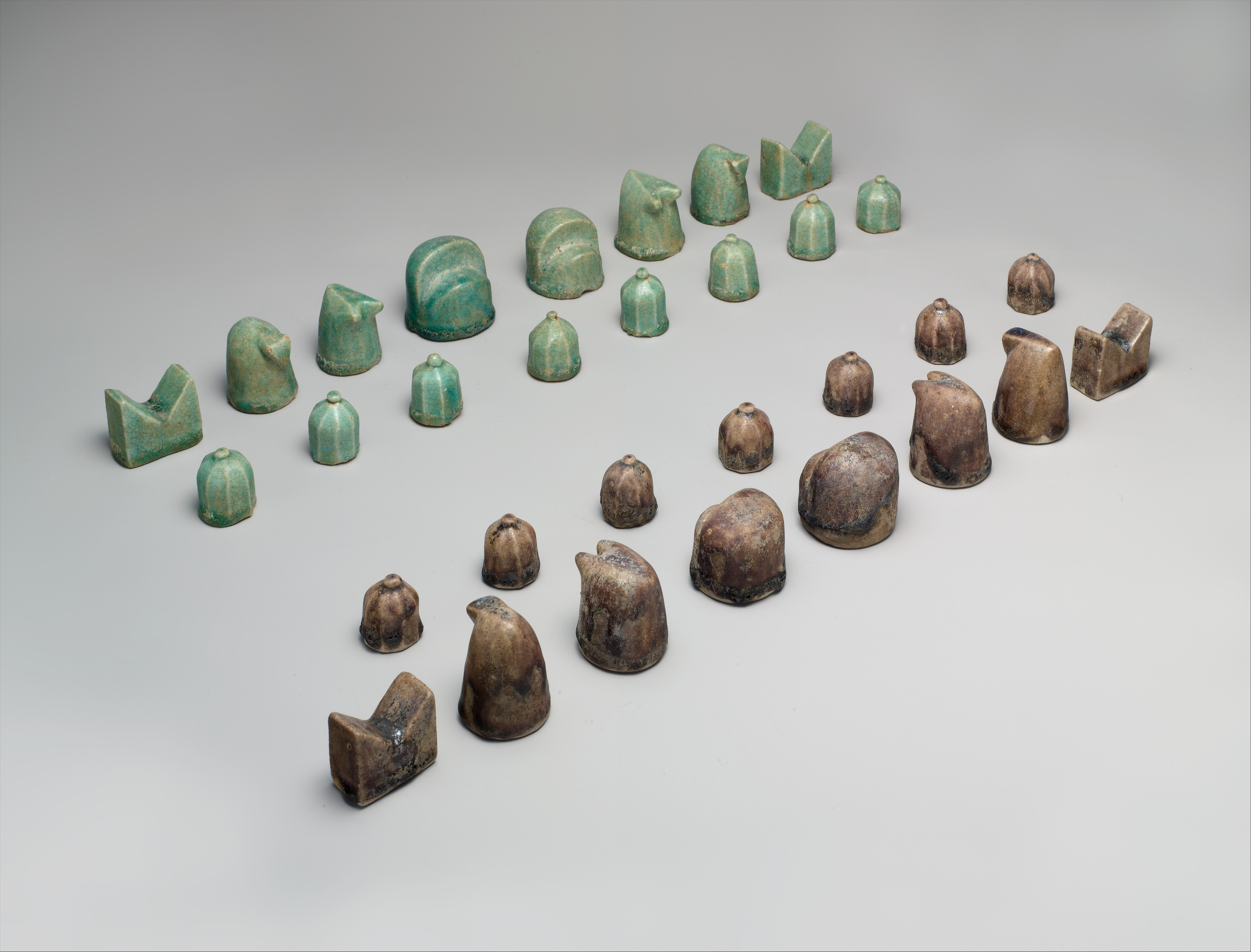
12th century Iranian shatranj set from Nishapur

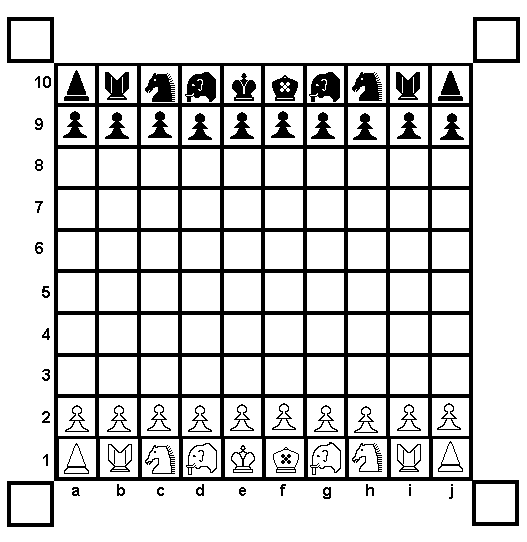
Citadel shatranj (shatranj al-husun)

Great chess variants evolved from Middle Eastern shatranj. An early large board variant of shatranj was "complete shatranj" (shatranj al-tamma) which used a board of 10×10 squares and introduced two new chessmen, which were called dabbabas (siege engine). This piece moved like a king. Ferdowsi's Shahnameh, also discusses an alternative version of complete shatranj which uses the camel (shutur) piece instead of the dabbaba.

Several other 10x10 chess variants were developed in the Muslim world. The most popular variant was citadel chess (shatranj al-husun), which is discussed in many surviving manuscripts, such as in Nafa'is al-funun (Treasury of the Sciences) by the Persian al-Amuli. This variant includes four extra squares on each corner of the board called citadels (husun). Medieval manuscripts explain that if a king reaches one of his opponent's citadels, the game is drawn. Some manuscripts depict the citadels as being attached diagonally, while others depict them as being attached directly beside the two rook squares. Other than these changes, the rules followed classical shatranj.

Citadel chess also included two dabbabas which in some versions were placed between the elephants and the king or counsellor, and in other manuscripts are depicted as being placed next to the rooks. In citadel chess, the dabbabas moved like the modern bishop.

== Tamerlane chess ==
Large board versions of shatranj led to further innovative variations in Central Asia, including various forms of great chess (shatranj al-kabir, also known as Tamerlane chess), which thrived in the Turco-Mongol empire of Timur (1320s–1405). Timur himself loved to play chess, and he preferred the large board variants over the smaller 8×8 shatranj. As such, the invention of this game has also been attributed to Timur himself. He is known to have invited the best shatranj players in the land to his court to play him at the game, including one Ali ash-Shatranji of Tabriz. Another legend regarding this type of chess is found in a Persian manuscript which may have been by ash-Shatranji himself. The legend states that this game was given to Alexander in India by Hermes.

According to the Nafa'is al-funun, Great chess uses a chessboard made up of 110 uncheckered squares arranged in a 10×11 pattern. Just as in Citadel shatranj, the board includes citadels that allows the game to end in a draw if the opposing king enters it. In great chess, two citadels protrude from the left side on the ninth row and from the right side on the second row, making a total of 112 squares. Great chess included the classic shatranj army along with two dabbabas and two camels, pieces that had also been seen in earlier 10x10 shatranj variants.

=== Pieces ===
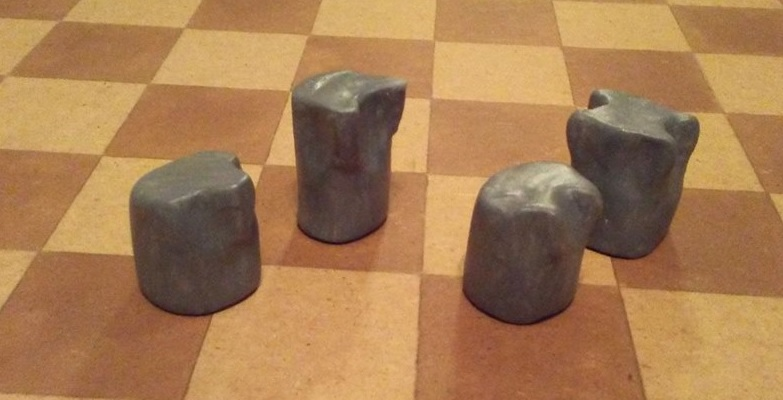
Left to right: the faras (knight), zurafa (giraffe), pil (elephant), and tali'a (picket)

These are the pieces of great chess:

- The king (shah) moves as a modern king, but once during the game it may switch places with any of its own pieces to evade check/checkmate or stalemate.
- The general or counsellor (ferz) moves one square diagonally.
- The vizier or governor (wazir) moves one square horizontally or vertically.
- The giraffe (zurafa) moves one square diagonally and then a minimum of three squares horizontally or vertically (without jumping over pieces).
- The scout or vanguard (tali'a) moves as a bishop in modern chess, but must move a minimum of two squares.
- The horse or knight (faras) moves as a knight in modern chess.
- The rook (rukh) moves as a rook in modern chess.
- The elephant (pil) jumps two squares diagonally and is unobstructed by pieces in between.
- The camel (jamal/shutur) leaps three squares orthogonally and 1 step at a right angle, like an extended knight's move. In other words, it moves in an "L"-shape, like an orthodox chess knight, with dimensions 3×1 instead of 2×1.
- The war engine (dabbaba) leaps two squares horizontally or vertically, unobstructed by pieces in between.
- The pawns move as pawns in modern chess, but with no initial double move or en passant capture. Every piece (including the pawn) has a corresponding pawn. Hence; there is: (1) a pawn of pawns, (2) a pawn of dabbabas, (3) a pawn of camels, (4) a pawn of elephants, (5) a pawn of giraffes, (6) a pawn of king, (7) a pawn of vizier, (8) a pawn of counselor, (9) a pawn of scouts, (10) a pawn of horses, and (11) a pawn of rooks.

=== Opening setup ===
There are several ways for an opening setup to be arranged. A common one is as follows:

- White's side (bottom row, from the left): elephant, (space), camel, (space), war machine, (space), war machine, (space), camel, (space), elephant.
- Second row (from the left): rook, knight, picket, giraffe, general, king, vizier, giraffe, picket, knight, rook.
- Third row (from the left): pawn of pawns, pawn of war engines, pawn of camels, pawn of elephants, pawn of general, pawn of king, pawn of vizier, pawn of giraffes, pawn of pickets, pawn of knights, pawn of rooks.

The vizier is on the right side of the king, while the ferz is on the left.

Tamerlane chessboard arrays

| | | a | b | c | d | e | f | g | h | i | j | k |
| 10 | | a9 ed | b9 | c9 sd | d9 | e9 md | f9 | g9 md | h9 | i9 sd | j9 | k9 ed | | 10 |
| 9 | x2 | a8 rd | b8 nd | c8 bd | d8 Gd | e8 gd | f8 kd | g8 qd | h8 Gd | i8 bd | j8 nd | k8 rd | | 9 |
| 8 | | a7 pd | b7 pd | c7 pd | d7 pd | e7 pd | f7 pd | g7 pd | h7 pd | i7 pd | j7 pd | k7 pd | | 8 |
| 7 | | a6 | b6 | c6 | d6 | e6 | f6 | g6 | h6 | i6 | j6 | k6 | | 7 |
| 6 | | a5 | b5 | c5 | d5 | e5 | f5 | g5 | h5 | i5 | j5 | k5 | | 6 |
| 5 | | a4 | b4 | c4 | d4 | e4 | f4 | g4 | h4 | i4 | j4 | k4 | | 5 |
| 4 | | a3 | b3 | c3 | d3 | e3 | f3 | g3 | h3 | i3 | j3 | k3 | | 4 |
| 3 | | a2 pl | b2 pl | c2 pl | d2 pl | e2 pl | f2 pl | g2 pl | h2 pl | i2 pl | j2 pl | k2 pl | | 3 |
| 2 | | a1 rl | b1 nl | c1 bl | d1 Gl | e1 ql | f1 kl | g1 gl | h1 Gl | i1 bl | j1 nl | k1 rl | x1 | 2 |
| 1 | | a0 el | b0 | c0 sl | d0 | e0 ml | f0 | g0 ml | h0 | i0 sl | j0 | k0 el | | 1 |
| | | a | b | c | d | e | f | g | h | i | j | k |

The "masculine" array

| | | a | b | c | d | e | f | g | h | i | j | k |
| 10 | | a9 ed | b9 | c9 sd | d9 | e9 gd | f9 kd | g9 qd | h9 | i9 sd | j9 | k9 ed | | 10 |
| 9 | x2 | a8 rd | b8 nd | c8 bd | d8 Gd | e8 md | f8 pd | g8 md | h8 Gd | i8 bd | j8 nd | k8 rd | | 9 |
| 8 | | a7 pd | b7 pd | c7 pd | d7 pd | e7 pd | f7 | g7 pd | h7 pd | i7 pd | j7 pd | k7 pd | | 8 |
| 7 | | a6 | b6 | c6 | d6 | e6 | f6 | g6 | h6 | i6 | j6 | k6 | | 7 |
| 6 | | a5 | b5 | c5 | d5 | e5 | f5 | g5 | h5 | i5 | j5 | k5 | | 6 |
| 5 | | a4 | b4 | c4 | d4 | e4 | f4 | g4 | h4 | i4 | j4 | k4 | | 5 |
| 4 | | a3 | b3 | c3 | d3 | e3 | f3 | g3 | h3 | i3 | j3 | k3 | | 4 |
| 3 | | a2 pl | b2 pl | c2 pl | d2 pl | e2 pl | f2 | g2 pl | h2 pl | i2 pl | j2 pl | k2 pl | | 3 |
| 2 | | a1 rl | b1 nl | c1 bl | d1 Gl | e1 ml | f1 pl | g1 ml | h1 Gl | i1 bl | j1 nl | k1 rl | x1 | 2 |
| 1 | | a0 el | b0 | c0 sl | d0 | e0 ql | f0 kl | g0 gl | h0 | i0 sl | j0 | k0 el | | 1 |
| | | a | b | c | d | e | f | g | h | i | j | k |

The "feminine" array

| | | a | b | c | d | e | f | g | h | i | j | k |
| 10 | | a9 ed | b9 | c9 sd | d9 | e9 gd | f9 kd | g9 qd | h9 | i9 sd | j9 | k9 ed | | 10 |
| 9 | x2 | a8 rd | b8 nd | c8 md | d8 bd | e8 Gd | f8 pd | g8 Gd | h8 bd | i8 md | j8 nd | k8 rd | | 9 |
| 8 | | a7 pd | b7 pd | c7 pd | d7 pd | e7 pd | f7 | g7 pd | h7 pd | i7 pd | j7 pd | k7 pd | | 8 |
| 7 | | a6 | b6 | c6 | d6 | e6 | f6 | g6 | h6 | i6 | j6 | k6 | | 7 |
| 6 | | a5 | b5 | c5 | d5 | e5 | f5 | g5 | h5 | i5 | j5 | k5 | | 6 |
| 5 | | a4 | b4 | c4 | d4 | e4 | f4 | g4 | h4 | i4 | j4 | k4 | | 5 |
| 4 | | a3 | b3 | c3 | d3 | e3 | f3 | g3 | h3 | i3 | j3 | k3 | | 4 |
| 3 | | a2 pl | b2 pl | c2 pl | d2 pl | e2 pl | f2 | g2 pl | h2 pl | i2 pl | j2 pl | k2 pl | | 3 |
| 2 | | a1 rl | b1 nl | c1 ml | d1 bl | e1 Gl | f1 pl | g1 Gl | h1 bl | i1 ml | j1 nl | k1 rl | x1 | 2 |
| 1 | | a0 el | b0 | c0 sl | d0 | e0 ql | f0 kl | g0 gl | h0 | i0 sl | j0 | k0 el | | 1 |
| | | a | b | c | d | e | f | g | h | i | j | k |

The third array

=== Rules ===
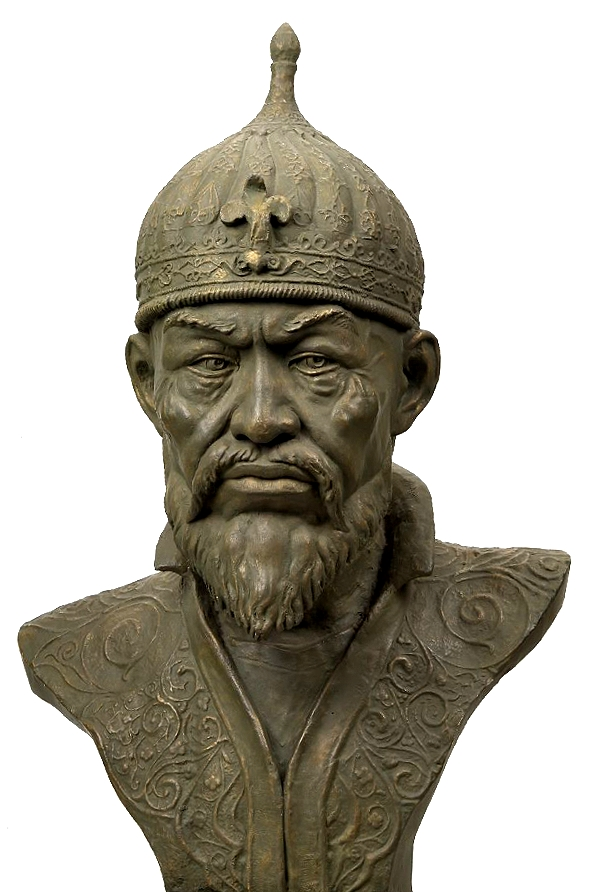
Timur The Conqueror, the eponym of the game

The objective of Tamerlane chess, as in modern chess, is to checkmate the opposing shah (king). Unlike in modern chess, stalemating an opponent is also a win.

Once during the game a player may exchange a checked king for another non-royal piece. A player may move into check if he holds multiple kings. There is no castling or en passant moves in Tamerlane chess. Baring the opponent's king is not considered a win in Tamerlane chess, as the bared king still has the chance to enter the opponent's citadel. There is no three-fold repetition or 50-move draw in Tamerlane chess.

==== The citadels ====
The two extra squares that protrude from the left of the ninth rank and the right of the second rank are called citadels (husun, singular hisn). If, at any time during the game a player can move his king into his opponent's citadel, he can declare the game a draw. This is advantageous for a losing player as being stalemated is considered a loss in Tamerlane chess. Alternatively, if a player has a prince or adventitious king on the board when his shah enters his opponent's citadel, his shah can trade places with either of those pieces, and the game continues. The prince or adventitious king can later move out of the citadel to make way for the king to enter again, but the exchange privilege may only be used once.

The shah (king) ranks higher than the prince, which ranks higher than the adventitious king. Only the highest ranking of the three on the board can enter the opponent's citadel.

The adventitious king has the special honor of being the only piece on the board that can enter his own citadel. Upon entering, it becomes immune, thus blocking the opponent from entering the citadel and declaring a draw.

==== Pawn promotion ====
Each pawn was unique, and upon reaching the last rank on the board, a pawn is promoted to its corresponding piece. Thus, the pawn of giraffes becomes a giraffe, etc. Because of this, each pawn was usually a miniature version of its corresponding piece instead of being an identical interchangeable pawn chess piece. The exceptions to this rule are the pawn of kings and pawn of pawns.

A pawn of kings becomes a prince (shahzada) which moves like a king. If both a prince and a king exist simultaneously on the board, one of the two must be captured (like a regular piece) before the other can be checked/checkmated or stalemated to win the game.

When the pawn of pawns reaches the last rank, it stays there and cannot be taken. As soon as a situation develops where the opponent cannot escape losing a piece to a pawn, or where a pawn may attack two opposing units simultaneously (forked), the player must move his/her pawn to that location. It moves to this location even if the square is occupied, either by an allied or opposing piece. The piece occupying the square is removed from the board. On the pawn's next move, it may capture any piece it is attacking. It then continues forward on the board as a pawn. Upon the second promotion of this pawn, it moves to the starting point of the pawn of king. Upon the third promotion it becomes an adventitious king, which has the moves of the king, with one special exception as described in the previous section. If an adventitious king exists on the board simultaneously with a prince and/or a king, they must be captured like a regular piece until only one remains, which must then be checkmated or stalemated to win.

=== Great chess completed ===
In a few manuscripts, the empty squares on the back rank are filled with several new types of pieces and this variant has been called "great chess completed". The following setup appears in manuscript 7322 (British Museum) which reproduces the work of Timur biographer Arabshah (15th century):

| | | a | b | c | d | e | f | g | h | i | j | k |
| 10 | | a9 ed | b9 zd | c9 sd | d9 Ud | e9 md | f9 wd | g9 md | h9 Ud | i9 nd | j9 zd | k9 ed | | 10 |
| 9 | x2 | a8 rd | b8 nd | c8 bd | d8 Gd | e8 td | f8 kd | g8 qd | h8 Gd | i8 bd | j8 nd | k8 rd | | 9 |
| 8 | | a7 pd | b7 pd | c7 pd | d7 pd | e7 pd | f7 pd | g7 pd | h7 pd | i7 pd | j7 pd | k7 pd | | 8 |
| 7 | | a6 | b6 | c6 pd | d6 | e6 | f6 pd | g6 | h6 | i6 pd | j6 | k6 | | 7 |
| 6 | | a5 | b5 | c5 | d5 | e5 | f5 | g5 | h5 | i5 | j5 | k5 | | 6 |
| 5 | | a4 | b4 | c4 | d4 | e4 | f4 | g4 | h4 | i4 | j4 | k4 | | 5 |
| 4 | | a3 | b3 | c3 pl | d3 | e3 | f3 pl | g3 | h3 | i3 pl | j3 | k3 | | 4 |
| 3 | | a2 pl | b2 pl | c2 pl | d2 pl | e2 pl | f2 pl | g2 pl | h2 pl | i2 pl | j2 pl | k2 pl | | 3 |
| 2 | | a1 rl | b1 nl | c1 bl | d1 Gl | e1 ql | f1 kl | g1 tl | h1 Gl | i1 bl | j1 nl | k1 rl | x1 | 2 |
| 1 | | a0 el | b0 zl | c0 nl | d0 Ul | e0 ml | f0 wl | g0 ml | h0 Ul | i0 sl | j0 zl | k0 el | | 1 |
| | | a | b | c | d | e | f | g | h | i | j | k |

Tamerlane chessboard in the full array

Pieces:

- elephant (a1), lion (b1), knight (c1), bull (d1), war engine (e1), revealer (f1), war engine (g1), bull (h1), camel (i1), lion (j1), elephant (k1)
- rook (a2), knight (b2), picket (c2), giraffe (d2), general (e2), king (f2), sea monster (g2), giraffe (h2), picket (i2), knight (j2), rook (k2)
- pawn of pawns (a3), pawn of knights (b3), pawn of camels (c3), pawn of war engines (d3), pawn of generals (e3), pawn of kings (f3), pawn of sea monsters (g3), pawn of giraffes (h3), pawn of pickets (i3), pawn of lions (j3), pawn of rooks (k3)
- pawn of bulls (c4), pawn of revealers (f4), pawn of elephants (i4)
- lion (‘asad)
- bull (thaurs)
- revealer (kashshâf)
- sea monster (luxm)

Black's 1st, 2nd, and 3rd rows are arranged following rotation symmetry as in the standard setup: but the 4th row is arranged with reflection symmetry, so that the pawns of bulls face each other. Note that there is only one camel, but three knights (one knight replaces the missing camel). A sea monster replaces the vizier.

The manuscript does not offer guidance as to how the extra pieces move; historians have given different suggestions. Duncan Forbes suggested in 1860 that the lion should combine the moves of rook and giraffe; the bull should combine the moves of picket and giraffe; and the revealer should combine the moves of picket and rook. (He gave the picket the move of the modern bishop, thus making the revealer identical to the modern queen.) Jean-Louis Cazaux suggests instead that the extra pieces were simple leapers: the lion a (3,0)-leaper, the bull a (3,2)-leaper, and the revealer a (3,3)-leaper. Both assume that the sea monster is identical to the vizier: a (1,0)-leaper.

== Turkish great chess and other similar variants ==
Great chess seems to have remained popular in Persia and Central Asia for the following centuries. Turkish great chess was one popular descendant of Timurid great chess. This variant used an even bigger 13×13 board and introduced another unique piece called the rhino (Rh) which can move like a knight or a bishop. This great chess variant is described in a Turkish encyclopedia by Abū'r-Rafīd Muḥammad Ḥafīd Ibn-Muṣṭafā ʿĀšir published in Istanbul between 1805 and 1806.

Each player has a king, 1 counselor / ferz (moves like orthodox chess queen), 1 grand vizier (move like queen+knight, i.e. amazon), 2 gazelles (move like Timur's camel, 3-1 leaper), 2 rhinoceroses (B+N), 2 elephants, 2 horses, 2 rooks, and 13 pawns.

The starting array is as follows:

RBNRhGQKVGRhNBR

There is no castling but the king may jump like a knight one time during the whole game. This move is also lost after the first check (which the king can escape using this move). Pawns can promote to any captured piece, if there are none, they must stay on the 12th rank.

There seem to have been other traditions of similar great chess variants.

For example, Polish historian Jerzy Gizycki discusses a 12×12 Indian variant with birds, crocodiles, giraffes, lions and unicorns in his A History of Chess. He also mentions how the 15th century Uzbek poet Alisher Navoi talked of a similar Central Asian game. Similar large chess variants continued to be played in India for centuries. One such variant was known to have been played in Hyderabad and is known as Hyderabad Shatranj Kabir. It used a 12×12 board and is discussed in a Persian text known as the Sardarnama (Book of Commanders, c. 1798) which discusses various chess variants for larger boards which were also called shatranj al-kabir. Another large chess variant from an earlier time is the Spanish Grant Acedrex.
