= Grant Acedrex =

Medieval chess variant

	a	b	c	d	e	f	g	h	i	j	k	l
12	a12 black rook	b12 black champion	c12 black unicorn	d12 black giraffe	e12 black bishop	f12 black wizard	g12 black king	h12 black bishop	i12 black giraffe	j12 black unicorn	k12 black champion	l12 black rook	12
11	a11	b11	c11	d11	e11	f11	g11	h11	i11	j11	k11	l11	11
10	a10	b10	c10	d10	e10	f10	g10	h10	i10	j10	k10	l10	10
9	a9 black pawn	b9 black pawn	c9 black pawn	d9 black pawn	e9 black pawn	f9 black pawn	g9 black pawn	h9 black pawn	i9 black pawn	j9 black pawn	k9 black pawn	l9 black pawn	9
8	a8	b8	c8	d8	e8	f8	g8	h8	i8	j8	k8	l8	8
7	a7	b7	c7	d7	e7	f7	g7	h7	i7	j7	k7	l7	7
6	a6	b6	c6	d6	e6	f6	g6	h6	i6	j6	k6	l6	6
5	a5	b5	c5	d5	e5	f5	g5	h5	i5	j5	k5	l5	5
4	a4 white pawn	b4 white pawn	c4 white pawn	d4 white pawn	e4 white pawn	f4 white pawn	g4 white pawn	h4 white pawn	i4 white pawn	j4 white pawn	k4 white pawn	l4 white pawn	4
3	a3	b3	c3	d3	e3	f3	g3	h3	i3	j3	k3	l3	3
2	a2	b2	c2	d2	e2	f2	g2	h2	i2	j2	k2	l2	2
1	a1 white rook	b1 white champion	c1 white unicorn	d1 white giraffe	e1 white bishop	f1 white wizard	g1 white king	h1 white bishop	i1 white giraffe	j1 white unicorn	k1 white champion	l1 white rook	1
	a	b	c	d	e	f	g	h	i	j	k	l

Grant Acedrex starting position. From left to right, back rank pieces are: rook, lion, unicornio, giraffe, crocodile, aanca, king, crocodile, giraffe, unicornio, lion, rook.

Grant Acedrex is a medieval chess variant dating back to the time of King Alfonso X of Castile. It appears in the Libro de los Juegos of 1283.

== Rules ==
The following rules are from the reconstruction given on the website of Jean-Louis Cazaux, based on work by him and Sonja Musser. The game is played on a 12×12 board.

=== King ===
The king moves as like modern king. Its Betza notation is thus K. Castling does not exist in Grant Acedrex. However, on its first move, a king may make a diagonal or orthogonal leap of two squares (Betza notation AD) in addition to its normal moves.

=== Aanca ===
The aanca (a beautiful and fearsome bird, very similar to a roc, sometimes translated incorrectly as gryphon) moves one square diagonally (like a ferz), before optionally continuing orthogonally outward any number of squares. Its Betza notation is t[FR].

	a	b	c	d	e	f	g	h	i	j	k	l
12	a12	b12	c12	d12	e12 up arrow	f12	g12 up arrow	h12	i12	j12	k12	l12	12
11	a11	b11	c11	d11	e11 up arrow	f11	g11 up arrow	h11	i11	j11	k11	l11	11
10	a10	b10	c10	d10	e10 up arrow	f10	g10 up arrow	h10	i10	j10	k10	l10	10
9	a9	b9	c9	d9	e9 up arrow	f9	g9 up arrow	h9	i9	j9	k9	l9	9
8	a8	b8	c8	d8	e8 up arrow	f8	g8 up arrow	h8	i8	j8	k8	l8	8
7	a7 left arrow	b7 left arrow	c7 left arrow	d7 left arrow	e7 black circle	f7	g7 black circle	h7 right arrow	i7 right arrow	j7 right arrow	k7 right arrow	l7 right arrow	7
6	a6	b6	c6	d6	e6	f6 white wizard	g6	h6	i6	j6	k6	l6	6
5	a5 left arrow	b5 left arrow	c5 left arrow	d5 left arrow	e5 black circle	f5	g5 black circle	h5 right arrow	i5 right arrow	j5 right arrow	k5 right arrow	l5 right arrow	5
4	a4	b4	c4	d4	e4 down arrow	f4	g4 down arrow	h4	i4	j4	k4	l4	4
3	a3	b3	c3	d3	e3 down arrow	f3	g3 down arrow	h3	i3	j3	k3	l3	3
2	a2	b2	c2	d2	e2 down arrow	f2	g2 down arrow	h2	i2	j2	k2	l2	2
1	a1	b1	c1	d1	e1 down arrow	f1	g1 down arrow	h1	i1	j1	k1	l1	1
	a	b	c	d	e	f	g	h	i	j	k	l

Move of the aanca

=== Unicornio ===
The unicornio (the illustration on the medieval codex shows a rhinoceros's head) moves like a modern knight, before continuing diagonally outward any number of squares. (In H. J. R. Murray's translation, its first move is a non-capturing knight move, after which it acts as a bishop for the rest of the game.) Its Betza notation is t[NB].

	a	b	c	d	e	f	g	h	i	j	k	l
12	a12 up-left arrow	b12	c12	d12	e12	f12	g12	h12	i12	j12	k12 up-right arrow	l12	12
11	a11	b11 up-left arrow	c11	d11	e11	f11	g11	h11	i11	j11 up-right arrow	k11	l11 up-right arrow	11
10	a10 up-left arrow	b10	c10 up-left arrow	d10	e10	f10	g10	h10	i10 up-right arrow	j10	k10 up-right arrow	l10	10
9	a9	b9 up-left arrow	c9	d9 up-left arrow	e9	f9	g9	h9 up-right arrow	i9	j9 up-right arrow	k9	l9	9
8	a8	b8	c8 up-left arrow	d8	e8 black circle	f8	g8 black circle	h8	i8 up-right arrow	j8	k8	l8	8
7	a7	b7	c7	d7 black circle	e7	f7	g7	h7 black circle	i7	j7	k7	l7	7
6	a6	b6	c6	d6	e6	f6 white unicorn	g6	h6	i6	j6	k6	l6	6
5	a5	b5	c5	d5 black circle	e5	f5	g5	h5 black circle	i5	j5	k5	l5	5
4	a4	b4	c4 down-left arrow	d4	e4 black circle	f4	g4 black circle	h4	i4 down-right arrow	j4	k4	l4	4
3	a3	b3 down-left arrow	c3	d3 down-left arrow	e3	f3	g3	h3 down-right arrow	i3	j3 down-right arrow	k3	l3	3
2	a2 down-left arrow	b2	c2 down-left arrow	d2	e2	f2	g2	h2	i2 down-right arrow	j2	k2 down-right arrow	l2	2
1	a1	b1 down-left arrow	c1	d1	e1	f1	g1	h1	i1	j1 down-right arrow	k1	l1 down-right arrow	1
	a	b	c	d	e	f	g	h	i	j	k	l

Move of the unicornio

=== Lion ===
- The lion moves like a threeleaper or a camel, and can jump (a combined (3,0)-leaper and (3,1)-leaper). (In Murray's translation, it can only move as a threeleaper.) Its Betza notation is HC.

	a	b	c	d	e	f	g	h	i	j	k	l
12	a12	b12	c12	d12	e12	f12	g12	h12	i12	j12	k12	l12	12
11	a11	b11	c11	d11	e11	f11	g11	h11	i11	j11	k11	l11	11
10	a10	b10	c10	d10	e10	f10	g10	h10	i10	j10	k10	l10	10
9	a9	b9	c9	d9	e9 black circle	f9 black circle	g9 black circle	h9	i9	j9	k9	l9	9
8	a8	b8	c8	d8	e8	f8	g8	h8	i8	j8	k8	l8	8
7	a7	b7	c7 black circle	d7	e7	f7	g7	h7	i7 black circle	j7	k7	l7	7
6	a6	b6	c6 black circle	d6	e6	f6 white champion	g6	h6	i6 black circle	j6	k6	l6	6
5	a5	b5	c5 black circle	d5	e5	f5	g5	h5	i5 black circle	j5	k5	l5	5
4	a4	b4	c4	d4	e4	f4	g4	h4	i4	j4	k4	l4	4
3	a3	b3	c3	d3	e3 black circle	f3 black circle	g3 black circle	h3	i3	j3	k3	l3	3
2	a2	b2	c2	d2	e2	f2	g2	h2	i2	j2	k2	l2	2
1	a1	b1	c1	d1	e1	f1	g1	h1	i1	j1	k1	l1	1
	a	b	c	d	e	f	g	h	i	j	k	l

Move of the lion

=== Giraffe ===
- The giraffe moves like a zebra, a (3,2)-leaper. (In Murray's translation, it is a (4,1)-leaper.) Its Betza notation is Z.

	a	b	c	d	e	f	g	h	i	j	k	l
12	a12	b12	c12	d12	e12	f12	g12	h12	i12	j12	k12	l12	12
11	a11	b11	c11	d11	e11	f11	g11	h11	i11	j11	k11	l11	11
10	a10	b10	c10	d10	e10	f10	g10	h10	i10	j10	k10	l10	10
9	a9	b9	c9	d9 black circle	e9	f9	g9	h9 black circle	i9	j9	k9	l9	9
8	a8	b8	c8 black circle	d8	e8	f8	g8	h8	i8 black circle	j8	k8	l8	8
7	a7	b7	c7	d7	e7	f7	g7	h7	i7	j7	k7	l7	7
6	a6	b6	c6	d6	e6	f6 white giraffe	g6	h6	i6	j6	k6	l6	6
5	a5	b5	c5	d5	e5	f5	g5	h5	i5	j5	k5	l5	5
4	a4	b4	c4 black circle	d4	e4	f4	g4	h4	i4 black circle	j4	k4	l4	4
3	a3	b3	c3	d3 black circle	e3	f3	g3	h3 black circle	i3	j3	k3	l3	3
2	a2	b2	c2	d2	e2	f2	g2	h2	i2	j2	k2	l2	2
1	a1	b1	c1	d1	e1	f1	g1	h1	i1	j1	k1	l1	1
	a	b	c	d	e	f	g	h	i	j	k	l

Move of the giraffe

=== Crocodile ===
- The crocodile moves like the modern bishop. Its Betza notation is B.

=== Rook ===
- The rook moves like the modern rook. Its Betza notation is R.

=== Pawn ===
- The pawn moves like the modern pawn, but cannot make an initial double step or capture en passant. Its Betza notation is mfWcfF. When it reaches the other end of the board (the twelfth rank for White, or the first rank for Black), it promotes to the piece that was originally there: the exception is that a pawn promoting on the g-file becomes an aanca. For example, a pawn promoting on the a-file would become a rook.

=== Game end ===
In Grant Acedrex, a player wins by either checkmating or stalemating the opponent. A player can also win by capturing all the opponent's pieces leaving them with a bare king.

=== Using dice ===
The game could be sped up by using eight-sided dice to dictate which piece could move that turn, ranking them in the order: king (8), aanca (7), unicornio (6), rook (5), lion (4), crocodile (3), giraffe (2), and pawn (1).

== Computer engines ==
The multi-variant Chess engines Fairy-Max and Postduif can play Grant Acedrex under the XBoard or WinBoard user interface.
