= Wildebeest chess =

Chess variant

	a	b	c	d	e	f	g	h	i	j	k
10	a10 black rook	b10 black knight	c10 N d	d10 N d	e10 D d	f10 black king	g10 black queen	h10 black bishop	i10 black bishop	j10 black knight	k10 black rook	10
9	a9 black pawn	b9 black pawn	c9 black pawn	d9 black pawn	e9 black pawn	f9 black pawn	g9 black pawn	h9 black pawn	i9 black pawn	j9 black pawn	k9 black pawn	9
8	a8	b8	c8	d8	e8	f8	g8	h8	i8	j8	k8	8
7	a7	b7	c7	d7	e7	f7	g7	h7	i7	j7	k7	7
6	a6	b6	c6	d6	e6	f6	g6	h6	i6	j6	k6	6
5	a5	b5	c5	d5	e5	f5	g5	h5	i5	j5	k5	5
4	a4	b4	c4	d4	e4	f4	g4	h4	i4	j4	k4	4
3	a3	b3	c3	d3	e3	f3	g3	h3	i3	j3	k3	3
2	a2 white pawn	b2 white pawn	c2 white pawn	d2 white pawn	e2 white pawn	f2 white pawn	g2 white pawn	h2 white pawn	i2 white pawn	j2 white pawn	k2 white pawn	2
1	a1 white rook	b1 white knight	c1 N l	d1 N l	e1 D l	f1 white king	g1 white queen	h1 white bishop	i1 white bishop	j1 white knight	k1 white rook	1
	a	b	c	d	e	f	g	h	i	j	k

Wildebeest chess starting setup. For this diagram, camels are represented by inverted knights; wildebeests by dragons. In this position the white camel on h1 can move to g4 or i4; the white wildebeest can move to f3, f4, h3, or h4.

Wildebeest chess is a chess variant created by R. Wayne Schmittberger in 1987. The Wildebeest board is 11×10 squares. Besides the standard chess pieces, each side has two camels and one "wildebeest" - a piece which may move as either a camel or a knight.

The inventor's intent was "to balance the number of 'riders'—pieces that move along open lines—with the number of 'leapers'—pieces that jump". (So for each side, two knights, two camels, and a wildebeest balance two rooks, two bishops, and a queen.)

The game was played regularly in the (now defunct) correspondence game club NOST. (Note: NOST (kNights of the Square Table), formed in 1960 by Bob Lauzon and Jim France, held an annual convention and enjoyed several hundred active members.)

== Game rules ==
Pieces and pawns move and capture the same as they do in standard chess, except for two new pieces, and the pawn's ability to advance to the players' fifth ranks in a single move from either their second or third ranks. Wildebeest chess differs from the standard game in that a win can be achieved either by checkmate or stalemate. In both cases the losing side has no legal moves.

=== Camel ===
The camel is a (1,3)-leaper fairy chess piece. It moves and captures like an elongated move of a chess knight – jumping in a 2×4 (squares) rectangular pattern over any intervening men. Each camel is thus limited to squares of one color.

=== Wildebeest ===
The wildebeest moves and captures as a camel and a chess knight.

=== Pawns ===
- Pawns move as in standard chess, but instead of the usual double move they may advance orthogonally an arbitrary distance as long as the destination square is still in the mover's half of the board, even if the pawn has already moved. Leapt squares and destination square must be empty.
- En passant captures are possible and work similar as in standard chess. A pawn may move diagonally forward to a square that has been leapt by an opponent's pawn in the directly previous move, thereby capturing that pawn.
- A pawn may promote only to a queen or wildebeest.

=== Castling ===
Normal conventions apply when castling, with the only difference that the castling player can choose to slide his king one, two, three, or four squares. As in chess, the castling rook finishes on the opposite side of the king on the square adjacent.

== Fool's mate ==
C for camel, W for wildebeest.

1. Wf4 f7?? 2. Wg7#

== See also ==
- Parallel worlds chess – another chess variant by R. Wayne Schmittberger
- Omega chess – a similar chess variant adding two new pieces to equalize the number of jumping pieces (leapers) with sliding pieces (riders)
