= Wazir (chess) =

Fairy chess piece

Position: d5 black pawn, c4 black circle, d4 white upside-down rook, e4 black circle, d3 black circle

The wazir, represented by an inverted rook, may move to any marked square or capture the pawn on d5.

The wazir or vazir is a fairy chess piece that may move a single square vertically or horizontally. In notation, it is given the symbol W. In this article, the wazir is represented by an inverted rook.

== Etymology ==
The name wazīr (vazir) (Arabic/Persian: وزير from Middle Persian vichir) means "minister" in several West and South Asian languages and is found in English as vizier. Wazīr (Vazir) is also the name of the queen in Arabic, Persian, and Hindi.

== History and nomenclature ==
The wazir is a very old piece, appearing in some very early chess variants, such as Tamerlane chess. The wazir also appears in some historical large shogi variants, such as in dai shogi under the name angry boar (嗔猪 shinchō). The general in xiangqi moves like a wazir but may not leave its palace or end its turn in check.

== Value ==
Fortress positions in the rook vs. wazir endgame

a4	b4 white rook	c4 white king	d4
a3 black king	b3	c3	d3
a2 black upside-down rook	b2	c2	d2
a1	b1	c1	d1

Black to move, draw

a4	b4	c4 white rook	d4 white king
a3	b3 black king	c3	d3
a2	b2 black upside-down rook	c2	d2
a1	b1	c1	d1

Black to move, draw

The wazir by itself is not much more powerful than a pawn, but as an additional power to other pieces, it is worth about half a knight.

Three wazirs and a king can force checkmate against a bare king and two wazirs and a king can force stalemate against a bare king, but not easily.

The endgame of rook versus wazir is generally a win for the rook, but there are two drawing fortress positions for the wazir.

The ferz, despite being colorbound, is more powerful than the wazir in the opening phase of the game due to having greater mobility.

A wazir and a ferz cannot force checkmate against a bare king unless the king is significantly close to a corner that is the same color as the square of the ferz, but the combination of a knight and a wazir, that of a camel and a wazir, and that of a giraffe (the (1,4)-leaper) and a wazir can usually do so. 4.29% of the positions with knight and wazir against the bare king are fortress draws.
