= Dabbaba (chess) =

Fairy chess piece

Position: d7 black pawn, b5 black circle, d5 white upside-down rook, f5 black circle, d4 white pawn, d3 black circle

The dabbaba, represented by an inverted rook, may move to any marked square or capture the black pawn on d7.

The dabbaba, also known as the dabaaba or dabbabah, is a fairy chess piece that jumps two squares orthogonally (the directions a rook can move), leaping over any intermediate piece. In algebraic notation, it is given the symbol D.

== History and nomenclature ==
The dabbaba is a very old piece, appearing in some very early chess variants, such as Tamerlane chess.

The name dabbaba (Arabic: دَبَّابَة) means "tank" in Modern Arabic. In older Arabic, it referred to a type of medieval siege engine designed to shelter men who are digging a hole in enemy fortifications (Latin: vinea). The name has sometimes been translated as "war engine". The name dabbaba was also used for other pieces in old chess variants, such as one that moved like the modern bishop.

== Value ==
The dabbaba can access only one quarter of the squares of a chessboard. Each of the four dabbabas (shown as inverted rooks) can only move to squares of one color (either red, yellow, green, or blue).

The dabbaba by itself is not much more powerful than a pawn, but as an additional power to other pieces, it is worth about half a knight. Its value as a piece by itself is severely compromised by its being "twice-colourbound"—able to reach only a quarter of the squares on the 8×8 chessboard. Combining it with other pieces usually masks this weakness to some extent. A king and four dabbabas, with each dabbaba covering a different quarter of the chessboard, can easily force checkmate on a bare king.
