= Ko shogi =

Large-board variant of shogi, or Japanese chess

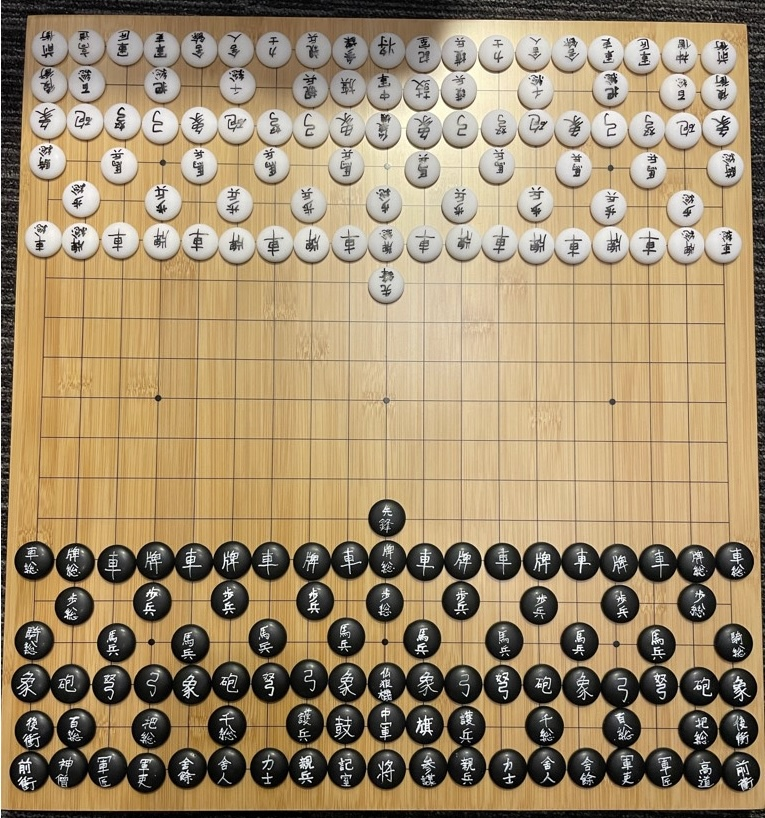
Ko shogi set showing the initial setup

Kō shōgi (広将棋 or 廣象棋 'broad chess') is a large-board variant of shogi, or Japanese chess. The game dates back to the turn of the 18th century and is based on xiangqi and go as well as shogi. Credit for its invention has been given to Confucian scholar Ogyū Sorai (1666–1728), who had also described the rules of the game in his book, Kōshōgifu (廣象棋譜).

== Rules of the game ==
Unlike standard shogi, pieces may not be dropped back into play after being captured. (This should be clear from the non-fungible equipment.) Promotion rules are complex, and the fates of several pieces are interdependent.

=== Objective ===
The objective is to capture the opponent's commanding pieces: The general, plus, if present, the governor; otherwise, the banner or middle troop.

=== Game equipment ===
Two players, Black and White, play on a go board ruled into a grid of 19 ranks (rows) by 19 files (columns) with a total of 361 intersections.

Each player has a set of 90 pieces of 34 different types. The pieces are round and flattened like go stones. In all, the players must remember 65 different moves. The pieces are generally of the same size, though black pieces may be slightly larger than white pieces.

- 1 General
- 1 Clerk
- 1 Staff officer
- 2 Aides de camp
- 2 Sumo wrestlers
- 2 Aides
- 2 Staff
- 2 Chiefs of staff
- 2 Engineers
- 1 Taoist Priest
- 1 Spiritual monk
- 2 Advance guards
- 1 Middle troop
- 1 Drum
- 1 Banner
- 2 Sentries
- 2 Millenaries
- 2 Quartermasters
- 2 Centuriae
- 2 Rear guards
- 1 Frankish cannon
- 6 Elephants
- 4 Longbows
- 4 Crossbows
- 4 Cannons
- 8 Cavalrymen
- 2 Cavalry
- 6 Pawns
- 3 Patrol units
- 6 Shields
- 3 Shield units
- 8 Chariots
- 2 Chariot units
- 1 Vanguard

Each piece has its name in the form of one or two Japanese characters marked on its face, in white on black stones and in black on white stones. On the reverse side of most pieces are other characters in red; this side is turned up to indicate that the piece has been promoted during play.

==== Table of pieces ====
Listed below are the pieces of the game and, if they promote, which pieces they promote to. *Pieces marked with asterisks are not found at setup, and only appear with promotion. Many of the translations into English are suggestions only.

Piece	Kanji	rōmaji	Promotes to	Kanji	Rōmaji
General	将	shō	—		
Clerk	記室	kishitsu	*Master at arms	軍師	gunshi
Staff officer	参謀	sambō	*Banner-and-drum	旗鼓	kiko
Aide de camp	親兵	shimpei	Quartermaster		
Sumo wrestler	力士	rikishi	—		
Aide	舎人	shajin	*Town brigade	千戸	senko
Staff	舎餘	shayo	*Village brigade	百戸	hyakko
Chief of staff	軍吏	gunri	*Vice commander	副司	fushi
Engineer	軍匠	gunshō	*Poison flame	毒火	dokka
Taoist Priest	高道	kōdō	*Five-li fog	五里霧	gorimu
Spiritual monk	神僧	shinzō	*Immaculate light ?	聖燈	shōtō
Advance guard	前衝	zenshō	*Skyward net	天網	temmō
Middle troop	中軍	chūgun	*Governor	帥	sui
Drum	鼓	ko	*Thunderclap	霹靂	hekireki
Banner	旗	ki	*Flag waver	招揺	shōyō
Sentry	護兵	gohei	Centuria		
Millenary	千総	sensō	*Dragon ascending	龍驤	ryūjō
Quartermaster	把総	hasō	*Tiger wing	虎翼	koyoku
Centuria	百総	hyakusō	*War hawk	鷹揚	yōyō
Rear guard	後衝	goshō	*Earthward net	地網	chimō
Frankish cannon	佛狼機	butsurōki	*Chariot of the Gods ?	神機車	shinkisha
Elephant	象	zō	—		
Long bow	弓	kyū	*Longbow cavalryman	彍騎	kōki
Crossbow	弩	do	*Crossbow cavalryman	弩騎	doki
Cannon	砲	hō	*Gun carriage	砲車	hōsha
Cavalryman	馬兵	bahei	Cavalry		
Cavalry	騎総	kisō	*Winged horse	天馬	temba
Pawn	歩兵	fuhyō	Patrol unit		
Patrol unit	歩総	fusō	*Commissar ?	都司	toshi
Shield	牌	hai	Shield unit		
Shield unit	牌総	haisō	*Heavenly fortress	天塁	tenrui
Chariot	車	kuruma	Chariot unit		
Chariot unit	車総	shasō	Millenary		
Vanguard	先鋒	sempō	*Commissar ?	都司	toshi

=== Setup ===
Ko Shogi

Below is a diagram showing the setup of one player's pieces. The pieces are placed on the intersecting lines of the board and not in the squares. The way one player sees their own pieces is the same way the opposing player will see their own pieces.

Board layout
+	+	+	+	+	+	+	+	+	+	+	+	+	+	+	+	+	+	+
+	+	+	+	+	+	+	+	+	VA	+	+	+	+	+	+	+	+	+
CU	SU	CH	SP	CH	SP	CH	SP	CH	SU	CH	SP	CH	SP	CH	SP	CH	SU	CU
+	PU	+	P	+	P	+	P	+	PU	+	P	+	P	+	P	+	PU	+
CA	+	HS	+	HS	+	HS	+	HS	+	HS	+	HS	+	HS	+	HS	+	CA
E	C	SB	LB	E	C	SB	LB	E	FW	E	LB	SB	C	E	LB	SB	C	E
R	FH	+	Q	+	DU	+	SN	D	MA	B	SN	+	DU	+	Q	+	FH	R
FD	SM	EN	CS	GH	SR	WR	A	SC	G	PL	A	WR	SR	GH	CS	EN	TB	FD

Legend
A - Aide de Camp	B - Banner	C - Cannon
CA - Cavalry	CH - Chariot	CS - Chief of Staff
CU - Chariot Unit	D - Drum	DU - Millenary
E - Elephant	EN - Engineer	FD - Advance Guard
FH - Centuria	FW - European Cannon	G - General
GH - Staff	HS - Cavalryman	LB - Long Bow
MA - Middle Troop	P - Pawn	PL - Staff Officer
PU - Patrol Unit	Q - Quartermaster	R - Rear Guard
SB - Crossbow	SC - Clerk	SM - Spiritual Monk
SN - Sentry	SP - Shield	SR - Aide
SU - Shield Unit	TB - Taoist Priest	VA - Vanguard
WR - Sumo wrestler		

=== Game play ===
The players alternate making a move, with Black moving first. A move consists of moving a piece on the board and potentially capturing a piece or pieces and promoting a piece or pieces. Each of these options is detailed below.

=== Movement and capture ===
An opposing piece is generally captured by displacement: That is, if a piece moves to an intersection occupied by an opposing piece, the opposing piece is displaced and removed from the board. A piece cannot move to an intersection occupied by a friendly piece (that is, a piece controlled by the same player).

Each piece in the game moves in a unique manner. Most pieces move in one of eight prime directions, either orthogonally (that is, forward, backward, or to the side, in the direction of one of the arms of a plus sign, +), or diagonally (in the direction of one of the arms of a multiplication sign, ×). At the beginning of the game the cavalryman and cavalry are exceptions in that they do not move in a prime direction. (The banner and drums, dragon ascending, war hawk, winged horse, and several other pieces are similar, but they only appear with promotion.)

Many pieces are capable of several kinds of movement, with the type of movement usually depending on the direction in which they move. The most common kinds of moves are step, range, shoot, and jump.

==== Step movers ====
Some pieces can move only one intersection at a time. (If a friendly piece, and sometimes an enemy piece, occupies an adjacent intersection, the moving piece may not move in that direction. Unlike in Go, 'adjacent' means any of eight intersections.)

The step movers at the beginning of the game are the general, aide de camp, aide, staff, chief of staff, engineer, middle troop, drum, banner, sentry, Frankish cannon, long bow, crossbow, shield, and pawn.

==== Limited range pieces ====
Some pieces can move along a limited number of free intersections along a straight line. Other than the limited distance, they move like range pieces (see below).

The limited range pieces at the beginning of the game are the chariot and the vanguard.

==== Jumping pieces ====
Several pieces can jump, that is, they can pass over an intervening piece, whether friend or foe.

The jumping pieces at the beginning of the game are the clerk, staff officer, Taoist priest, spiritual monk, cavalryman, and cavalry.

==== Ranging pieces ====
Many pieces can move any number of free intersections along a straight line, limited by the edge of the board. If an opponent's piece intervenes, it may be captured by moving to that intersection, and removing it from the board. A range piece must stop where it captures, and cannot bypass a piece in its way. If a friendly piece intervenes, the moving piece is limited to a distance that stops short of the intervening piece; if the friendly piece is adjacent, it cannot move in that direction at all.

The ranging pieces at the beginning of the game are the advance guard, millenary, quartermaster, centuria, rear guard, elephant, patrol unit, shield unit, and chariot unit.

==== Shooting pieces ====
Some pieces can shoot, that is, they can remove a piece from the board a limited distance from their location. Except for the cannon, they cannot shoot an enemy piece if another piece stands between the shooter and its target. The cannon, however, can shoot over such intervening pieces.

It is not clear if a piece must move in order to shoot. (Note: The rule that a piece must move to shoot comes from Kōshōgifugukai. The original source (Kōshōgifu) doesn't have such a rule, while it also doesn't make it clear under what circumstance a piece can shoot.)

The shooting pieces at the beginning of the game are the Taoist priest, spiritual monk, Frankish cannon, long bow, crossbow, and cannon.

==== Burn ====
Wherever a burning piece arrives at an intersection, all adjacent enemy and allied pieces are removed from the board, as described below.

The only burning piece is the poison flame, which only appears with promotion.

==== Immobilize ====
The skyward net and earthward net have the ability to immobilize enemy pieces in their ranging directions.

==== Multiple capture ====
The sumo wrestler and cavalry have double-move with double-capture abilities, similar to the 'lion move' in chu shogi. Unlike the lion, they are merely double-move pieces and do not have the ability to bypass a friendly piece occupying the first landing point. Unless stated otherwise below, the multiple moves do not need to be in the same direction and need not all be taken. A second or later move may return a piece to its starting location.

Among the promoted pieces, the master at arms, banner and drums, five-li fog, thunderclap, flag waver, dragon ascending, tiger wing, war hawk, and winged horse have multiple-capture abilities.

The Frankish cannon has a double-kill ability when it shoots.

==== Movement diagrams ====
In the diagrams below, the different types of moves are coded by symbol and by color: Blue for step moves, green for multiple capture, red for range moves, and yellow for jumps.

Notation
□	Jumps directly to this square and stops, bypassing any intervening piece, but generally may not capture with this move with only a few exceptions.
☆	Jumps directly to this square and stops, bypassing any intervening piece, and may capture.
○	Steps a limited number of squares along a straight line, and may capture. Must stop upon capture.
○	Steps a limited number of squares along a straight line, capturing more than once.
●	Steps a limited number of squares within an area, changing direction and capturing more than once.
╋	Steps a fixed number of squares within an area, changing direction and capturing more than once; cannot stop until range is exhausted.
☆	Jumps a limited number of times to this square; square may also be reachable with an areal step.
!	igui (capture without moving). Counts for two steps.
│	Ranges along a straight line, crossing any number of empty squares. Must stop upon capture.
─	Ranges along a straight line, crossing any number of empty squares. Must stop upon capture.
╲	Ranges along a straight line, crossing any number of empty squares. Must stop upon capture.
╱	Ranges along a straight line, crossing any number of empty squares. Must stop upon capture.
─	Ranges in this direction as well as immobilizes enemy pieces in the way.
╲	Ranges in this direction as well as immobilizes enemy pieces in the way.
╱	Ranges in this direction as well as immobilizes enemy pieces in the way.
!	Shoots the nearest piece in this direction (capture without moving).
‼	Shoots twice in this direction (double capture without moving).
*	Shoots at one of these squares, by passing any intervening piece (capture without moving).
※	Burns all adjacent enemy and allied pieces wherever it stops.

==== Individual pieces ====
Pieces are arranged in this section so that, if they promote, the promoted version is to the right. Piece names with a grey background are present at the start of the game; those with a blue background only appear with promotion. Abbreviations of Kanji names are not official, but for the sake of Layout. Betza's funny notation has been included in parentheses for easy reference, with the extension that the notation xxxayyyK stands for an xxxK move possibly followed by an yyyK move, not necessarily in the same direction. Larger numbers of 'legs' can be indicated by repeated application of 'a', or by numbers: thus a3K means a piece that can take up to three steps of a king. By default continuation legs can go into all directions, but can be restricted to a single line by a modifier 'v' ("vertical", interpreted relative to the piece's current position on its path). Similarly, the modifier 'f' ("forward") would restrict it to a single line, and force it to always move away from its initial position. The default modality of all legs is the ability to move and capture: other possibilities are specified explicitly. Thus mKa3K means a piece that takes up to three steps of a king, but must stop when it first captures. Another extension is that inequalities can be used in place of numbers denoting range: thus, while R4 is a piece that moves like a rook, but only up to four squares, R(2≤n≤4) is a piece that moves like a rook, but only two, three, or four squares. R4! would be a rook that moves exactly four squares, and hence a3!K would be a piece that can take no more or no less than three steps of a king. Further, pn refers to cannon-like pieces that can jump at most n pieces along their path, and pp means the same as p∞ (just as WW is synonymous with W∞, both meaning a rook). Finally, x stands for "shooting": the xK for instance can pass its turn (shooting empty squares), or it can shoot (capture) any adjacent enemy piece without moving.

General 将 shō	The General does not promote.
○ / ○ / ○; ○ / 将 / ○; ○ / ○ / ○; Step: The general can step one intersection in any direction, orthogonal or diagonal. (K)
Middle troop 中軍 chūgun	Governor 帥 sui
○ / ○ / ○; ○ / 中 / ○; ○ / ○ / ○; Step: The middle troop can step one intersection in any direction, orthogonal or diagonal. (K)	○ / ○ / ○; ○ / 帥 / ○; ○ / ○ / ○; Step: The governor can step one intersection in any direction, orthogonal or diagonal. (K); Governor functions as a second general.
Drum 鼓 ko	Thunderclap 霹靂 hekireki
○ / / ○; ○ / 鼓 / ○; ○ / / ○; Step: The drum 鼓, like the banner 旗, can step one intersection in one of the four diagonal directions or either orthogonal sideways. That is, anywhere except directly forwards or backwards. (FrlW); If the drum 鼓 is killed, the pawns 歩兵 may no longer move forward (rlW).	/ / / / / ○; / / / / ┏ / ╋ / ┓; / / / ┏ / ╋ / ╋ / ╋ / ╋; / / ┏ / ╋ / ╋ / ╋ / ╋ / ╋ / ┓; / ┏ / ╋ / ╋ / ╋ / ╋ / ╋ / ╋ / ╋ / ┓; ○ / ╋ / ╋ / ╋ / ╋ / 霹 / ╋ / ╋ / ╋ / ╋ / ○; / ┗ / ╋ / ╋ / ╋ / ╋ / ╋ / ╋ / ╋ / ┛; / / ┗ / ╋ / ╋ / ╋ / ╋ / ╋ / ┛; / / / ┗ / ╋ / ╋ / ╋ / ┛; / / / / ┗ / ╋ / ┛; / / / / / ○; Quintuple move: The thunderclap steps five times per turn in an orthogonal direction, with the choice of changing directions after each step, potentially capturing up to five pieces.; Unlike other multiple-move pieces, the thunderclap must take all five steps. (a!5W) Therefore, the thunderclap must end up an odd number of steps from where it begins.; If the allied Taoist priest 高道 is killed, the thunderclap 霹靂 reverts to a drum 鼓.: / ● / / / / ●; ● / ╋ / ─ / ┳ / ─ / ╋ / ●; / │ / / │ / / │; / ┣ / ─ / 霹 / ─ / ┫; / │ / / │ / / │; ● / ╋ / ─ / ┻ / ─ / ╋ / ●; / ● / / / / ●; Kōshōgifu(廣象棋譜) and Kōshōgifugukai(広象棋譜愚解) give the following description of the thunderclap: the thunderclap takes five steps in three different orthogonal directions in total, making a turn after every two steps, potentially capturing up to five pieces.
Banner 旗 ki	Flag waver (or Roaming assault) 招揺 shōyō
○ / / ○; ○ / 旗 / ○; ○ / / ○; Step: The banner 旗, like the drum 鼓, can step one intersection in one of the four diagonal directions or either orthogonal sideways. That is, anywhere except directly forwards or backwards. (FrlW)	/ / / / / ○; / / / / / ○; / / / / / ○; / / / / / ○; / / / / / ○; ○ / ○ / ○ / ○ / ○ / 招 / ○ / ○ / ○ / ○ / ○; / / / / / ○; / / / / / ○; / / / / / ○; / / / / / ○; / / / / / ○; Limited-range quintuple move: The flag waver can step up to five times per turn in any one orthogonal direction, potentially capturing up to five pieces.; It cannot change direction while moving. (Wa5fW); If the allied Taoist priest 高道 is killed, the flag waver reverts to a banner 旗.
Sentry 護兵 gohei	Centuria 百総 hyakusō
○ / / ○; ○ / 護 / ○; ○ / ○ / ○; Step: The sentry can step one intersection in any direction except orthogonally forward. (FrlbW); This is the move of the blind tiger in other shogi variants.	╲ / / / / / / ╱; / ╲ / / / / ╱; / / ╲ / ○ / ╱; / / ○ / 百 / ○; / / ╱ / ○ / ╲; / ╱ / / / / ╲; ╱ / / / / / / ╲; Range: The centuria can move any number of free intersections along any of the four diagonal directions; or, Step: It can move one intersection in any orthogonal direction. (WB); This is the move of the dragon horse in other shogi variants.
Aide de camp 親兵 shimpei	Quartermaster 把総 wasō
○ / ○ / ○; ○ / 親 / ○; ○ / / ○; Step: The aide de camp can step one intersection in any direction, orthogonal or diagonal, except directly backward. (FfrlW); This is the move of the drunk elephant in other shogi variants. However, aide de camp does not promote to a prince.	/ / / │; / / / │; / / ○ / │ / ○; ─ / ─ / ─ / 把 / ─ / ─ / ─; / / ○ / │ / ○; / / / │; / / / │; Range: The quartermaster can move any number of free intersections along any of the four orthogonal directions; or, Step: It can move one intersection in any diagonal direction. (FR); This is the move of the dragon king in other shogi variants.
Aide 舎人 shajin	Town brigade 千戸 senko
○ / ○ / ○; ○ / 舎 / ○; / ○; Step: The aide can step one intersection in one of the four orthogonal directions; or, One intersection diagonally forward, giving it six possibilities. (WfF); This is the move of the gold general in other shogi variants.	/ │; / │; ○ / │ / ○; ○ / 千 / ○; ○ / │ / ○; / │; / │; Range: The town brigade can move any number of free intersections directly forward or backward.; Step: It can step one intersection in any direction. (fbRK); This is the move of the flying stag in chu shogi.
Staff 舎餘 shayo	Village brigade 百戸 hyakko
○ / ○ / ○; / 舎; ○ / / ○; Step: The staff can step one intersection in one of the four diagonal directions; or, One intersection straight forward, giving it five possibilities. (FfW); This is the move of the silver general in other shogi variants.	/ / ○ / ○ / ○; ─ / ─ / ─ / 百 / ─ / ─ / ─; / / ○ / ○ / ○; Range: The village brigade can move any number of free intersections directly to either side.; Step: It can step one intersection in any direction. (rlRK)
Chief of staff 軍吏 gunri	Vice commander 副司 fukushi
○ / ○ / ○; / 軍; ○ / ○ / ○; Step: The chief of staff can move one intersection in the four diagonal directions; or, It can move one intersection orthogonally forward or backward. (FfbW); This is the move of the ferocious leopard in other shogi variants.	╲ / / / │ / / / ╱; / ╲ / / │ / / ╱; / / ╲ / │ / ╱; / / / 副; / / ╱ / / ╲; / ╱ / / / / ╲; ╱ / / / / / / ╲; Range: The vice commander can move any number of free intersections along one of the four diagonal directions, or directly forward. (BfR); This is the move of the free silver in other shogi variants.
Engineer 軍匠 gunshō	Poison flame 毒火 dokka
○ / ○ / ○; / 軍; / ○; Step: The engineer can step one intersection directly forward or backward, or one intersection diagonally forward, giving it four possibilities. (fKbW); This is the move of the copper general in other shogi variants.	※ / ※ / ※; ※ / 毒 / ※; ※ / ※ / ※; Step: When the engineer 軍匠 promotes to poison flame 毒火, the engineer does not change how it moves; poison flame 毒火 remains a step mover. However, Burn: Wherever poison flame 毒火 lands, all adjacent enemy and allied pieces (Note: Kōshōgifu states "Everything adjacent to it is killed, no matter whether it's a foe or friend, even if they are the Taoist priest and spiritual monk." (其所近，不分他我，雖高道神僧皆死) The original text points out that Taoist priest and spiritual monk will be burned by the flame before they were able to shoot it while Kōshōgifugukai does not mention this part.) are 'burned' and removed from the board. (fKbW + immediate xK); It is not clear what happens when two opposing poison flames meet. Nor what happens if any other opposing piece lands next to a poison flame. See the fire demon 火鬼 in tenjiku shogi for some possibilities.
Sumo wrestler 力士 rikishi	The Sumo wrestler does not promote
○ / ● / ● / ● / ○; ● / ! / ! / ! / ●; ● / ! / 力 / ! / ●; ● / ! / ! / ! / ●; ○ / ● / ● / ● / ○; Area move with double capture: The sumo wrestler can move in one turn as a general does in two.; That is, it steps one intersection in any direction once or twice, potentially capturing two pieces per turn. By changing directions after its first step, it can reach the intersections that a knight jumps to in Western chess.; By moving back to its starting intersection, it can effectively capture a piece on an adjacent intersection without moving. This is called 居喰い igui "stationary feeding".; A similar move without capturing leaves the board unchanged, which is a way to pass a turn. (aK); Sumo wrestler cannot jump over an intervening friendly piece as a lion 獅子 can in other shogi variants.	
Clerk 記室 kishitsu	Master at arms 軍師 gunshi
/ / ☆; / ○ / / ○; ☆ / / 記 / / ☆; / ○ / / ○; / / ☆; Step: The clerk can step one intersection in one of the four diagonal directions.; Jump: It can jump to the second intersection orthogonally. (FD); This is the move of the kirin in other shogi variants.	/ / / / ☆; / / / ☆ / / ☆; / / ☆ / / ! / / ☆; / ☆ / / ! / / ! / / ☆; ☆ / / ! / / 軍 / / ! / / ☆; / ☆ / / ! / / ! / / ☆; / / ☆ / / ! / / ☆; / / / ☆ / / ☆; / / / / ☆; Double move: Upon promotion, the clerk gains the power to move twice per turn. (a[FD]); This is like a double kirin move in chu shogi and other shogi variants.
Staff officer 参謀 sambō	Banner-and-drum 旗鼓 kiko
☆ / / / / ☆; / / ○; / ○ / 参 / ○; / / ○; ☆ / / / / ☆; Step: The staff officer can step one intersection in one of the four orthogonal directions.; Jump: It can jump to the second intersection diagonally. (WA); This is the move of the phoenix in other shogi variants.	☆ / / / / ☆ / / / / ☆; / / ☆ / / / / ☆; / ☆ / ! / ☆ / ● / ☆ / ! / ☆; / / ☆ / ● / ! / ● / ☆; ☆ / / ● / ! / 旗 / ! / ● / / ☆; / / ☆ / ● / ! / ● / ☆; / ☆ / ! / ☆ / ● / ☆ / ! / ☆; / / ☆ / / / / ☆; ☆ / / / / ☆ / / / / ☆; Double move: Upon promotion, the staff officer gains the power to move twice per turn. (a[WA]) (Note: Kōshōgifu mentions that the banner-and-drum can take over the role of the banner and the drum (可以代旗與鼓), but doesn't give more explanation, while Kōshōgifugukai just omits this rule.); This is like a double phoenix move in other shogi variants.
Taoist priest 高道 kōdō and Spiritual monk 神僧 shinzō	Five-li fog 五里霧 gorimu and Immaculate light 聖燈 shōtō
□ / □ / □; □ / 高 / □; □ / □ / □; then: ! / ! / !; ! / 高 / !; ! / ! / !; Jump: The Taoist priest 高道 and spiritual monk 神僧 can jump to the second intersection in any direction, orthogonal or diagonal. They can only capture an enemy Taoist priest 高道, Spiritual monk 神僧, Five-li fog 五里霧, or Immaculate light 聖燈 with such a jump (one of their own kind).; Shot: They can shoot any one enemy piece on any intersection adjacent to their arrival point. ([DA]acxK).; There is no limitation on what they can capture with their shot (except that they will never land next to one of their own kind). These two pieces move and promote the same, but only the loss of the priest 高道 reverts and prevents promotion of the banner 旗 and drum 鼓.	□ / □ / □ / □ / □; □ / □ / □ / □ / □; □ / □ / 五 / □ / □; □ / □ / □ / □ / □; □ / □ / □ / □ / □; after each jump: ! / ! / !; ! / 五 / !; ! / ! / !; Double move: When they promote, the priest 高道 and monk 神僧 gain the power to move twice per turn, including the option of shooting one adjacent piece after each move; they continue to be restricted from capturing by displacement (except for one of their own kind). (a[DA]acxK); There continues to be no limitation on what they can capture with their two shots (except that they will continue never to land next to one of their own kind).: Except for the Taoist priest, spiritual monk, five-li fog or immaculate light, any shooting pieces are disabled from shooting if they are within five intersections of an enemy five-li fog. Not only are they ineffective in shooting the five-li fog but also at other pieces in other directions. (Note: Kōshōgifu states "it can cause all bows, crossbows, cannons, Frankish cannon within five intersections to lose their skills." (能使五路之間弓、弩、砲、佛狼機皆失其技) Note that "within five intersections" 五路之間 may suggest any positions that can be reached by taking five king steps, so it may be an area rather than a queen's direction.) However, the Frankish cannon or chariot of the gods can still shoot it from a distance of six or seven intersections away.; If a five-li fog 五里霧 and immaculate light 聖燈 ever find themselves within five intersections of each other, the fog 五里霧 immediately reverts to a Taoist priest 高道. (Note: Kōshōgifu states "it can disable five-li fog within five intersections, by demoting it". (五路之間能制五里霧，使還舊) Again, "within five intersections" 五路之間 may be an area.)
Advance guard 前衝 zenshō	Skyward net (or 'Heaven's vengeance') 天網 temmō
│; │; │; 前; ○; Range: The advance guard can move any number of free intersections directly forward.; Step: It can step one intersection directly backwards. (fRbW); This piece promotes if its clerk promotes.	╲ / / / / / / ╱; / ╲ / / / / ╱; / / ╲ / / ╱; ─ / ─ / ─ / 天 / ─ / ─ / ─; / / / ○; Range: The skyward net can move any number of free intersections along either of the forward diagonals, or directly to either side.; Step: It can step one intersection directly backward. (rlRfBbW); Immobilize: The skyward net immobilizes all enemy pieces in its ranging directions. (Note: Kōshōgifu states "it can trap pieces in those directions it aims in, making them immobile". (其所指能罣子，使不動))
Rear guard 後衝 goshō	Earthward net (or 'Earth's vengeance') 地網 chimō
○; 後; │; │; │; Range: The rear guard can move any number of free intersections directly backward; or, Step: It can step one intersection directly forwards. (fWbR); This piece promotes if its clerk promotes.	/ / / ○; ─ / ─ / ─ / 地 / ─ / ─ / ─; / / ╱ / / ╲; / ╱ / / / / ╲; ╱ / / / / / / ╲; Range: The earthward net can move any number of free intersections along either of the rear diagonals, or directly to either side; or, Step: It can step one intersection directly forward. (rlRbBfW); Immobilize: The earthward net immobilizes all enemy pieces in its ranging directions.
Millenary 千総 sensō	Dragon ascending 龍驤 ryūjō
╲ / / / │ / / / ╱; / ╲ / / │ / / ╱; / / ╲ / │ / ╱; ─ / ─ / ─ / 千 / ─ / ─ / ─; / / ╱ / │ / ╲; / ╱ / / │ / / ╲; ╱ / / / │ / / / ╲; Range: The millenary can move any number of free intersections along any one of the eight orthogonal or diagonal directions. (Q); This is the move of the queen in other shogi variants.	╲ / / / │ / / / ╱; / ╲ / / │ / / ╱; / / ╲ / │ / ╱; ─ / ─ / ─ / 龍 / ─ / ─ / ─; / / ╱ / │ / ╲; / ╱ / / │ / / ╲; ╱ / / / │ / / / ╲; or: ○ / ● / ● / ● / ○; ● / ! / ! / ! / ●; ● / ! / 龍 / ! / ●; ● / ! / ! / ! / ●; ○ / ● / ● / ● / ○; The dragon arising adds the moves of the sumo wrestler 力士 to those of the millenary.: Range: It can move any number of free intersections along any of the eight directions.; Double move: As the sumo wrestler, above. (Q[aK])
Quartermaster 把総 hasō	Tiger wing 虎翼 koyoku
/ / / │; / / / │; / / ○ / │ / ○; ─ / ─ / ─ / 把 / ─ / ─ / ─; / / ○ / │ / ○; / / / │; / / / │; Range: The quartermaster can move any number of free intersections along any of the four orthogonal directions; or, Step: It can move one intersection in any diagonal direction. (FR); This is the move of the dragon king in other shogi variants.	/ / / │; / ○ / / ● / / ○; / / ! / │ / !; ─ / ● / ─ / 虎 / ─ / ● / ─; / / ! / │ / !; / ○ / / ● / / ○; / / / │; Double move: The tiger wing moves like a shield (one step diagonally) once or twice per turn. Or.; Range: It can move any number of free intersections along any of the four orthogonal directions. (R[aF])
Centuria 百総 hyakusō	War hawk 鷹揚 yōyō
╲ / / / / / / ╱; / ╲ / / / / ╱; / / ╲ / ○ / ╱; / / ○ / 百 / ○; / / ╱ / ○ / ╲; / ╱ / / / / ╲; ╱ / / / / / / ╲; Range: The centuria can move any number of free intersections along any of the four diagonal directions; or, Step: It can move one intersection in any orthogonal direction. (WB); This is the move of the dragon horse in other shogi variants.	╲ / / / / / / ╱; / ╲ / / ○ / / ╱; / / ● / ! / ●; / ○ / ! / 鷹 / ! / ○; / / ● / ! / ●; / ╱ / / ○ / / ╲; ╱ / / / / / / ╲; Double move: The war hawk can step one or two intersections in any orthogonal direction, potentially capturing a piece with each step. Or, Range: It can move any number of free intersections along any of the four diagonal directions. (B[aW])
Elephant 象 zō	The Elephant does not promote
╲ / / / / / / ╱; / ╲ / / / / ╱; / / ╲ / / ╱; / / / 象; / / ╱ / / ╲; / ╱ / / / / ╲; ╱ / / / / / / ╲; Range: The elephant can move any number of free intersections along any of the four diagonal directions. (B); This is the move of the bishop in other shogi variants.	
Longbow 弓 kyū	Longbow cavalryman 彍騎 kōki
○ / / ○; / 弓; ○ / / ○; then: ! / / / ! / / / !; / ! / / ! / / !; / / ! / ! / !; ! / ! / ! / 弓 / ! / ! / !; / / ! / ! / !; / ! / / ! / / !; ! / / / ! / / / !; Step: The longbow can move one intersection in one of the four diagonal directions.; Shot: Longbow can shoot one enemy piece up to three free intersections from its landing point, in any of the eight prime directions. (Fa[cxQ3], ignoring restrictions on what it can capture); Longbow cannot shoot a shield 牌, shield unit 牌総, chariot 車, chariot unit 車総, heavenly fortress 天塁, or five-li fog 五里霧.	/ ☆ / / ☆; ☆ / / / / ☆; / / 彍; ☆ / / / / ☆; / ☆ / / ☆; then: ! / / / ! / / / !; / ! / / ! / / !; / / ! / ! / !; ! / ! / ! / 彍 / ! / ! / !; / / ! / ! / !; / ! / / ! / / !; ! / / / ! / / / !; The longbow cavalryman combines the move of the cavalryman with the attack of the longbow.: Jump: Longbow cavalryman can jump as a cavalryman to any of its eight destinations.; Shot: Longbow cavalryman can shoot one enemy piece up to three free intersections away from its landing point in any prime direction. (Na[cxQ3]); The limitation on what longbow cavalryman can shoot is the same as before promotion.
Crossbow 弩 do	Crossbow cavalryman 弩騎 doki
○ / / ○; / 弩; ○ / / ○; then: ! / / / / / ! / / / / / !; / ! / / / / ! / / / / !; / / ! / / / ! / / / !; / / / ! / / ! / / !; / / / / ! / ! / !; ! / ! / ! / ! / ! / 弩 / ! / ! / ! / ! / !; / / / / ! / ! / !; / / / ! / / ! / / !; / / ! / / / ! / / / !; / ! / / / / ! / / / / !; ! / / / / / ! / / / / / !; Crossbow is identical to longbow, except that it can shoot up to five free intersections away. (Fa[cxQ5], ignoring restrictions on what it can capture); Crossbow cannot shoot a shield 牌, shield unit 牌総, chariot 車, chariot unit 車総, heavenly fortress 天塁, or five-li fog 五里霧.	/ ☆ / / ☆; ☆ / / / / ☆; / / 弩; ☆ / / / / ☆; / ☆ / / ☆; then: ! / / / / / ! / / / / / !; / ! / / / / ! / / / / !; / / ! / / / ! / / / !; / / / ! / / ! / / !; / / / / ! / ! / !; ! / ! / ! / ! / ! / 弩 / ! / ! / ! / ! / !; / / / / ! / ! / !; / / / ! / / ! / / !; / / ! / / / ! / / / !; / ! / / / / ! / / / / !; ! / / / / / ! / / / / / !; The crossbow cavalryman combines the move of the cavalryman with the attack of the crossbow.: Jump: Crossbow cavalryman can jump as a cavalryman to any of its eight destinations.; Shot: Crossbow cavalryman can shoot one enemy piece up to five free intersections away from its landing point in any prime direction. (Na[cxQ5]); The limitation on what crossbow cavalryman can shoot is the same as before promotion.
Cannon 砲 hō	Gun carriage 砲車 hōsha
○ / / ○; / 砲; ○ / / ○; then: ＊ / / / / / ＊ / / / / / ＊; / ＊ / / / / ＊ / / / / ＊; / / ＊ / / / ＊ / / / ＊; / / / ＊ / / ＊ / / ＊; / / / / ＊ / ＊ / ＊; ＊ / ＊ / ＊ / ＊ / ＊ / 砲 / ＊ / ＊ / ＊ / ＊ / ＊; / / / / ＊ / ＊ / ＊; / / / ＊ / / ＊ / / ＊; / / ＊ / / / ＊ / / / ＊; / ＊ / / / / ＊ / / / / ＊; ＊ / / / / / ＊ / / / / / ＊; Step: The cannon can move one intersection in one of the four diagonal directions.; Shot: Cannon can shoot one enemy piece up to five free or occupied intersections away from its landing point in any of the eight prime directions. Cannon can shoot over any intervening pieces of either army but may not shoot over any shield unit 牌総 or heavenly fortress 天塁 no matter which army they belong to. (Fa[cx[Q5ppQ5]], ignoring restrictions on what it may shoot over and what it can capture); Cannon cannot shoot a shield unit 牌総, heavenly fortress 天塁, or five-li fog 五里霧.	/ / / / / ○; / / / / / ○; / / / / / ○; / / / / / ○; / / / / / ○; ○ / ○ / ○ / ○ / ○ / 砲 / ○ / ○ / ○ / ○ / ○; / / / / / ○; / / / / / ○; / / / / / ○; / / / / / ○; / / / / / ○; then: ＊ / / / / / ＊ / / / / / ＊; / ＊ / / / / ＊ / / / / ＊; / / ＊ / / / ＊ / / / ＊; / / / ＊ / / ＊ / / ＊; / / / / ＊ / ＊ / ＊; ＊ / ＊ / ＊ / ＊ / ＊ / 砲 / ＊ / ＊ / ＊ / ＊ / ＊; / / / / ＊ / ＊ / ＊; / / / ＊ / / ＊ / / ＊; / / ＊ / / / ＊ / / / ＊; / ＊ / / / / ＊ / / / / ＊; ＊ / / / / / ＊ / / / / / ＊; Limited range: The gun carriage can move up to five free intersections along one of the four orthogonal directions.; Shot: Gun carriage can shoot as a cannon: One enemy piece up to five intersections away from its arrival point in any of the eight prime directions.; Like a cannon, it can shoot over intervening pieces but may not shoot over any shield unit 牌総 or heavenly fortress 天塁 no matter which army they belong to. ([R5]a[cx[Q5ppQ5]], ignoring restrictions on what it may shoot over and what it can capture); The limitation on what gun carriage can shoot is the same as before promotion. Moreover, it cannot capture a heavenly fortress by displacement. Gun carriage cannot be shot by the longbow, longbow cavalryman, crossbow, or crossbow cavalryman. (Note: The gun carriage and chariot of the gods are only clearly mentioned in Kōshōgifugukai. Kōshōgifu doesn't directly mention this rule, but seems to suggest it in the context.)
Frankish cannon (or European cannon) 佛狼機 butsurōki	Chariot of the gods 神機車 shinkisha
○ / / ○; / 佛; ○ / / ○; then: ‼ / / / / / / / ‼ / / / / / / / ‼; / ‼ / / / / / / ‼ / / / / / / ‼; / / ‼ / / / / / ‼ / / / / / ‼; / / / ‼ / / / / ‼ / / / / ‼; / / / / ‼ / / / ‼ / / / ‼; / / / / / ‼ / / ‼ / / ‼; / / / / / / ‼ / ‼ / ‼; ‼ / ‼ / ‼ / ‼ / ‼ / ‼ / ‼ / 佛 / ‼ / ‼ / ‼ / ‼ / ‼ / ‼ / ‼; / / / / / / ‼ / ‼ / ‼; / / / / / ‼ / / ‼ / / ‼; / / / / ‼ / / / ‼ / / / ‼; / / / ‼ / / / / ‼ / / / / ‼; / / ‼ / / / / / ‼ / / / / / ‼; / ‼ / / / / / / ‼ / / / / / / ‼; ‼ / / / / / / / ‼ / / / / / / / ‼; Step: The Frankish cannon can move one intersection in one of the four diagonal directions.; Double shot: Frankish cannon can shoot two enemy pieces up to 7 free intersections from its landing point in any of the eight prime directions.; Frankish cannon may shoot in different directions, or it may shoot one piece, and then shoot a second piece that had been blocked by the first. (Fa[a[cxQ7]], ignoring restrictions on what it can capture); Frankish cannon cannot shoot a shield unit 牌総 or heavenly fortress 天塁. It can only shoot at a five-li fog 五里霧 that is at least six intersections away.	/ / / / / ○; / / / / / ○; / / / / / ○; / / / / / ○; / / / / / ○; ○ / ○ / ○ / ○ / ○ / 神 / ○ / ○ / ○ / ○ / ○; / / / / / ○; / / / / / ○; / / / / / ○; / / / / / ○; / / / / / ○; then: ‼ / / / / / / / ‼ / / / / / / / ‼; / ‼ / / / / / / ‼ / / / / / / ‼; / / ‼ / / / / / ‼ / / / / / ‼; / / / ‼ / / / / ‼ / / / / ‼; / / / / ‼ / / / ‼ / / / ‼; / / / / / ‼ / / ‼ / / ‼; / / / / / / ‼ / ‼ / ‼; ‼ / ‼ / ‼ / ‼ / ‼ / ‼ / ‼ / 神 / ‼ / ‼ / ‼ / ‼ / ‼ / ‼ / ‼; / / / / / / ‼ / ‼ / ‼; / / / / / ‼ / / ‼ / / ‼; / / / / ‼ / / / ‼ / / / ‼; / / / ‼ / / / / ‼ / / / / ‼; / / ‼ / / / / / ‼ / / / / / ‼; / ‼ / / / / / / ‼ / / / / / / ‼; ‼ / / / / / / / ‼ / / / / / / / ‼; Limited range: The chariot of the gods can move up to five free intersections along one of the four orthogonal directions.; Double shot: Chariot of the gods retains the attack of the Frankish cannon: two pieces up to seven intersections away. ([R5]a[a[cxQ7]]), ignoring restrictions on what it can capture); The limitation on what chariot of the gods can shoot is the same as before promotion. Moreover, it cannot capture a heavenly fortress by displacement. Chariot of the gods cannot be shot by the longbow, longbow cavalryman, crossbow, or crossbow cavalryman.
Cavalryman 馬兵 bahei	Cavalry 騎総 kisō
/ ☆ / / ☆; ☆ / / / / ☆; / / 馬; ☆ / / / / ☆; / ☆ / / ☆; Jump: The cavalryman jumps at an angle intermediate between orthogonal and diagonal, amounting to one intersection orthogonally plus one intersection diagonally, in a single motion, ignoring any intervening piece. That is, it has a choice of eight destinations. (N); This is the move of the knight in Western chess. Cavalryman promotes if it captures a Frankish cannon.	/ ☆ / / ☆ / / ☆; ☆ / / ! / / ! / / ☆; / ! / / / / !; ☆ / / / 騎 / / / ☆; / ! / / / / !; ☆ / / ! / / ! / / ☆; / ☆ / / ☆ / / ☆; Double jump with double capture: The cavalry jumps once or twice as a cavalryman in a single turn, potentially capturing two pieces.; If it jumps twice, both jumps must be in the same orthogonal direction (both forwards, backwards, to the left, or to the right). That is, after the cavalry makes its first jump, it is restricted to only two landing squares for its second jump, similar to the restriction of a knight in other shogi variants. Or, For its second jump, it may return to its starting point. This gives the cavalry a power of igui and passing a turn similar to that of the sumo wrestler. ([NaffN][xN])
Cavalry 騎総 kisō	Winged horse 天馬 temba
/ ☆ / / ☆ / / ☆; ☆ / / ! / / ! / / ☆; / ! / / / / !; ☆ / / / 騎 / / / ☆; / ! / / / / !; ☆ / / ! / / ! / / ☆; / ☆ / / ☆ / / ☆; Double jump with double capture: The cavalry jumps once or twice as a cavalryman in a single turn, potentially capturing two pieces.; If it jumps twice, both jumps must be in the same orthogonal direction (both forwards, backwards, to the left, or to the right). That is, after the cavalry makes its first jump, it is restricted to only two landing squares for its second jump, similar to the restriction of a knight in other shogi variants. Or, For its second jump, it may return to its starting point. This gives the cavalry a power of igui and passing a turn similar to that of the sumo wrestler. ([NaffN][xN])	/ / ☆ / / ☆ / / ☆; / ☆ / / ☆ / / ☆ / / ☆; ☆ / / / ! / ☆ / ! / / / ☆; / ☆ / ! / ☆ / / ☆ / ! / ☆; ☆ / / ☆ / / 天 / / ☆ / / ☆; / ☆ / ! / ☆ / / ☆ / ! / ☆; ☆ / / / ! / ☆ / ! / / / ☆; / ☆ / / ☆ / / ☆ / / ☆; / / ☆ / / ☆ / / ☆; Double move: The winged horse moves as a cavalry, but without any restriction on the direction of the second jump. That is, it moves twice like a knight in Western chess. (aN)
Pawn 歩兵 fuhyō	Patrol unit 歩総 fusō
/ ○; ○ / 歩 / ○; / ○; Step: The pawn can step one intersection in one of the four orthogonal directions. (W); This is the move of the angry boar in other shogi variants. If the drum 鼓 is captured, the pawns 歩兵 can no longer move in the forward direction. (rlbW)	/ │; / │; / │; ○ / 歩 / ○; / │; / │; / │; Range: The patrol unit can move any number of free intersections orthogonally forward or backward; or, Step: It can step one intersection orthogonally sideways. (fbRW); This is the move of the vertical mover in other shogi variants.
Patrol unit 歩総 fusō	Commissar 都司 toshi
/ │; / │; / │; ○ / 歩 / ○; / │; / │; / │; Range: The patrol unit can move any number of free intersections orthogonally forward or backward; or, Step: It can step one intersection orthogonally sideways. (fbRW); This is the move of the vertical mover in other shogi variants.	╲ / / / │ / / / ╱; / ╲ / / │ / / ╱; / / ╲ / │ / ╱; / / / 都; / / ╱ / │ / ╲; / ╱ / / │ / / ╲; ╱ / / / │ / / / ╲; Range: The commissar can move any number of free intersections along one of the four diagonals; or, It can move any number of free intersections orthogonally forward or backward. (BfbR); This is the move of the flying ox in chu shogi.
Shield 牌 hai	Shield unit 牌総 haisō
○ / / ○; / 牌; ○ / / ○; Step: The shield can step one intersection in one of the four diagonal directions. (F); Shield cannot be shot by the longbow, longbow cavalryman, crossbow, or crossbow cavalryman. This is the move of the cat sword in dai shogi.	/ / ○ / / ○; ─ / ─ / ─ / 牌 / ─ / ─ / ─; / / ○ / / ○; Range: The shield unit can move any number of free intersections orthogonally to either side.; Step: It can step one intersection in one of the four diagonal directions. (rlRF); Shield unit cannot be shot by the longbow, longbow cavalryman, crossbow, crossbow cavalryman, cannon, gun carriage, Frankish cannon or chariot of the gods.
Shield unit 牌総 haisō	Heavenly fortress(or Imperial base) 天塁 tenrui
/ / ○ / / ○; ─ / ─ / ─ / 牌 / ─ / ─ / ─; / / ○ / / ○; Range: The shield unit can move any number of free intersections orthogonally to either side.; Step: It can step one intersection in one of the four diagonal directions. (rlRF); Shield unit cannot be shot by the longbow, longbow cavalryman, crossbow, crossbow cavalryman, cannon, gun carriage, Frankish cannon or chariot of the gods.	╲ / / / / / / ╱; / ╲ / / / / ╱; / / ╲ / / ╱; ─ / ─ / ─ / 天 / ─ / ─ / ─; / / ╱ / / ╲; / ╱ / / / / ╲; ╱ / / / / / / ╲; Range: The heavenly fortress can move any number of free intersections in the four diagonal directions, or directly to either side. (fbRB, ignoring restrictions on what can capture it); This is the move of the free boar in chu shogi. Heavenly fortress cannot be shot by the longbow, longbow cavalryman, crossbow, crossbow cavalryman, cannon, gun carriage, Frankish cannon or chariot of the gods, nor can it be captured by displacement by the chariot, chariot unit, gun carriage or chariot of the gods.
Chariot 車 sha	Chariot unit 車総 shasō
/ / / / / ○; / / / / / ○; / / / / / ○; / / / / / ○; / / / / / ○; ○ / ○ / ○ / ○ / ○ / 車 / ○ / ○ / ○ / ○ / ○; / / / / / ○; / / / / / ○; / / / / / ○; / / / / / ○; / / / / / ○; Limited range: The chariot can move one to five free intersections in one of the four orthogonal directions. (R5, ignoring restrictions on what it can capture and what can capture it); It cannot capture the heavenly fortress 天塁. Chariot cannot be shot by the longbow, longbow cavalryman, crossbow, or crossbow cavalryman.	/ / / │; / / / │; / / / │; ─ / ─ / ─ / 車 / ─ / ─ / ─; / / / │; / / / │; / / / │; Range: The chariot unit can move any number of free intersections along any of the four orthogonal directions. (R); This is the move of the rook in other chess variants. It cannot capture the heavenly fortress 天塁. Chariot unit cannot be shot by the longbow, longbow cavalryman, crossbow, or crossbow cavalryman.
Chariot unit 車総 shasō	Millenary 千総 sensō
/ / / │; / / / │; / / / │; ─ / ─ / ─ / 車 / ─ / ─ / ─; / / / │; / / / │; / / / │; Range: The chariot unit can move any number of free intersections along any of the four orthogonal directions. (R); This is the move of the rook in other shogi variants. It cannot capture the heavenly fortress 天塁. Chariot unit cannot be shot by the longbow, longbow cavalryman, crossbow, or crossbow cavalryman.	╲ / / / │ / / / ╱; / ╲ / / │ / / ╱; / / ╲ / │ / ╱; ─ / ─ / ─ / 千 / ─ / ─ / ─; / / ╱ / │ / ╲; / ╱ / / │ / / ╲; ╱ / / / │ / / / ╲; Range: The millenary can move any number of free intersections along any one of the eight orthogonal or diagonal directions. (Q); This is the move of the queen in other shogi variants..
Vanguard 先鋒 sempō	Commissar 都司 toshi
○; ○; ○; ○; ○; 先; Limited range: The vanguard can move one to five free intersections directly forward. (fR5)	╲ / / / │ / / / ╱; / ╲ / / │ / / ╱; / / ╲ / │ / ╱; / / / 都; / / ╱ / │ / ╲; / ╱ / / │ / / ╲; ╱ / / / │ / / / ╲; Range: The commissar can move any number of free intersections along one of the four diagonals; or, It can move any number of free intersections orthogonally forward or backward. (fbRB); This is the move of the flying ox in chu shogi.

==== Limitation of Ability ====
Capture by displacement

- The chariot, chariot unit, gun carriage and chariot of the gods cannot capture a heavenly fortress.
- The Taoist priest, five-li fog, spiritual monk, and immaculate light cannot capture any pieces except for one of their own kind. However, other shooting pieces can capture by displacement. (Note: Although some modern sources claim that all pieces with shooting power cannot capture by displacement, the original source doesn't mention all of them are restricted as well, and since it mentions gun carriage and chariot of the gods cannot capture a heavenly fortress by displacement, it seems obviously logical that they can capture other pieces by displacement.)

Capture by shot

shooter\target	other pieces	shield chariot chariot unit (gun carriage) (chariot of the gods)	shield unit heavenly fortress	five-li fog
longbow longbow cavalryman crossbow crossbow cavalryman	○	×	×	×
cannon gun carriage Frankish cannon chariot of the gods	○	○	×	cannot within five intersections^{1.}
Taoist priest five-li fog spiritual monk immaculate light	○	○	○	impossible^{2.}

1. The Frankish cannon and chariot of the gods can only shoot a five-li fog from a distance of six or seven intersections away.
2. Because of their colorbound movement, the Taoist priest, five-li fog, spiritual monk, and immaculate light can never reach a position where they can shoot one another.

=== Promotion ===
Ko shogi has the most complex promotion rules of any shogi variant.

A player's promotion zone is the enemy camp, consisting of the six farthest ranks that comprise the opponent's territory at setup (the original line of the opponent's chariots and beyond). If a piece moves within this promotion zone, including moves into, out of, or wholly within the zone, then that player may promote the piece at the end of the turn. (The general, sumo wrestler, and elephant do not promote, nor do pieces which have already promoted.) Promotion has the effect of changing how a piece moves. See the table above for what each piece promotes to. Promotion is effected by turning the piece over, revealing the name of its promoted rank.

However, there are other ways of promoting than entering the enemy camp:

- A piece that captures the general 将, governor 帥, (Note: The governor 帥 is not mentioned in Kōshōgifu and Kōshōgifugukai.) middle troop 中軍, banner 旗 or drum 鼓 promotes on the spot.
- A step mover (that is, a piece which can only move one step at a time) which captures a sumo wrestler 力士, dragon ascending 龍驤, flag waver 招揺, or thunderclap 霹靂, promotes on the spot.
- The cavalryman 馬兵 promotes if it captures a Frankish cannon 佛狼機.
- When the clerk 記室 promotes to master at arms 軍師, all the allied advance and rear guards 前衝, 後衝 promote as well, while any enemy poison flame 毒火 dies.

There are other circumstances that may prevent or revert promotion:

- If the Taoist priest 高道 is captured, the drum 鼓 and banner 旗 can no longer promote, and if either or both have already promoted (to flag waver 招揺 or thunderclap 霹靂), then they immediately revert to drum or banner.
- Whenever the immaculate light 聖燈 is within 5 intersections of the five-li fog 五里霧, the fog reverts to a Taoist priest 高道.

Many pieces only appear as a result of promotion. They are marked with a blue background in the movement diagrams above.

=== Check and mate ===
Unlike Western chess, a player need not move out of check, and indeed may even move into check. Although obviously not often a good idea, a player with more than one commanding piece (general or governor) may occasionally sacrifice one of these pieces as part of a gambit.

A player is not allowed to give perpetual check to the sole objective piece.

=== Game end ===
A player who captures the opponent's general 将 and either the middle troop 中軍 or the banner 旗 wins the game. However, if the opponent's middle troop has promoted to governor 帥, and the player captures the general and banner, then the governor takes command in place of the general and the game continues until it too is captured. That is, a player can continue the game with either the general, or the governor, or with both the middle troop and the banner together.

In practice the final capture rarely happens, as a player will resign when checkmated, as otherwise when loss is inevitable.

A player who makes an illegal move loses immediately. (This rule may be relaxed in casual games.)

Another possible, if rather uncommon, way for a game to end is repetition (sennichite). If the same position occurs four times with the same player to play, then the game is no contest. Recall, however, the prohibition against perpetual check.

== Game notation ==
The method used in English-language texts to express shogi moves was established by George Hodges in 1976. It is derived from the algebraic notation used for chess, but differs in several respects. Modifications have been made for kō shogi.

A typical example is P-8h. The first letter represents the piece moved (see above). Promoted pieces have a + added in front of the letter. (e.g., +MA for a governor (promoted middle troop). The designation of the piece is followed by a symbol indicating the type of move: - for an ordinary move or x for a capture. Next is the designation for the intersection on which the piece lands. This consists of a number representing the file and a lowercase letter representing the rank, with 1a being the top right corner (as seen from Black's point of view) and 19s being the bottom left corner. (This method of designating intersections is based on Japanese convention, which, however, uses Japanese numerals instead of letters. For example, the intersection 2c is denoted by 2三 in Japanese.)

If a piece captures by 'igui' (possibilities are the sumo wrestler, dragon ascending, tiger wing, cavalry, winged horse, five-li fog, immaculate light, banner and drums, or master at arms), the intersection of the piece being captured is used instead of the destination intersection, and it is preceded by the symbol '!'. If a second or later capture is made, then it is added after the preceding capture.

If a move entitles the player to promote the piece, then a + is added to the end to signify that the promotion was taken, or an = to indicate that it was declined. For example, MAx7c= indicates a middle troop capturing on 7c without promoting.

In cases where the above notation would be ambiguous as to which piece is meant, the designation of the starting intersection is added after the designation for the piece.

Moves are commonly numbered as in chess.

== See also ==
- Shogi variant
