= Giraffe (chess) =

Fairy chess piece

White giraffe

Black giraffe

Typical icons for the giraffe used in diagrams

The giraffe is a fairy chess piece with an elongated knight move. It can jump four squares vertically and one square horizontally or four squares horizontally and one square vertically, regardless of intervening pieces; thus, it is a (1,4)-leaper.

== Movement and value ==
	a	b	c	d	e	f	g	h	i	j
10	a10	b10	c10	d10 black circle	e10	f10 black circle	g10	h10	i10	j10	10
9	a9	b9	c9	d9	e9	f9	g9	h9	i9	j9	9
8	a8	b8	c8	d8	e8	f8	g8	h8	i8	j8	8
7	a7 black circle	b7	c7	d7	e7	f7	g7	h7	i7 black circle	j7	7
6	a6	b6	c6	d6	e6 white giraffe	f6	g6	h6	i6	j6	6
5	a5 black circle	b5	c5	d5	e5	f5	g5	h5	i5 black circle	j5	5
4	a4	b4	c4	d4	e4	f4	g4	h4	i4	j4	4
3	a3	b3	c3	d3	e3	f3	g3	h3	i3	j3	3
2	a2	b2	c2	d2 black circle	e2	f2 black circle	g2	h2	i2	j2	2
1	a1	b1	c1	d1	e1	f1	g1	h1	i1	j1	1
	a	b	c	d	e	f	g	h	i	j

Possible moves of the giraffe

Despite its long range the giraffe’s estimated value is likely 2 (appreciably less than the knight) since its movement pattern is clunkier, especially on an 8×8 board.

Some versions of the giraffe move beyond the 1 plus 4 orthogonal movement, basically becoming a one-directional rook after its original movement. Others just move like the zebra piece in a 2 plus 3 orthogonal pattern as that is the case in Grant Acedrex and some other chess variants.

== History ==
The giraffe is employed in some variations of Great chess. According to H. J. R. Murray, the giraffe appears as a (1,4)-leaper in Grant Acedrex; however, other sources describe a (2,3) movement pattern, similar to the zebra.

== See also ==
- Camel (chess)
- Zebra (chess)
