= Camel (chess) =

Fairy chess piece

White camel

Black camel

Common icons used in diagrams

The camel or long knight is a fairy chess piece with an elongated knight move. It can jump three squares horizontally and one square vertically or three squares vertically and one square horizontally, regardless of intervening pieces. Therefore, it is a (1,3)-leaper. The piece is commonly represented in diagrams as an inverted knight.

== Movement ==
In the diagram below, the white camel on d4 can move to the squares marked with black dots (a3, a5, c1, c7, e1, e7, g3 and g5).

Position: c7 black circle, e7 black circle, a5 black circle, g5 black circle, d4 white upside-down knight, a3 black circle, g3 black circle, c1 black circle, e1 black circle

The camel (represented as an inverted knight) may move to any of eight squares (black dots).

== History and nomenclature ==
The camel is a very old chess piece, appearing in some early chess variants, such as Tamerlane chess. It also appears in some modern variants, such as wildebeest chess.

== Value ==
The camel by itself is worth about two pawns (appreciably less than a knight) because of its colorboundedness and lack of sufficient freedom of movement on an 8×8 board. However, a king, a bishop, and a camel can force checkmate on a bare king, assuming that the bishop and the camel are not on the same square color; a king, a knight, and a camel can usually force checkmate on a bare king, but not easily, and there are thirteen types of fortress draws; lastly, a king, a camel, and a wazir can sometimes force checkmate on a bare king, but it can take up to 77 moves. A king and two camels cannot checkmate a lone king, even if the camels are on different square colors. While the rook versus camel endgame is usually a draw, more winning positions exist than there are in rook versus knight and rook versus bishop endgames; the longest win takes 35 moves. (All endgame statistics mentioned are for the 8×8 board.)

== Usage and value as a component ==
Position: a8 three, c8 three, e8 one, g8 one, b7 two, d7 two, f7 two, h7 two, a6 three, c6 one, e6 three, g6 three, b5 four, d5 two, f5 white upside-down knight, h5 two, a4 three, c4 one, e4 three, g4 three, b3 two, d3 two, f3 two, h3 two, a2 three, c2 three, e2 one, g2 one, b1 two, d1 two, f1 four, h1 two

Distance from the f5-square, counted in camel moves. The dark squares cannot be reached, as the camel is colorbound.

As a component of other pieces, the camel has about the same value as a knight (both pieces can move to at most eight squares). The camel plus ferz compound is used in Omega Chess, where it is called a wizard, and the camel plus king compound is used in Paulovits's Game, where it is called a general.

Its long move carries the danger of unstoppable attacks in the opening and of capturing winning large amounts of material. For example, if a camel plus wazir compound (CW in Betza's funny notation) replaces White's queenside rook, then White can immediately win material with 1.(CW)b4, threatening 2.(CW)e5 to win the black queen and 2.(CW)b5 to win the black rook on a8; the threats cannot both be parried.

== See also ==
- Giraffe, a (1,4)-leaper
- Zebra, a (2,3)-leaper
