= Ferz =

Fairy chess piece

Position: c5 black pawn, e5 white circle, d4 white upside-down bishop, c3 white circle, e3 white circle

The ferz on d4, represented by an inverted bishop, may move to c3, e3, or e5, or capture the pawn on c5.

The ferz or fers is a fairy chess piece that may move one square diagonally. It was used in orthodox chess and in shatranj before being replaced by the queen.

== History and nomenclature ==
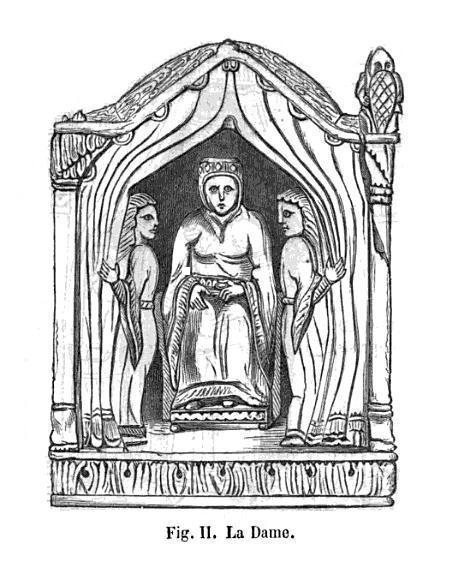
Illustration of a queen (French: La Dame) from the Charlemagne chessmen, when she had the move of a ferz

The ferz is a very old piece, appearing in chaturanga, the ancestor of all chess variants; it also featured in games such as Tamerlane chess. The ferz was a standard chess piece until the modern moves of queen and bishop were developed around the 15th century, with the ferz being replaced by the former.

The ferz also appears in some large historical shogi variants, such as in dai shogi under the name 'cat sword' (Japanese: 猫刄, romanized: myōjin). The Thai variant of chess, makruk, retains the ferz from shatranj as the "met", both as a starting piece and as the only pawn promotion option. Thus, much of shatranj endgame theory is also valid for makruk. In xiangqi, the 'advisor' (Chinese: 士; pinyin: shì) shares the moves of the ferz, but is confined to the palace.

The piece was originally called the mantri (Sanskrit for 'minister' or 'counsellor'), which was translated by the Persians to farzin or farzīn (فرزین), which means 'counsellor' or 'wise man'. This was shortened to ferz, and this became firz or fers in medieval Europe. Its name later changed to queen, but when that name started being used for the modern chess queen, its former name ferz or fers began to be used in chess problems. In modern Eastern Slavic languages, however, ferz (ферзь) is the current name for the chess queen. The piece was also known as vizir and is still called as such in Northern India.

== Value ==
The ferz by itself is worth about half a knight. A king and three ferzes can force checkmate on a bare king if not all three ferzes are on the same square color; a king and two ferzes on opposite-colored squares can force stalemate on a bare king, but not easily, and they cannot force checkmate. The endgame of rook versus ferz is a win for the rook. Despite being colorbound, the ferz is the strongest of the basic leapers during the opening phase of the game, even stronger than the wazir, due to its larger mobility forward. A wazir and a ferz can force checkmate on a bare king only if the bare king is significantly close to a corner that is the same color square as that of the ferz. While a knight and wazir can usually force checkmate against a bare king, a knight and ferz can only do so if the bare king is significantly close to a corner that is the same color square as that of the ferz. The wazir is better than the ferz in most endgames because of the wazir's ability to restrict squares adjacent to the squares last restricted.

== Symbol ==
Both white and black symbols for the ferz were encoded in Unicode 17.0, in the Chess Symbols block:

- 🩔 U+1FA54 WHITE CHESS FERZ
- 🩖 U+1FA56 BLACK CHESS FERZ
