= Fairy chess piece =

Chess piece with non-standard movement rules

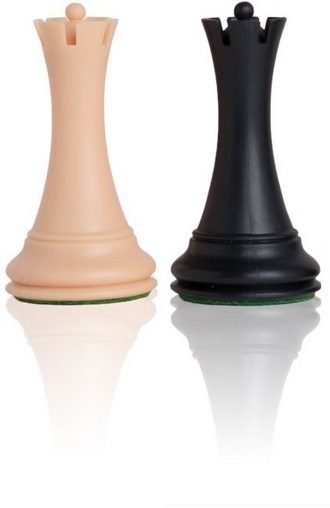
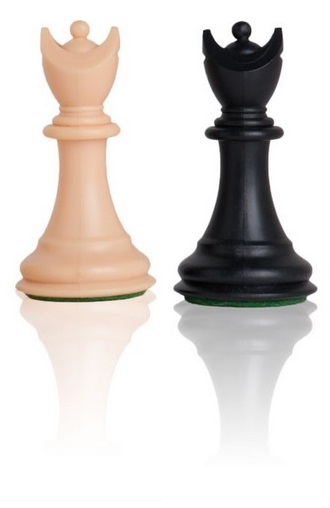
One Staunton style design for the empress (left) and princess (right) chessmen used in Capablanca chess and other similar chess variants.

A fairy chess piece, variant chess piece, unorthodox chess piece, or heterodox chess piece is a chess piece not used in conventional chess but incorporated into certain chess variants and some unorthodox chess problems, known as fairy chess. Compared to conventional pieces, fairy pieces vary mostly in the way they move, but they may also follow special rules for capturing, promotions, etc. Because of the distributed and uncoordinated nature of unorthodox chess development, the same piece can have different names, and different pieces can have the same name in various contexts.

Most are symbolised as inverted or rotated icons of the standard pieces in diagrams, and the meanings of these "wildcards" must be defined in each context separately. Pieces invented for use in chess variants rather than problems sometimes instead have special icons designed for them, but with some exceptions (the princess, empress, and occasionally amazon), many of these are not used beyond the individual games for which they were invented.

== Background ==
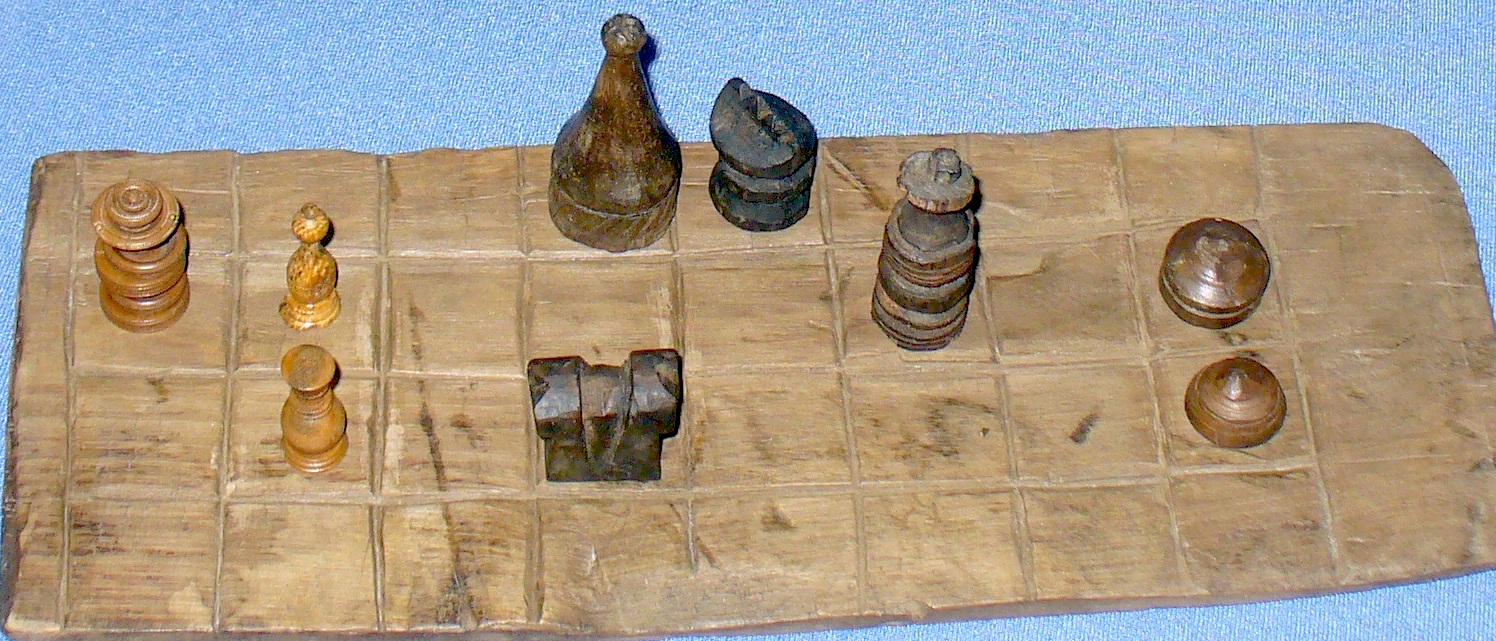
Fragment of a chessboard and chess pieces from 17th-century Russia. This may once have been a "standard" form of chess in a particular area.

The earliest known forms of chess date from the 7th century in Persia (chatrang) and India (chaturanga). They had different rules from the modern game. The game was passed to the Arabs, then to the Europeans, and for several centuries, it was played with those ancient rules. For example, the queen was once able to move only a single square diagonally, while the bishop could jump two squares diagonally. The change of rules occurred in Spain in the end of the 15th century when the queen and the bishop were given their modern moves. In the old Muslim manuscripts those two pieces were referred as ferz (meaning advisor) and fil (meaning elephant). The queen is still called ferz and the bishop is called slon (elephant) in Russian and Ukrainian. The bishop is still called alfil (from al fil, using the article) in Spanish. Due to the pieces' change in movement, the ferz and the alfil are considered non-standard chess pieces. As those who created modern chess did in the 15th century, chess enthusiasts may still create their own rule variations and how the pieces move. Pieces that move differently from standard rules are called "variant" or "fairy" chess pieces.

The names of fairy pieces are not standardised, and most do not have standard symbols associated with them. Most are represented in diagrams by rotated versions of the icons for normal pieces, though a few exceptions sometimes get their own icons: the equihopper and the knighted pieces (princess, empress, and amazon), and a few of the basic leapers (e.g. wazir, ferz, and alfil). The common names for the pieces are used here whenever possible, but these names sometimes differ between circles associated with chess problems and circles associated with chess variants.

== Classification ==
Many of the simplest fairy chess pieces do not appear in the orthodox game, but they usually fall into one of three classes. There are also compound pieces that combine the movement powers of two or more different pieces.

Directions are defined as orthogonal (i.e. horizontal or vertical), like a rook; diagonal, like a bishop; and hippogonal, like a knight.

=== Simple pieces ===
==== Step-movers ====
Pieces that move a single square, such as a king in standard chess, are called step-movers in the context of shogi variants, but in fairy chess they are merged into the class of leapers for generality. Pieces that make hippogonal moves but cannot bypass intervening pieces, such as the xiangqi horse, may also be considered step-movers. Pieces that move a limited number of squares diagonally or orthogonally might also be considered step movers but are generally called limited ranging piece (see below).

==== Leapers ====
Names and moves of the leapers
m n	0	1	2	3	4
0	Zero (0)	Wazir (W)	Dabbaba (D)	Threeleaper (H)	Fourleaper
1	Wazir (W)	Ferz (F)	Knight (N)	Camel (C)	Giraffe
2	Dabbaba (D)	Knight (N)	Alfil (A)	Zebra (Z)	Stag
3	Threeleaper (H)	Camel (C)	Zebra (Z)	Tripper (G)	Antelope
4	Fourleaper	Giraffe	Stag	Antelope	Commuter
Piece names may vary. This table uses each piece's most common name.

A leaper is a piece that moves directly to a square a fixed distance away. A leaper captures by occupying the square on which an enemy piece sits. The leaper's move cannot be blocked (unlike elephant and horse in xiangqi and janggi) – it "leaps" over any intervening pieces – so the check of a leaper cannot be parried by interposing. Leapers are not able to create pins, but are effective forking pieces.

Moves by a leaper may be described using the distance to their landing square – the number of squares orthogonally in one direction and the number of squares orthogonally at right angles. For instance, the orthodox knight is described as a (1,2)-leaper or a (2,1)-leaper. The table to the right shows common (but by no means standard) names for the leapers reaching up to 4 squares, together with the letter used to represent them in Betza notation, a common notation for describing fairy pieces.

In shatranj, a Persian forerunner to chess, the predecessors of the bishop and queen were leapers: the alfil is a (2,2)-leaper (moving two squares diagonally in any direction), and the ferz a (1,1)-leaper (moving one square diagonally in any direction). The wazir is a (0,1)-leaper (an "orthogonal" one-square leaper). The dabbaba is a (0,2)-leaper. The 'level-3' leapers are the threeleaper (0,3), camel (1,3), zebra (2,3), and tripper (3,3). The fourleaper (0,4), giraffe (1,4), stag (2,4), antelope (3,4), and commuter (4,4) are level-4 leapers. Many of these basic leapers appear in Tamerlane chess.

a5	b5	c5	d5	e5
a4	b4 black circle	c4	d4 black circle	e4
a3	b3	c3 B l	d3	e3
a2	b2 black circle	c2	d2 black circle	e2
a1	b1	c1	d1	e1

Ferz (notation F)

a5 black circle	b5	c5	d5	e5 black circle
a4	b4	c4	d4	e4
a3	b3	c3 white upside-down bishop	d3	e3
a2	b2	c2	d2	e2
a1 black circle	b1	c1	d1	e1 black circle

Alfil (notation A), can jump.

a5	b5	c5	d5	e5
a4	b4	c4 black circle	d4	e4
a3	b3 black circle	c3 white upside-down rook	d3 black circle	e3
a2	b2	c2 black circle	d2	e2
a1	b1	c1	d1	e1

Wazir (notation W)

a5	b5	c5 black circle	d5	e5
a4	b4	c4	d4	e4
a3 black circle	b3	c3 white upside-down rook	d3	e3 black circle
a2	b2	c2	d2	e2
a1	b1	c1 black circle	d1	e1

Dabbaba (notation D), can jump.

==== Riders ====
A rider, or ranging piece, is a piece that moves an unlimited distance in one direction, provided there are no pieces in the way. Each basic rider corresponds to a basic leaper, and can be thought of as repeating that leaper's move in one direction until an obstacle is reached. If the obstacle is a friendly piece, it blocks further movement; if the obstacle is an enemy piece, it may be captured, but it cannot be jumped over.

There are three riders in orthodox chess: the rook is a (0,1)-rider; the bishop is a (1,1)-rider; and the queen combines both patterns. Sliders are a special case of riders that can only move between geometrically contiguous cells. All of the riders in orthodox chess are examples of sliders.

Position: e8 black cross, d6 black cross, h5 black cross, a4 black cross, c4 black cross, f4 black cross, d3 black cross, b2 white upside-down knight, d1 black cross

Nightrider (represented by an inverted knight) makes any number of knight moves in the same direction.

Position: a8 black upside-down knight, c7 white queen, e6 white rook, g4 black king, b3 white pawn, e3 black pawn, a2 white pawn, b2 white pawn, c2 black cross, a1 white upside-down knight, b1 black bishop, g1 white king

The white nightrider on a1 is blocked from reaching c5 by its pawn on b3. It may travel to c2 independent of the pieces on a2, b2, and b1. It may capture the enemy pawn on e3, but may not continue on to g4, so the black king is not in check. The black e-pawn is pinned, as moving it exposes its king to check. The white queen and rook are skewered by the black nightrider on a8. Hence, NNxe3+ is possible.

Riders can create both pins and skewers. One popular fairy chess rider is the nightrider, which can make an unlimited number of knight moves in any single direction. (Most fairy-chess riders cannot change direction partway through a move, though some riders in large shogi variants can; see "bent rider" below.) A nightrider is a leaper only at the local level: it is blocked by any piece on a square one of its component knight moves would fall on. That is, if a nightrider starts on a1, it can be blocked on b3 or c2, but not on a2, b2, or b1. It can only travel from a1 to c5 (a 2,4 move) if the intervening square b3 (a 1,2 move away in the same direction) is unoccupied. The names of other riders are often obtained by compounding the name of its base leaper with "rider". For example, the zebrarider is a (2,3)-rider, which can make any multiple of a (2,3) move as long as no intervening (2,3) square is occupied.

Some riders do not follow a straight path. The aanca from the historical game of Grant Acedrex is such a "bent rider": it takes its first step like a ferz and continues outward from that destination like a rook. The unicorn, from the same game, takes its first step like a knight and continues outward from that destination like a bishop. The rose, which is used in chess on a really big board, traces out a path of knight moves on an approximate regular octagon: from e1, it can go to g2, h4, g6, e7, c6, b4, c2, and back to e1. The crooked bishop or boyscout follows a zigzag: starting from f1, its path could take it to e2, f3, e4, f5, e6, f7, and e8 (or g2, f3, g4, f5, g6, f7, and g8).

A limited ranging piece moves like a rider, but only up to a specific number of steps. An example is the short rook from Chess with different armies: it moves like a rook, but only up to a distance of 4 squares. From a1, it can travel in one move to b1, c1, d1, or e1, but not f1. A rider's corresponding leaper can be thought of as a limited ranging piece with a range of 1: a wazir is a rook restricted to moving only one square at a time. The violent ox and flying dragon from dai shogi (an ancient form of Japanese chess) are a range-2 rook and a range-2 bishop respectively.

There are other possible generalisations as well; the picket from Tamerlane chess moves like a bishop, but at least two squares (thus it cannot stop on the square next to it, but it can be blocked there). These are in general called ski-pieces: the picket is a ski-bishop. A skip-rider skips over the first and then every odd cell in its path: it cannot be blocked on the squares it skips. Thus a skip-rook would be a dabbabarider, and a skip-bishop would be an alfilrider. A slip-rider is similar, but skips over the second and then every even cell in its path.

In some shogi variants (variants of Japanese chess), there are also area moves. These are similar to limited ranging pieces in that the pieces with such moves repeat one kind of basic step up to a fixed number of times, and must stop when they capture. However, unlike other riders, they may change direction during their move, and do not have a fixed path shape like riders or bent riders do.

==== Hoppers ====
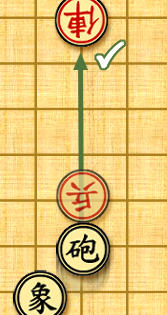
The long-range threat of a cannon (砲): move shown is of 砲 (here it is capturing "俥").

A hopper is a piece that moves by jumping over another piece (called a hurdle). The hurdle can be any single piece of any color. Unless it can jump over a piece, a hopper cannot move. Note that hoppers generally capture by taking the piece on the destination square, not by taking the hurdle (as is the case in checkers). The exceptions are locusts which are pieces that capture by hopping over its victim. They are sometimes considered a type of hopper.

An equihopper must cover the same distance beyond the hurdle as before it.

There are no hoppers in Western chess. In xiangqi (Chinese chess), the cannon captures as a hopper along rook lines (when not capturing, it is a (0,1)-rider which cannot jump, the same as a rook); in janggi (Korean chess), the cannon is a hopper along rook lines when moving or capturing, except it cannot jump another cannon, whether friendly or enemy. The grasshopper moves along the same lines as a queen, hopping over another piece and landing on the square immediately beyond it. Yang Qi includes the diagonal counterpart of the cannon, the vao, which moves as a bishop and captures as a hopper along bishop lines.

=== Compound pieces ===
Compound pieces combine the powers of two or more pieces. The queen may be considered the compound of a rook and a bishop. The king of standard chess combines the ferz and wazir, ignoring restrictions on check and checkmate and ignoring castling. The alibaba combines the dabbaba and alfil, while the squirrel can move to any square 2 units away (combining the knight and alibaba). The phoenix combines the wazir and alfil, while the kirin combines the ferz and dabbaba: both appear in chu shogi, an old Japanese chess variant that is still sometimes played today.

An amphibian is a combined leaper with a larger range than any of its components, such as the frog, a (1,1)-(0,3)-leaper. Although the (1,1)-leaper is confined to one half of the board, and the (0,3)-leaper to one ninth, their combination can reach any square on the board.

When one of the combined pieces is a knight, the compound may be called a knighted piece. The princess, empress, and amazon are three popular compound pieces, combining the powers of non-royal orthodox chess pieces. They are the knighted bishop, knighted rook, and knighted queen respectively. When one of the combined pieces is a king, the compound may be called a crowned piece. The crowned knight combines the knight with the king's moves (when royal, it is called a knighted king). The dragon king of shogi is a crowned rook (rook + king), while the dragon horse is a crowned bishop (bishop + king). The knighted compounds show that a compound piece may not fall into any of the three basic categories from above: a princess slides for its bishop moves (and can be blocked by obstacles in those directions), but leaps for its knight moves (and cannot be blocked in those directions). (The names princess and empress are common in the problemist tradition: in chess variants involving these pieces they are often called by other names, such as archbishop and chancellor in Capablanca chess, or cardinal and marshal in Grand Chess, respectively.) Combinations of known pieces with the falcon from falcon chess are named winged pieces, in Complete Permutation Chess not only winged knight, bishop, rook, and queen are featured, but also winged marshal, winged cardinal, and winged amazon.

Marine pieces are compound pieces consisting of a rider or leaper (for ordinary moves) and a locust (for captures) in the same directions. Marine pieces have names alluding to the sea and its myths, e.g., nereide (marine bishop), triton (marine rook), mermaid (marine queen), and poseidon (marine king). Examples named for non-mythical sea creatures include the seahorse (marine knight), dolphin (marine nightrider), anemone (marine guard or mann), and prawn (marine pawn). Games that consist of these marine pieces, known as "sea chesses", are often played on larger boards to account for these pieces needing more squares available for their locust-like capturing moves.

=== Restricted pieces ===
In addition to combining the powers of pieces, pieces can also be modified by restricting them in certain ways: for example, their power might only be used for moving, only for capturing, only forwards, only backwards, only sideways, only on their first move, only on a specific square, only against a specific piece, and so on. The horse in xiangqi (Chinese chess) is a knight that cannot leap: it can be blocked on the square orthogonally adjacent to it. The stone general from dai shogi is a ferz that can only move forwards (and therefore is trapped when it reaches the end of the board).

Such restrictions may themselves be combined. The gold general from shogi (Japanese chess) is the combination of a wazir and a forward-only ferz; the silver general from shogi is the combination of a ferz and a forward-only wazir. The pawn has the power of a wazir, but only forward and for movement; the power of a ferz, but only forward and for capturing; the power of a rook with a limited range of 2 squares, but only forward, without capturing, and on its first move; the power to be replaced by a more powerful piece, but only upon reaching its last rank; and the power to capture en passant. A piece that moves and captures differently, like the pawn, is called divergent.

There are some powerful notation systems, described below, that can more succinctly represent arbitrary combinations of the basic restrictions of basic pieces.

=== Capturing ===
All of the above pieces move once per turn and capture by replacement (i.e., moving to their victim's square and replacing it) except in the case of the en passant capture. A shooting piece (as in Rifle Chess) does not capture by replacement (it stays in place when making a capture). Such a shooting capture is termed igui 居喰い "stationary feeding" in the old Japanese variants where it is common. Baroque chess has many examples of pieces that do not capture by replacement, such as the withdrawer, a piece which captures an adjacent piece by moving directly away from it.

=== Moving multiple times per turn ===
The lion in chu shogi, as do the pieces in Marseillais chess, can move twice per turn: such pieces are common in the old Japanese variants of chess, termed shogi variants, where they are called lion moves after the simplest example. The lion is a king with the power to move twice per turn: thus it can capture a piece and then move on, possibly capturing another, or returning to its original square. When a double-moving piece captures and then returns to its original square, it acts like a shooting piece.

=== Games ===
Red/black elephants (alfils)

Red/black cannons

Xiangqi game piece disks

Keima
(the knight)

Hisha
(the rook)

Shogi game pieces

Some classes of pieces come from a certain game, and will have common characteristics. Examples are the pieces from xiangqi, a Chinese game similar to chess. The most common are the leo, pao and vao (derived from the Chinese cannon) and the mao (derived from the horse). Those derived from the cannon are distinguished by moving as a hopper when capturing, but otherwise moving as a rider.

Pieces from xiangqi are usually circular disks, labeled or engraved with a Chinese character identifying the piece. Pieces from shogi (Japanese chess) are usually wedge-shaped chips, with kanji characters identifying the piece.

=== Special attributes ===
Fairy pieces vary in the way they move, but some may also have other special characteristics or powers. The joker (in one of its definitions) mimics the last move made by the opponent. So for example, if White moves a bishop, Black can follow by moving the joker as a bishop. The orphan has no movement powers of its own, but moves like any enemy piece attacking it: so if a rook attacks an orphan, the orphan now has the movement powers of the rook, but those are lost if the enemy rook moves away. Orphans can use these relayed powers to attack each other, creating a chain.

A royal piece is one which must not be allowed to be captured. If a royal piece is threatened with capture and cannot avoid capture the next move, then the game is lost (a generalization of checkmate). In orthodox chess, the kings are royal. In fairy chess any other piece may instead be royal, and there may be more than one, or none at all (in which case the winning condition must be some other goal, such as capturing all of the opponent's pieces or promoting a pawn). Tamerlane chess and chu shogi allow multiple royals to be created via promotion. With multiple royal pieces the game can be won by capturing one of them (absolute royalty), or capturing all of them (extinction royalty). The rules can also impose a limit to the number of royals that are allowed to be left in check. In Spartan chess, Black has two kings, and they may not both be left in check even though they can not both be captured in one turn. In Rex Multiplex, a fairy chess condition, pawns can promote to king: a move that checks multiple kings at once is illegal unless all the checks can be resolved on the next move; checkmate happens when a move checkmates all kings of the opposite colour. (A player may not expose any of their kings to check or checkmate, even if it is to resolve checks or checkmates on other attacked kings.)

Pieces, when moving, can also create effects (temporary or permanent) on themselves or on other pieces. In knight relay chess, a knight grants any friendly piece it protects the ability to move like a knight. This ability is temporary and expires when the piece is no longer protected by a knight. In Andernach chess, a piece that moves or captures changes its colour; in volage, a genre of fairy chess problems, a piece changes colour the first time it moves from a light square to a dark square (vice versa), after which its colour is fixed. In Madrasi chess, two pieces of the same kind but different colour attacking each other temporarily paralyse each other: neither may move until the mutual attack is broken by an outside piece. The basilisk from Ralph Betza's Nemoroth inflicts a permanent form of this paralysis (but paralysed pieces may be pushed by the go away, another piece in the game, so they are only prevented from moving of their own accord); the ghast from the same game restricts friendly pieces within two squares of it to moves that take them geometrically further from it, and compels enemy pieces to do so (similar to the compulsion of resolving check in orthodox chess). The immobiliser from Baroque chess immobilises any piece next to it; the fire demon from tenjiku shogi and poison flame from ko shogi capture any enemy pieces that end the turn next to them. The teaching king and Buddhist spirit from maka dai dai shogi are "contagious"; any piece that captures a teaching king or a Buddhist spirit becomes one. (This can be considered as a kind of forced promotion.)

Pieces may promote to other pieces, as the pawn automatically does in orthodox chess on the last rank: the pawn has a choice of what it promotes to. In xiangqi, pawns automatically promote as soon as they cross the river in the middle of the board, but this promotion is fixed and only gives them the power to move sideways as well as forward. In shogi, the pawn is not the only piece that can promote; promotion can occur if a move takes place partly or wholly in the last three ranks from the player's viewpoint, and is optional unless the piece could not move further, but a piece's promotion is fixed. In dai dai shogi, promotion (again fixed depending on the piece) happens when a piece that can promote makes a capture, and may not be refused.

Pieces may also have restrictions on where they can go. In xiangqi, the general and advisors may not leave their palaces (a 3×3 section of the board for each player). The topology of the board can also be changed, and some pieces may respect it while others ignore it. In Tamerlane chess, only a king, prince, or adventitious king may enter the opponent's citadel, and only the adventitious king may enter its own citadel. In cylindrical chess, the left and right edges are joined to each other so a rook can continue to the right from h1 and end up on a1. It would be possible to have both cylindrical pieces and normal pieces on the same board.

Pieces may also have restriction on how they can be captured. An iron piece may not be captured at all. There are other possibilities, like a piece that can be captured by some pieces but not others, which is common in ko shogi (e.g. a shield unit is invulnerable to bows and guns). In Ralph Betza's Jupiter army, the Jovian bishop is a Nemesis ferz: it cannot capture, it cannot increase its distance from the enemy king, and it may not be captured (except possibly by the enemy king itself; Betza vacillated on this point).

Such special characteristics of pieces are normally not included in the notations describing the movement of fairy pieces, and are usually explained separately.

=== Higher dimensions ===
Some three-dimensional chess variants also exist, such as Raumschach, along with pieces that take advantage of the extra dimension on the board.

Ea5	Eb5	Ec5	Ed5	Ee5
Ea4	Eb4	Ec4	Ed4	Ee4
Ea3	Eb3	Ec3	Ed3	Ee3
Ea2	Eb2 black circle	Ec2	Ed2	Ee2
Ea1	Eb1	Ec1	Ed1	Ee1

E

Da5	Db5	Dc5 black circle	Dd5	De5 black circle
Da4	Db4	Dc4	Dd4	De4
Da3	Db3	Dc3 black circle	Dd3	De3 black circle
Da2	Db2	Dc2	Dd2	De2
Da1	Db1	Dc1	Dd1	De1

D

Ca5	Cb5	Cc5	Cd5	Ce5
Ca4	Cb4	Cc4	Cd4 white unicorn	Ce4
Ca3	Cb3	Cc3	Cd3	Ce3
Ca2	Cb2	Cc2	Cd2	Ce2
Ca1	Cb1	Cc1	Cd1	Ce1

C

Ba5	Bb5	Bc5 black circle	Bd5	Be5 black circle
Ba4	Bb4	Bc4	Bd4	Be4
Ba3	Bb3	Bc3 black circle	Bd3	Be3 black circle
Ba2	Bb2	Bc2	Bd2	Be2
Ba1	Bb1	Bc1	Bd1	Be1

B

Aa5	Ab5	Ac5	Ad5	Ae5
Aa4	Ab4	Ac4	Ad4	Ae4
Aa3	Ab3	Ac3	Ad3	Ae3
Aa2	Ab2 black circle	Ac2	Ad2	Ae2
Aa1	Ab1	Ac1	Ad1	Ae1

A
In Raumschach the Unicorn moves through the vertices of cubes (i.e. along a space diagonal). The unicorn on Cd4 can move to squares with black dots. The boards are stacked, with board E on top.

Chess variants and fairy piece movements with even more than three dimensions also exist. For example, the chess variant video game 5D Chess with Multiverse Time Travel has four usable dimensions of movement. One of the fairy pieces featured in the game is known as the dragon, which must use all four dimensions when moving. In particular, it may move any distance along four dimensions, an equal distance along each one, as long as there is no piece blocking the movement in the middle of the path. The game refers to a straight line of squares forming such a path as a quadragonal.

== Notations ==
=== Parlett's movement notation ===
In his book The Oxford History of Board Games David Parlett used a notation to describe fairy piece movements. The move is specified in the form m={expression}, where m stands for "move", and the expression is composed from the following elements:

- Distance (numbers, n)
  - 1 – a distance of one (i.e. to adjacent square)
  - 2 – a distance of two
  - n – any distance in the given direction
- Direction (punctuation, X)
  - + – orthogonally (four possible directions)
  - > – orthogonally forwards
  - < – orthogonally backwards
  - <> – orthogonally forwards and backwards
  - = – orthogonally sideways (used here instead of Parlett's divide symbol ÷)
  - >= – orthogonally forwards or sideways
  - <= – orthogonally backwards or sideways
  - X – diagonally (four possible directions)
  - X> – diagonally forwards
  - X< – diagonally backwards
  - ✳ – orthogonally or diagonally (all eight possible directions); same as +X; Parlett uses *
- Grouping
  - / – two orthogonal moves separated by a slash denote a hippogonal move (i.e. jumps like a knight)
  - & – repeated movement in the same direction, such as for hippogonal riders (e.g., the nightrider)
  - . – then, (e.g., an aanca is 1X.n+; one step diagonally and then any distance orthogonally outwards)

==== Additions to Parlett's ====
The following can be added to Parlett's to make it more complete:

- Conditions under which the move may occur (lowercase alphanumeric, except n)
  - (default) – May occur at any point in the game
  - i – May only be made on the initial move (e.g. pawn's 2 moves forward)
  - c – May only be made on a capture (e.g. pawn's diagonal capture)
  - o – May not be used for a capture (e.g. pawn's forward move)
- Move type
  - (default) – Captures by landing on the piece; blocked by intermediate pieces
  - ~ – Leaper (leaps); captures by landing on the opposing piece
  - ^ – Locust (captures by hopping; implies hopper); capture move is one square past the captured piece
- Grouping (punctuation)
  - , (comma) – separates move options; only one of the comma-delimited options may be chosen per move
  - () – grouping operator; see nightrider
  - - – range operator

The format (not including grouping) is: <conditions> <move type> <distance> <direction> <other>

On this basis, the traditional chess moves (excluding castling and en passant capture) are:

- King: 1✳
- Queen: n✳
- Bishop: nX
- Rook: n+
- Pawn: o1>, c1X>, oi2>
- Knight: ~1/2

=== Ralph Betza's "funny notation" ===
Ralph Betza created a classification scheme for fairy chess pieces (including standard chess pieces) in terms of the moves of basic pieces with modifiers.

Capital letters stand for basic leap movements, ranging from single-square orthogonal moves to 3×3 diagonal leaps: Wazir, Ferz, Dabbaba, KNight, Alfil, THreeleaper (ortHogonal), Camel, Zebra, and diaGonal (3,3)-leaper. C and Z are equivalent to obsolete letters L (Long Knight) and J (Jump) which are no longer commonly used. Longer leaps are specified here by a vector, such as (1,4) for the giraffe.

Betza's "atomic" notation of pieces' moves
Atom	Name	Board step
W	Wazir	(1,0)
F	Ferz	(1,1)
D	Dabbaba	(2,0)
N	Knight	(2,1)
A	Alfil	(2,2)
H	Threeleaper	(3,0)
C (formerly L)	Camel	(3,1)
Z (formerly J)	Zebra	(3,2)
G	Tripper	(3,3)

A leaper is converted into a rider by doubling its letter. For example, WW describes a rook, FF describes a bishop, and NN describes a nightrider. The second letter can instead be a number, which is a limitation on how many times the leap motion can be repeated; for example, W4 describes a rook limited to 4 spaces of movement. R4 is an old synonym for W4.

Combining multiple movement letters into a string means the piece can use any of the available options. For example, WF describes a king, capable of moving one space orthogonally or diagonally.

Standard chess pieces except pawns (which are particularly complex) and knights (which are a basic leap movement) have their own letters available; K = WF, Q = WWFF, B = FF, R = WW.

All mentioned capitals refer to a maximally symmetric set of moves that can be used for both moving and capturing. Lowercase letters in front of the capital letters modify the component, usually restricting the moves to a subset. They can be distinguished in directional, modal and other modifiers. Basic directional modifiers are: forward, backward, right, left. On non-orthogonal moves these indicate pairs of moves, and a second modifier of the perpendicular type is needed to fully specify a single direction. Otherwise, when multiple directions are mentioned, it means that moves in all these directions are possible. The prefix notations sideways and vertical are shorthands for lr and fb, respectively. Modal modifiers are move only, capture only. Other modifiers are jumping (basic distant leap must jump, cannot move without a hurdle), non-jumping like the Chinese elephant, grasshopper (a rider that moves only by landing on the square immediately beyond the first piece it encounters), pao (a rider that moves only by landing any number of squares beyond the first piece it encounters, but not beyond a second piece), o cylindrical (moving off one side of the board wraps to the other), z crooked (moving in a zigzag line like the boyscout), q circular movement (like the rose), and then (for pieces that start moving in one direction and then continue in another, like the gryphon).

In addition, Betza has also suggested adding brackets to his notation: q[WF]q[FW] would be a circular king, which can move from e4 to f5 (first the ferz move) then g5, h4, h3, g2, f2, e3, and back to e4, effectively passing a turn, and could also start from e4 to f4 (first the wazir move) then g5, g6, f7, e7, d6, d5, and back to e4.

Example: The standard chess pawn can be described as mfWcfF (ignoring the initial double move).

There is no standard order of the components and modifiers. Betza often plays with the order to create somehow pronounceable piece names and artistic word play.

Betza's notation for the fundamental leapers
X Y	−3	−2	−1	0	1	2	3
3	G	Z	C	H	C	Z	G
2	Z	A	N	D	N	A	Z
1	C	N	F	W	F	N	C
0	H	D	W	0	W	D	H
−1	C	N	F	W	F	N	C
−2	Z	A	N	D	N	A	Z
−3	G	Z	C	H	C	Z	G

Note that this table is a special case of the Cartesian coordinate plane, where the origin is always the current location of the piece about to move.

==== Addition to Betza's notation ('XBetza') ====
Betza does not use the small letter i. It is used here for initial in the description of the different types of pawns. The letter a is used here to describe again, indicating the piece can make the move on which it is prefixed multiple times, possibly with new modifiers mentioned behind the a, which then apply to the second 'leg' of the move. Directional specifications for such a continuation step should be interpreted relative to the first step (e.g. aW is a two-step orthogonal move that can change direction; afW is a two-step orthogonal move that must continue the same direction).

To handle some frequently encountered special moves, e can be used next to m and c to indicate en-passant capture, i.e. capture of the piece that just made a move with i & n modifier, by moving to the square where the n implies it could have been blocked. (This makes the full description of the FIDE pawn mfWcefFimfnD.) An O with a range specifier is used to indicate castling with the furthest piece in that direction in the initial setup, the range indicating the number of squares the king moves (orthodox castling: ismO2). XBetza overloads some modifiers, by giving them an alternative meaning where the original meaning makes no sense. E.g. i in a continuation leg ('iso') indicates the length must be the same as the previous riding leg, useful for indicating rifle captures (caibR).

Non-final legs of a multi-leg move also have the option to end on an occupied square without disturbing its contents. To indicate this the modifier p is used, and thus has a slightly different meaning than on final legs; the traditional meaning can then be seen as shorthand for paf. To make the a notation more versatile, it can also be used when the moves of the two legs are not exactly congruent: g is an alternative to indicates a non-final leg to an occupied square, but in contrast to p it specifies a 'range toggle', converting a mentioned rider move into the corresponding leaper move (e.g. R ⟷ W) for the next leg, and vice versa (making the traditional g shorthand for gaf). A similar range toggle on reaching an empty square can be indicated by y, to indicate a slider spontaneously turns a corner after starting with a leap. Continuation directions will always be encoded in the 8-fold (K) system, even when the initial leg only had 4-fold symmetry. Mention of an intermediate direction on a 4-fold-symmetrical move would then swap orthogonal moves to the corresponding diagonal moves, (e.g. W ⟷ F) and vice versa. (So mafsW is the xiangqi horse, move to an empty W-square, and continue one F-step at 45 degree, and FyafsF is the gryphon.)

Bex notation also adds many extensions for indicating different modes of capture: where a simple c describes replacement capture as in chess, the notations [ca], [cw], [cl] describe capture by approach, withdrawal, leaping over, etc. [crM] describes rifle capture (i.e. annihilating enemy pieces without moving), and specifies with the atom M it contains what can be captured that way. Bex notation also introduces a way to describe exotic effects as a step in a longer move. E.g. [xo] as final move step indicates returning to the square of origin, [xiK] means immobilize all pieces a K step away from the current square, while [x!iK] would similarly mobilize such neighbors. [xwN] would denote a position swap with a piece an N leap away. None of these things can be specified in the original Betza notation, but the downside is that the notations are completely ad-hoc, and do not follow from an underlying principle.

=== Notation used by problemists ===
The British Chess Problem Society (BCPS) provides notations for many fairy chess pieces, extending the standard algebraic notation for chess. The notation consists of one or two capital letters or of one capital letter followed by a digit. It is noteworthy that the notation of the standard Knight is the letter S (from German Springer, meaning leaper) and the single letter N denotes the Nightrider. The notation for the Wazir is WE (from German Wesir) while the notation WA denotes the Waran (Rook + Nightrider).

== Relative value of pieces ==
As with piece values in traditional chess, fairy pieces have values assigned for use in scoring and strategising. While a large amount of information can be found concerning the relative value of variant chess pieces, there are few resources where it is in a concise format for more than just a few piece types. One challenge of producing such a summary is that piece values are dependent upon the size of boards they are played on, and the combination of other pieces on the board; even when the same game format is assumed (board size and combination of other pieces), there is often little agreement on the specific value of many other pieces.

On an 8×8 board, the standard chess pieces (pawn, knight, bishop, rook, and queen) are usually given values of 1, 3, 3, 5, and 9 respectively. When the basic pieces wazir (W), ferz (F), and non-royal king (WF = K) are played with a similar mix of pieces, they are typically valued at around 1, 1.5, and 3 points respectively. Three popular compound pieces, the princess (BN), empress (RN), and amazon (QN), have been estimated to have point values around 8, 8.5, and 12, respectively. The values of other pieces are not well established; compound pieces are sometimes approximated as the sum of their component pieces, or estimated to be slightly higher due to synergistic effects (such as it is for the princess and empress).

Musketeer Chess, a modern chess variant, has tried to give relatively accurate values of 10 fairy pieces: Hawk, Elephant, Unicorn, Fortress, Dragon, Spider, Leopard, Cannon, Archbishop, Chancellor. The method that led to these calculations has been based on computation, using a dedicated engine developed. Thousands of games were generated, which helped refine the values that served as a starting point (Musketeer Chess Pieces Relative Value). Other independent approaches have given Musketeer Chess a trial. For example, Sbiis Sabian, in a 24-page article, reviewed many existing methods and came-up with his own methodology, inspired from previous trials. He created a program that generates random chess positions, then calculated average mobility in thousands of positions approximating the relative piece values. Another progress has been the use of powerful engines: an approach presented by Grandmaster Larry Kaufman has allowed the evaluation of the relative piece values in many situations, e.g. the bishop pair.

== In Unicode ==
Many fairy piece symbols, including rotated pieces, equihoppers, and hybrids, are available in the Unicode block Chess Symbols.

== See also ==
- Fairy chess
- List of fairy chess pieces
- Chess variants
- Correspondence chess
- Movement of the orthodox pieces
- Orthodox piece names in different languages
- Penultima – a chess variant in which fairy pieces are invented for each game
- Three dimensional chess – multiple variants, including Raumschach mentioned above
