= Zebra (chess) =

Fairy chess piece

White zebra

Black zebra

Icons for the zebra used in diagrams

The zebra is a fairy chess piece that moves like a stretched knight. It jumps three squares horizontally and two squares vertically or three squares vertically and two squares horizontally, regardless of intervening pieces; thus, it is a (2,3)-leaper. A lame zebra, which moves one step orthogonally and then two steps diagonally outwards and can be blocked by intervening pieces, appears as the elephant in janggi.

== Movement ==
Position: b7 black circle, f7 black circle, a6 black circle, g6 black circle, d4 white zebra, a2 black circle, g2 black circle, b1 black circle, f1 black circle

The zebra may move to any of eight squares (black dots).

Position: a8 four, b8 three, c8 six, d8 one, e8 four, f8 five, g8 four, h8 one, a7 five, b7 four, c7 one, d7 four, e7 three, f7 four, g7 three, h7 six, a6 two, b6 three, c6 four, d6 three, e6 two, f6 five, g6 two, h6 three, a5 five, b5 two, c5 five, d5 four, e5 five, f5 white zebra, g5 five, h5 four, a4 two, b4 three, c4 four, d4 three, e4 two, f4 five, g4 two, h4 three, a3 five, b3 four, c3 one, d3 four, e3 three, f3 four, g3 three, h3 four, a2 four, b2 three, c2 six, d2 one, e2 four, f2 five, g2 four, h2 one, a1 five, b1 four, c1 three, d1 four, e1 three, f1 two, g1 three, h1 four

Distance from the f5-square, counted in zebra moves.

== Value ==
The zebra by itself is worth just below two pawns (appreciably less than a knight) due to its restricted freedom of movement on an 8×8 board. Its larger move is the main reason why it is weaker than a camel on an 8×8 board, even though the camel is colorbound and the zebra is not. A king, a bishop, and a zebra can force checkmate on a bare king; a king, a knight, and a zebra cannot; and a king, a camel, and a zebra cannot. The rook versus zebra endgame is a win for the rook. (All endgame statistics mentioned are for the 8×8 board.)

As a component of other pieces, the zebra has about the same value as the knight (both pieces can move to eight squares). Its long move carries the danger of causing unstoppable attacks in the opening and winning large amounts of material. Ralph Betza opined that the zebra's move was too large to be functional on an 8×8 board and that only on a 10×10 board or larger would it be worth its ideal value of about a knight.

== See also ==
- Camel (chess)
- Giraffe (chess)
