= List of fairy chess pieces =

A fairy chess piece is a game piece that is not in regular chess but appears in an alternate version of chess with different rules. Such an alternate version is known as a chess variant. In addition, fairy chess pieces are used in fairy chess, an area of chess problems involving changes to the rules of chess.

The following table shows some game pieces of unorthodox chess, from fairy chess problems and chess variants (including historical and regional ones), and the six orthodox chess pieces. The columns "BCPS", "Parlett" and "Betza" contain the notation describing how each piece moves. Italicised names are pieces that are found under other names elsewhere in the table. The notation systems are explained in this page.

0–9 – A – B – C – D – E – F – G – H – I – J – K – L – M – N – O – P – Q – R – S – T – U – V – W – X, Y, Z

Name	BCPS	Parlett	Betza	Found in	Notes
0–9
(1,1)-Zigzag Nightrider	S1			Fairy Chess problems	Takes Knight steps, in a general (1,1)-Bishop direction e.g. b1-a3-c2-b4-d3...
(2,0)-Zigzag Nightrider	S2			Fairy Chess problems	Takes Knight steps, in a general (2,0)-Rook direction e.g. b1-c3-d1-e3-f1...
(3,3)-Zigzag Nightrider	S3			Fairy Chess problems	Takes Knight steps, in a general (3,3)-Bishop direction e.g. b1-c3-e4-f6-h7
(4,0)-Zigzag Nightrider	S4			Fairy Chess problems	Takes Knight steps, in a general (4,0)-Rook direction e.g. b1-c3-b5-c7...
A
Aanca		1X.n+	t[FR]	Grant Acedrex (Alfonso X, 1283)	A word borrowed in medieval Spanish from Persian/Arabic legendary anqa, an elephant bird (a giant eagle preying elephants), see Gryphon. A name erroneously applied by some modern chess variant inventors to a piece moving t[WB] in Betza's notation and also called Manticore, creating confusion.
Abbot		4X, ~1/2	F4N	Typhoon chess, Scirocco chess	Moves as Knight or Bishop up to 4 squares
Ace		n✳, ~1/3	QC	Overkill Ecumenical Chess	Combination of Camel and Queen
Acropolis		~1/2, ~1/3, n+	RNC = RNL	Overkill Ecumenical Chess	Combination of Gnu and Rook.
Actor		~1/2, ~1/3,nX	BNC = BNL	Overkill Ecumenical Chess	Combination of Gnu and Bishop.
Actress		~1/2, ~1/3,n✳	QNC = QNL	Overkill Ecumenical Chess	Combination of Gnu and Queen.
Admiral		n+, 1X	RF	Sac Chess (Pacey, 2014), Large Chess Variants by Cazaux 2020, e.g., Terachess II	Combination of Rook and Ferz. Also known as Dragon King in Shogi, or Crowned Rook, or SuperRook in Pocket Mutation chess, or Sailor in Sac Chess (Pacey).
Advisor	FE	1X	F	Xiangqi (Chinese chess)	Ferz that cannot leave the palace (3×3 zone at the center of South and North sides). Originally 士 Shì (Black Advisor) and 仕 Shì (Red Advisor) in Chinese. Also known as Counsellor, Mandarin, Guard, Officer, Scholar and, ambiguously, Minister.
Alfil	AL	~2X (Alternate notation: ~2/2)	A = (2,2)	Chaturanga (Indian chess), Shatranj (Persian chess), Courier Chess, European Chess (before 1475)	Elephant in Shatranj. A (2,2)-leaper. Originally Fil in Persian. Also called Gaja, Hasty, Pil (Shatranj), Archer (Schütze) (Courier). Simply the move of the European Bishop before 1475. (The word alfil is the regular Bishop in Spanish.)
Alfilrider		n(~2X)	AA	Fairy Chess problems	A rider which moves any number of (2,2) cells (i.e., Alfil moves) in the same direction in a straight line. It is the Skip-bishop of problemists (G.P. Jelliss).
Alibaba		~2✳	AD	Fairy Chess problems	Combines the moves of Alfil and Dabbaba.
Alibabarider		n(~2✳)	AADD	Fairy Chess problems	Combination of Dabbabarider and Alfilrider. It is the Skip-queen of problemists (G.P. Jelliss).Compare Nightrider.
Amazon	AM	n✳, ~1/2	QN	Russian chess around 1770, Gustav III Chess (end of 18th c.), Kaiserspiel (1819), Pacific Chess (1971), Renn Chess (1980), Knightmare Chess, Musketeer Chess, Sac Chess (Pacey, 2014)	Combines the powers of Queen and Knight. Also called Angel (Autremont, 1918), Commander (Feldherr in original German Peguilhen, 1819; Trouillon, 1953), Wyvern (Parton, 1970s), Queen (Pacific Chess), Prince (Renn Chess), Superqueen, Dragon (Musketeer Chess).
Amazonrider	ET	n✳, n(~1/2)	QNN	Pocket Mutation Chess	Combination of Queen and Nightrider. Also called Queen of the Night. See also Elephant (von Wilpert).
Anchorite		1+.nX	t[WB]	Conclave Ecumenical chess	See Manticore.
Ancress		n+, 1+.nX	Rt[WB]	Conclave Ecumenical chess	Combination of Manticore and Rook.
Andernach Grasshopper				Andernach chess	A Grasshopper that changes the colour of the hurdle it leaps over.
Angry Boar	WE	1+	(0,1)	Dai shogi and other large shogi variant	Moves as a Wazir.
Antelope	AN	~ 3/4	(3,4)	Fairy Chess problems	Jumps three squares diagonally followed by one square orthogonally outwards.
Atlantosaur		c1✳	cWcF	Fairy Chess problems (J. de A. Almay, 1940)	Captures like a Mann (non-royal King) but never moves from his position unless to capture.
Anti-King		1✳ (captures friendly, not enemy pieces)	K (captures friendly, not enemy pieces)		This piece is in check when not attacked. If a player's Anti-King is in check and unable to move to a square attacked by the opponent, the player is checkmated. A King may not attack the opponent's Anti-King. The Anti-King may not check its own King.
Archbishop	PR	nX, ~1/2	BN	Carrera'chess (1617), Kaiserspiel (Peguilhen, 1819), Bird Chess (1874), Capablanca Chess, Janus Chess, Modern Chess (Vicente Maura), Grand Chess (Freeling), Cavalier Chess (Duniho, 1999), Quintessential Chess (Knappen), Seirawan Chess, Musketeer Chess (Haddad), Sac Chess (Pacey, 2014)	Combines the powers of Bishop and Knight. First named Centaur (Carrera), also called Princess (fairy chess), Adjutant (Peguilhen), Equerry (Bird), Cardinal, Minister (Vicente Maura's Modern Chess), Janus (Janus Chess), Paladin (Duniho), Hawk (Seirawan Chess).
Archbishop (Fox-Dawson)	AR	nX (bounce one edge)	B (bounce one edge)	Fairy Chess problems	Reflecting Bishop limited to a single bounce.
Archchancellor		n+, ~1/2, 1X	RNF	Teutonic Knight's Chess (J. Knappen, 2009)	Heroine, Superchancellor (Pocket Mutation Chess), Octopus (original German term Krake by German problemists) or Crowned Chancellor: Combination of Empress/Chancellor and Ferz. Originally Erzkanzler in German.
Archer		2X	FA	Reformed Courierspiel Chess variant	See Elephant (Modern).
Archer (Modern)	VA	onX, c~nX (over exactly one hurdle)	mBcpB	Bigorra	Moves like a Bishop when not capturing, but captures by leaping over an intervening piece and taking the piece on its destination square (the captured piece can be any number of squares beyond the hurdle). Also called Vao, Arrow, Crocodile.
Arrow (Duniho)	VA	onX, c~nX (over exactly one hurdle)	mBcpB	Yang Qi, Eurasian Chess (Duniho)	Moves like a Bishop when not capturing, but captures by leaping over an intervening piece and taking the piece on its destination square (the captured piece can be any number of squares beyond the hurdle). Also called Vao, Archer, Crocodile.
Arrow Pawn (Persson)		o2+, c1X	mW2cF	Arrow Pawn Chess (R. Persson variant, 1938)	Moves orthogonally one or two squares and captures diagonally one square.
Assassin		1✳, c2✳	WFcAcD	Stealth chess	a Man that can also capture as an Alfil or Dabbaba.
Astrologer		~1/3.nX	t[CB]=t[LB]	Tiger Chess (Zacharias)	Moves as a Camel followed by moving any number of spaces diagonally outwards like a Bishop.
Auroch		~1/2, ~1/4	N(1,4)	Fairy Chess problems	Combination of Knight and Giraffe (Pierre Monréal, 1975).
B
B4nD		4X, 1+.1+	B4nD	Chess with different armies (R. Betza, 1979)	Slides up to 4 squares as a Bishop or moves exactly 2 squares orthogonally (cannot leap the intermediate square)
Banshee		nX, n(1/2)	BNN	21st Century Chess (G. Jellis, 1991), Unicorn Chess (D. Paulowich 2000), Fearful Fairies (J. Knappen 2012)	Combines the powers of Bishop and Nightrider. Named Unicorn in Unicorn Chess, Cardinalrider (Pocket Mutation Chess, M. Nelson 2003) or Cardirider.
Barc		~2/1> (wide), ~1/2< (narrow)	fsNbbN	War of Worlds: Jupiter (R. Betza, ca. 1980)	Wide/Narrow-Hunter: moves forward as a wide Knight, and backward as a narrow Knight. The name is Crab spelled backwards.
Basilisk (Dragonchess)		o1✳>, c1✳>	mfFfbWcfK	Dragonchess (3D, 1985)	Bound to lower board. 3D movement: Can freeze any opposing piece on the cell directly above it automatically until the Basilisk moves away or is captured.
Bear	SQ	~0/2, ~1/2, ~2/2	NAD	Fairy Chess problems (N. Kovacs, 1937), Bear Chess (Mikhail Sosnovsky, 1985)	Jumps to any square a distance of 2. Also called Squirrel.
Bede		nX, ~2+	BD	Chess with different armies (R. Betza, 1979)	Combination of Bishop and Dabbaba.
Berolina Pawn	BP	o1X>, c1>, io2X>	mfFcefWimfnA	Berolina Chess (Nebermann, 1926)	Moves one square diagonally forward (except on its first move, when it may move two), but captures by moving one square straight forward. Also known as Berlin Pawn, Peasant (Faerie Chess) or Anti-Pawn. Cf. Pawn.
Berolina Plus Pawn		o1X>, c1>=, io2X>	mfFcfWcsWimfF2	Berolina Plus	Berolina Pawn which can also capture one step orthogonally to the side.
Biok		onX, cn+	mBcR	Enlarged & Improved Chess, Parton's Chess	Moves like a Bishop and captures like a Rook. First proposed in Holland in 1696 as an Ensign (or Fähnrich in German), then by V.R. Parton in Chess Curiouser & Curiouser (1961). See also Roshop.
Bion	BL		pB	Fairy Chess problems	Fairy chess Lion confined to diagonal lines. Also known as Bishlion and Bishop-lion-hopper.
Bishight		nX>, ~1/2<	fBbN	Chess with different armies (R. Betza, 1979)	Bishop/Knight-hunter: moves forward as a Bishop, and backward as a Knight.
Bishop	B	nX	B = FF	Grant Acedrex (Alfonso X, 1283), Courier Chess (12th c.), Orthodox chess	Moves any number of free squares diagonally. Also called Cocatriz (Grant Acedrex, medieval Spanish for cockatrice, representing a crocodile), Courier (Kurrier) (Courier chess), Kakugyo (angle-mover) in shogi, or Ferzrider.
Bishop's dog		3X	F3	Typhoon (A.King, 2009)	Moves and captures like a Bishop but limited to a maximum of 3 squares distance.
Bishopper	BH	^nX	gB	Fairy Chess problems	Grasshopper confined to diagonal lines. Also known as Bishop-hopper.
Bison	BI	~1/3, ~2/3	CZ = LJ	Fairy Chess problems, Herd (S. Sirotkin, 2000)	Combination of Camel and Zebra. Compare Falcon (Falcon Chess).
Blind Dog		1<=, 1X>	sbWfF	Wa shogi and Taikyoku shogi variants	Combination of Flying Cock and Backslider. Also known as Yen.
Blind Monkey		1=, 1X	FsW	Dai dai shogi and other large Shōgi variants	Also known as Drunken Ferz and Diabolo. The Blind Bear in Taikyoku shogi has the same moves.
Blind Tiger		1X, 1<=	FsbW	Chu shogi and other large Shōgi variants	Moves one square in any direction except orthogonally forward.
Boa			zNN	Fairy Chess problems	A Nightrider making an obtuse turn after every Knight's move. Discussed as Crooked Nightrider by Ralph Betza, but not used in a game . Combination of (3,3)-Zigzag-Nightrider and (4,0)-Zigzag-Nightrider. Its first two steps form a nice 8-pointed star on the chess board.
Boat	AL	~2X	A = (2,2)	Chaturaji (4 player Indian chess, 11th century)	See Alfil. Note that in Russia the Rook is called Ladya, a boat. The Rook is also a boat in traditional old Bengali and Javanese chess.
Bodyguard		2✳, (Hia power)	Q2 (Hia power)	Hiashatar (Mongolian decimal chess)	Moves like a Queen but only one or two squares. Special power: any sliding piece must stop if it moves within a King's move from the Bodyguard. Called Hia in Mongolian.
Boyscout	BT		zB	Fairy Chess problems	Moves like a bishop, but takes 90 degree turns after each step. Invented by J. de Almay in the years 1940s. Also called Crooked Bishop (Ralph Betza). Compare Girlscout.
Brontosaur		cnX	cB	Fairy Chess problems (J. de A. Almay, 1940), Megasaur Chess (Parton's Enduring Spirit of Dasapada)	Captures like a Bishop but never moves from his position unless to capture.
Buffalo		~1/2, ~1/3, ~2/3	NCZ = NLJ	Cavalry Chess (Frank Maus, 1921), Gigachess-Terachess (Cazaux, 2001)	Triple compound of Knight, Camel and Zebra.
C
Caliph		nX, ~ 1/3	BC = BL	Ecumenical Chess (Charles Gilman, 2003)	Combination of Bishop and Camel. Named Flying Dragon in Ganymede Chess by Mark Hedden (1999)
Caliph (Fairy)		1+, ~ 2X	WA	Fairy Chess problems	Problemist's name for the piece known as Phoenix in Shogi variants or Waffle in Chess with Different Armies
Camel	CA	~ 1/3	C = L = (1,3)	Tamerlane Chess (1336–1405), Wildebeest Chess, Mideast Chess, Renn Chess, Metamachy, Gigachess-Terachess	Old historic piece. Jumps 2 squares orthogonally followed by one square diagonally outwards. Also called Jamal (Persian for camel). Called Chevalier (Mideast Chess), General (Renn Chess), Sage (Devingt Chess) or Giraffe in Giraffe Chess.
Camelrider	CR	n(1/3)	CC = LL	Fairy Chess problems	A rider which moves any number the Camel's moves in the same direction. A piece in its path of the opposing color could be captured, but the Camelrider could not move any further. Also known as Mehari by French problemists.
Cannon	PA		mRcpR	Xiangqi, Shako (Chess) (1990), Metamachy (2012)	Compare with Korean Cannon, Originally 砲 Pào (Black Catapult) and 炮 Pào (Red Cannon)
Cannon (Korean)	RL	~n+ (over exactly one hurdle)	pR	Janggi (Korean chess), Fairy Chess problems	Moves and captures along orthogonal lines by jumping exactly one piece. There can be any number of free squares before and after the hurdle. Also called Rook-line-hopper, Rook Lion, or Rion by problemists.
Cannon (Musketeer)		1✳, ~2+, ~1/2 (narrow)	DWFsN	Musketeer Chess (Haddad, 2012)	Moves like a Mann, Dabbaba and limited Knight sideways.
Canvasser		n+, ~ 1/3	RC = RL	Ecumenical Chess (Charles Gilman, 2003)	Combination of Rook and Camel.
Capricorn				2000 A.D. (V. R. Parton 1970s)	Captures by charging (moving to a vacant square orthogonally or diagonally adjacent to) an enemy piece.
Cardinal	PR	nX, ~ 1/2	BN	Grand Chess (Freeling)	Combines the powers of Bishop and Knight. Also called Princess or Archbishop.
Carpenter		~ 2+, ~ 1/2	ND	Avon (C.Gilman)	Combination of Knight and Dabbaba. Also known as Templar (Jelliss), Doughnut (Betza), Ouroboros (Knappen), or Scribe (Joyce and Bagley-Jones). Name used in the Chess Variant Pages.
Castle	SQ	~ 0/2, ~ 1/2, ~ 2/2	NAD	Mideast Chess (California, 1971), Pacific Chess (Hawaii, 1971), Renn Chess (Greenwood, 1980)	Jumps to any square a distance of two. Also called Squirrel (Fairy Chess problems). Compare with the Centurion in Arch-Chess.
Cavalier		1X.n+, n+.1X	t[RF]t[FR]	Mideast Chess (California, 1971), Renn Chess (Greenwood, 1980)	Either one square diagonal followed by an orthogonal slide outwards or an orthogonal slide followed by one square diagonal outwards. More powerful than the Gryphon. (Note that a Cavalier is a Knight in French).
Centaur		~ 1/2, 1✳	KN	Fairy Chess problems, Courier-Spiel (Albers, 1821), Renn Chess (Greenwood, 1980), Reformed Courier-Spiel (Begnis, 2011), Sac Chess (Pacey, 2014), Infinite Chess (Naviary, 2023)	Combination of Knight and Mann. Also known as Crowned Knight, Counselor (Albers), Page (Greenwood), Paladin (Clément Begnis), Judge (Kevin Pacey).
Centaur (Carrera)	PR	nX, ~ 1/2	BN	Carrera's chess (1617), The Ouroboros King	Combines the powers of Bishop and Knight. Later on better known as Princess, Archbishop, Cardinal, and many other names.
Centurion		~ 0/2, ~ 1/2, ~ 2/2	NnAnD	Arciscacchiere (Archchess, Francesco Piacenza, 1683)	Despite an error often reported in English modern references, the Centurion cannot jump over an intermediate piece when jumping like Alfil or Dabbaba in Arciscacchiere. Compare with Squirrel.
Chameleon				Fairy Chess problems	Changes its powers, but not its color, on each move. Starts as a Knight on its first move, then plays as Bishop, then as Rook, then as Queen, then reverts as Knight and again always in this order.
Champion (Omega Chess)		1+, ~ 2✳	WAD	Omega Chess	Combines the powers of the Wazir and the Alibaba.
Champion (Begnis)		1✳, ~ 2+	WFD	Reformed Courier chess	Combines the powers of the Mann and the Dabbaba. Warrior as alternative name.
Champion (Carrera)	EM	n+, ~ 1/2	RN	Carrera's Chess (1617)	Combines the powers of the Rook and Knight. Also called Empress (fairy chess), Chancellor, Marshal (Freeling), or many other names.
Chancellor	EM	n+, ~ 1/2	RN	Carrera's Chess (1617), Sultanspiel (L. Tressan, 1840), Bird Chess (1874), Chancellor Chess (Ben Foster, 1887), Capablanca Chess (1920), Grand Chess (Freeling), Renn Chess (Greenwood, 1980), Seirawan Chess (2007), Musketeer Chess (Haddad, 2012), Etchessera (2017), Sac Chess (Pacey, 2014)	Combines the powers of the Rook and Knight. First named Champion (Carrera), later also called Empress (fairy chess), Guard (Bird), Marshal (Tressan, Freeling), Nobleman (Greenwood), or Elephant (Seirawan Chess).
Charging Knight		(~ 1/2)>, 1✳<	fhNsbK	Chess with different armies (R. Betza, 1979)	Moves forward as a Knight, or backwards and sideways as a King. Also known as Forfnibakking (from Betza notation fhNrlbK)
Charging Rook		n>=, 1✳<	fsRbK	Chess with different armies (R. Betza, 1979)	Moves as a Rook forwards and sideways, or as a King backwards. Also known as Furlrurlbakking (from Betza notation frlRrlbK)
Chariot	R	n+	R = WW	Chaturanga (Indian chess), Xiangqi (Chinese chess)	Moves as Rook. In Xiangqi originally 車 Jū (Black Chariot) and 俥 Jū (Red Chariot).
Checker Man		cn(^1X>), o1X>	mfF[cl]fF	American, Spanish and Italian Checkers	Moves forward one diagonal square without capturing, or captures by jumping diagonally over an opponent's piece. Promotes to Checker King after it reaches the far rank.
Checker Man		cn(^2✳>=), o1X>	mfF[cl]fF[cl]fsW	Old German (“Gothic”) Checkers	Moves forward one diagonal square without capturing, or captures by jumping in any direction forward or sideways over an opponent's piece. Promotes to Checker King after it reaches the far rank.
Checker Man		cn(^2✳), o1✳>	mfK[cl]K	Ossetian Checkers (Tama)	Moves forward one square without capturing, or captures by jumping in any direction over an opponent's piece.
Checker Man		cn(^2X), o1X>	mfF[cl]F	most other Checkers	Moves forward one diagonal square without capturing, or captures by jumping diagonally over an opponent's piece. Promotes to Checker King after it reaches the far rank (Russian man can promote mid-capture). Harzdame (Benedikt Rosenau, 2010) rotates this piece into mfrW[cl]W.
Checker Man		cn(^nX), o1X>	mfF[cl]B	Loca (Christian Freeling, 2020)	Moves forward one diagonal square without capturing, or captures by jumping any distance diagonally over an opponent's piece. Promotes to Checker King after it reaches the far rank.
Checker Man		cn(^2X^4+), o1X>	mfF[cl]F[cl]D	Frisian Checkers	Moves forward one diagonal square without capturing, or captures by jumping in any direction over an opponent's piece on the same color. Promotes to Checker King after it reaches the far rank.
Checker Man		cn(^2>=), o1>=	mfsW[cl]fsW	Greek and Turkish Checkers	Moves forward or sideways one square without capturing, or captures by jumping forward or sideways over an opponent's piece. Promotes to Checker King after it reaches the far rank. Ossetian Keny men can capture backwards. Corner Checkers rotates this to mfrbF[cl](frb)F
Checker Man		cn(^2>=), o1✳>	mfK[cl]fsW	Croda (Lubjan Dedić), Dameo (Christian Freeling, 2000)	Moves forward any direction one square without capturing, or captures by jumping orthogonally over an opponent's piece. Promotes to Checker King after it reaches the far rank.
Checker Man		cn(^2>=), o1✳>=	mfKmsW[cl]fsW	Armenian Checkers	Moves forward any direction or sideways one square without capturing, or captures by jumping orthogonally over an opponent's piece. Promotes to Checker King after it reaches the far rank.
Checker Man		cn(^2X), o1X	mF[cl]F	Sri Lankan Dām	Moves forward one diagonal square without capturing, or captures by jumping diagonally over an opponent's piece. Promotes to Checker King after it reaches the far rank.
Checker Man		cn(^2✳), o1✳	mK[cl]K	Alquerque	Checker at Alquerque that can move in any direction (but only along grid lines). Such a piece is also known as the marine King or poseidon
Checker King		cn(^2X), o1X	mF[cl]F	American and Italian Checkers	Promoted Checker at American and Italian Checkers that can move diagonally backward.
Checker King		cn(^2✳), o1✳ or cn(^n✳), on✳	mK[cl]K or mQ[cl]Q	Old German (“Gothic”) Checkers	Promoted Checker at Old German (“Gothic”) Checkers that can move in any direction and may be flying (it can move any distance). Such a piece is also known as the marine King or Queen or poseidon or mermaid.
Checker King		cn(^nX), onX	mB[cl]B	most other Checkers	Promoted Checker at International Draughts that is flying (it can move any distance). Such a piece is also known as the marine Bishop or nereide.
Checker King		cn(^nX), o1X	mF[cl]B	Loca (Christian Freeling, 2020)	Promoted Checker at Loca that can move diagonally backward.
Checker King		cn(^nX^2n+), onX	mB[cl]B[cl]DD	Frisian Checkers	Promoted Checker at Frisian Draughts that is flying (it can move any distance).
Checker King		cn(^n+), on+	mR[cl]R	Greek and Turkish Checkers, Harzdame (Benedikt Rosenau, 2010)	Promoted Checker at Greek and Turkish Checkers that is flying (it can move any distance). Such a piece is also known as the marine Rook or triton.
Checker King		cn(^n+), on✳	mQ[cl]R	Armenian Checkers	Promoted Checker at Armenian Checkers that is flying (it can move any distance).
Cheetah		~1/3, ~2/3, ~0/3, ~3/3	CZGH = LJGH	Modern Variants (Silverman, Cazaux)	Leaper combining Camel, Zebra, Threeleaper and Tripper. Named Titan in Fantasy Grand Chess (P. Hatch, 2000). Used in modern chessvariants played with AI AI.
Chicken General		1-4>, 1X<	fW4bF	Taikyoku shogi	Can move up to four steps forward or one step diagonally backward. The Pup General in Taikyoku shogi has the same moves.
Cleric (Dragonchess)				Dragonchess (3D, 1985)	See King. 3D movement: Can move or capture to the square directly above or below it.
Cloud Eagle		n<>, 1✳, 3X>	vRKfB3	Wa shogi and other large Shōgi variants	Combination of Flying Stag and a forward Bishop limited to 3 squares
Cockatrice	B	nX	B	Grant Acedrex (Alfonso X, 1283)	Moves any number of free squares diagonally. Cocatriz in medieval Spanish for cockatrice but it was represented as a crocodile in the medieval codex, moving like the orthodox Bishop.
Colonel		n>, n=, 2/1>, 1✳	KfsRfhN	Chess with different armies (R. Betza, 1979)	Combination of Charging Knight and Charging Rook: moves forward as Knight or Rook, sideways as Rook, or backwards as King.
Commoner	EK	1✳	WF	Chess with different armies (R. Betza, 1979)	See Guard or Mann
Commuter		~4X	(4,4)	Fairy Chess problems	Leaps four steps diagonally (Jelliss, Simple Chess Variants).
Congo Pawn		1✳>, o1< (past the river), o2< (past the river)	fWfF (fWfFmbR2 past the river)	Congo	Iron General that can also move (but not capture) one or two steps straight backward without jumping when past the river. It promotes to Congo Superpawn (on last rank).
Congo Superpawn		1✳>=, o1<, o2<, o1X<, o2X<	sfWfFmbQ2	Congo	Congo Pawn that can move and capture one step straight sideways, and move (but not capture) one or two steps straight or diagonally backward without jumping.
Coordinator				Ultima	Captures any opposing piece that is on either of the two squares found at a) the intersection of its own file and the King's rank, and b) the intersection of the King's file and its own rank.
Copper General		1✳>, 1<	fFvW	Chu shogi, Taikyoku shogi, Wa shogi, and other large Shōgi variants	Combination of Iron General and Backslider: moves one square in any direction forward or one square straight backward. Also known as Climbing Monkey, Flying Goose, or Yale.
Corporal		1X>, o1>, io2>	fFmfWimfnD		Improved Pawn that can also move without capture diagonally forward. Compare with Pawn and Sergeant.
Counsellor	FE	1X	F	Xiangqi (Chinese chess)	See Advisor, Ferz. Also spelled Councellor.
Courier	B	nX	B	Courier Chess (12th century), Courier-Spiel (1821), Reformed Courier-Spiel (Begnis, 2011)	Predecessor of the Bishop.
Crab		~ 1/2> (narrow), ~ 2/1< (wide)	ffNbsN	Chess with different armies (R. Betza, 1979)	Narrow/Wide Knight-Hunter: Moves forward as a Narrow Knight, and backward as a Wide Knight. Compare with Barc.
Crocodile (Congo)		1✳, n>; n=; n< (see notes)	fRbsWF or bRfsWF towards the river, sRvWF inside	Congo (1982)	It is a Mann (anywhere), a file-restricted Rook towards the river (outside the river), or a rank-restricted Rook (inside the river)
Crocodile (Modern)	VA	onX, c~nX (over exactly one hurdle)	mBcpB	Zanzibar Chess, Terachess	Moves like a Bishop when not capturing, but captures by leaping over an intervening piece and taking the piece on its destination square (the captured piece can be any number of squares beyond the hurdle). Also called Vao, Archer, Arrow.
Crowned Bishop		nX, 1+	BW	Shōgi, Quintessential Chess (Knappen, 2002), Sac Chess (Pacey, 2014), Heavy/Very Heavy Chess (Cazaux, 2020)	Combination of Bishop and Wazir. Also known as Dragon Horse in shogi and Quintessential Chess, and as Missionary (Kevin Pacey, Cazaux).
Crowned Rook		n+, 1X	RF	Shōgi, Shatar, The Duke of Rutland's Chess (J. Manners, 1747), Sac Chess (Pacey, 2014), Heavy/Very Heavy Chess (Cazaux, 2020)	Combination of Rook and Ferz. Also known as Dragon King in shogi, Bers or Baras in traditional shatar (Mongolian chess). Also Sailor (Kevin Pacey) or Admiral (Cazaux).
Crown Princess		nX, ~ 1/2, 1+	BNW	Teutonic Knight's Chess (J. Knappen, 2009)	Also known as Popess (Very Heavy Chess), Supercardinal (Pocket Mutation Chess). Combination of Princess/Archbishop and Wazir. Originally Kronprinzessin in German.
D
Dabbaba	DA	~ 2+	D = (0,2)	Chaturanga (Indian chess) (al-Adli, c. 840), Tamerlane Chess (1336–1405)	Old historic piece, also known as War Machine. The Arabic word dabbāba formerly meant a type of medieval siege engine, and nowadays means "army tank". Alternate notation: ~ 0/2
Dabbaba-checker			D[cl]W		A Dabbaba that can also capture an enemy piece by leaping over it. This piece can potentially capture 2 enemy pieces at a time, one by jumping over it and the other by landing on it.
Dabbabante		~ 0/2n	(0,2n)	Dabbabante Chess (V.R. Parton 1971)	A piece that can jump directly to any square a Dabbabarider can reach.
Dabbabarider		n(~2+)	DD	Fairy Chess problems	A rider which moves any number of (0,2) squares (i.e., Dabbaba moves) in the same direction. It is the Skip-rook of problemists (G.P. Jelliss).
Dayrider		o1✳, n(~2✳)	mKAADD	Typhoon (1999), Jupiter (1999)	An enhanced Alibabarider with additional non-capturing steps to free neighbouring squares thus removing the bindings of an Alibabarider. Invented by Adrian King (1999)
Debtor			vDsN	Knavish Chess (Charles Gilman, 2011)	A six-directional piece, moving sidewards as a Knight and forwards and backwards as a Dabbaba. Also see Knave.
Diplomat				Fairy Chess problems	Does not capture, cannot be captured, cannot move, but it saves from capture any adjacent piece to it. Other pieces can be granted diplomatic power.
Dinosaur		cn✳	cQ	Fairy Chess problems (J. de A. Almay, 1940), Megasaur Chess (Parton's Enduring Spirit of Dasapada)	Captures like a Queen but never moves from his position unless to capture.
Direwolf		~0/2, ~1/2, ~2/2, ~1/3, ~2/3, ~0/3, ~3/3	ANDHCZG=ANDHLJG	Bigorra (Cazaux)	Super-leaper combining Squirrel+Cheetah, that is to say Dabbaba, Knight, Alfil, Camel, Zebra, Threeleaper and Tripper. Formerly called Sabertooth.Comment on Fantasy Grand CHess XIII
Dog		1>, 1X<	fWbF	Taikyoku shogi, Tenjiku shogi, Wa shogi and other large Shōgi variants	Moves one square directly forward (as Wazir), or diagonally backward (as a Ferz). Also called Strutting Crow (Taikyoku shogi and Wa shogi), Swooping Owl, or Wazir/Ferz-Hunter.
Dolphin		3+, o~ 2+, o~ 3+	R3mDmH	Falconry (Russia, 1982)	Moves and captures 1, 2 or 3 squares like a limited Rook. It may leap over occupied squares but only when non capturing.
Donkey		1=, ~ 2<>	sWfbD	Maka dai dai shogi and other large Shōgi variants	Jumps 1 square sideways, or 2 squares forwards and backwards.
Dragon	DR	o1>, c1X>, io2>, ~ 1/2	NmfWcfFimfnD	Fairy Chess problems	Combination of Knight and Pawn.
Dragon (Dragonchess)				Dragonchess (3D, 1985)	See Dragon Horse (bound to upper board). 3D movement: Can capture remotely (without leaving level) one cell below it or like a Wazir pattern.
Dragon (5D)				5D Chess with Multiverse Time Travel (Thunkspace, 2020)	Analogue of Bishop in higher dimensions. Quadragonal movement: Any moves must incorporate all of the game's four axes equally, resulting in diagonal spatial dimension movements paired with diagonal temporal and timeline movements. Compare with Unicorn (5D).
Dragon Horse		nX, 1+	BW	Shōgi, Quintessential Chess (Knappen, 2002)	Combination of Bishop and Wazir. Also known as Crowned Bishop or a Missionary (Kevin Pacey, Cazaux).
Dragon King		n+, 1X	RF	Shōgi, Shatar, The Duke of Rutland's Chess (J. Manners, 1747),	Combination of Rook and Ferz. Also called Crowned Rook (Rutland), Sailor (Kevin Pacey) or Admiral (Cazaux). It is the Bers or Baras in traditional shatar (Mongolian chess).
Drunk Elephant		1X, 1>=	FsfW	Sho shogi, Chu shogi, Tori shogi, Wa shogi, and other large Shōgi variants	Moves one square in any adjacent direction except orthogonally backward. Called Falcon in Tori Shogi, or Roaming Boar in Wa shogi.
Drunken Soldier		1>=	sfW	Janggi (Korean chess), Xiangqi (Chinese chess)	Moves 1 square forward or sideways. Same as Korean Pawn in Janggi and promoted Pawn in Xiangqi (after crossing the river).
Duchess		1*, ~ 2/2, ~ 3/3, ~ 0/2, ~ 0/3	(1,1)(0,1)(2,2)(0,2)(3,3)(0,3) = KADGH = WFADGH	Modern Chess variants by Cazaux	Combination of the Mann, Alfil, Dabbaba, Tripper and Threeleaper.
Duck		o~n/n		Duck Chess (Dr. Tim Paulden, 2016)	Colorless piece, may jump to any space on the board, though cannot capture nor be captured.
Duke		1+.nX, nX.1+	t[BW]t[WB]	Renn Chess (Greenwood, 1980)	Either one square horizontal or vertical followed by a diagonal slide outwards or a diagonal slide followed by one square horizontal or vertical outwards. Compare with Manticore.
Duke (Jelliss)		1X, ~ 2+	FD	Fairy chess	Combination of Ferz and Dabbaba. Better known as Kirin (large shogis).
Duke (Musketeer chess)		1-2+, ~1/2	WDN	Musketeer chess: Castellum armies	Combination of War Machine and Knight. See Minister.
Dullahan		1X, ~ 1/2	FN	Fearful Fairies	Combination of Ferz and Knight. Known as Prince among problemists and named Priest in Scirocco. The name Dullahan was chosen as a male counterpart to Banshee.
Dummy	DU				A piece with no moves at all. It may gain temporarily moving ability by relay, or pushed or pulled by other specific pieces. It can be captured. Compare with Pyramid, and Zero.
Dwarf (Dragonchess)		o1>= c1X>	msfWcfF	Dragonchess (3D, 1985)	Pawn that can move without capture one cell laterally (no initial double step), 3D movement: Can capture to the cell directly above it.
E
Eagle		nX>, n<, 1✳, 2X<	fBbRWbB2	Tori shogi and other large Shōgi variants	Combination of Bishop/Rook-hunter (Falcon), Mann, and a backward Bishop restricted to 2 squares.
Eagle		1X.n+	t[FR]	Grant Acedrex (Alfonso X, 1283), Metamachy, Terachess	Moves one square diagonally followed by moving any number of spaces like a Rook outwards (moving away from where it started). See Gryphon.
Edgehog	EH	n✳ (edges)	Q (edges)	Edgehog Chess I (John Driver, 1966) & III (P. Aronson, 2001)	A queen that can move only to or from the edge of the board.
Edgehog (Limited)		n✳ (see notes)	Q (see notes)	Edgehog Chess II (John Driver, 1966) & III (P. Aronson, 2001)	Moves as a Queen, but if on an edge, must move to non-edge, and if on non-edge must move to edge.
Egg				The Ouroboros King	Doesn't Move, See Zero
Elemental (Dragonchess)				Dragonchess (3D, 1985)	Moves like non-leaping King+Dabbaba, captures like non-leaping Wazir+Dabbaba; on lower board. 3D movement: Can move or capture on any non-leaping Wazir pattern above or below.
Elephant (Chinese)		2X	nA	Xiangqi	A (2,2)-leaper but cannot jump over an intervening piece. In xianqi the Elephant is restricted to its half of the board. Originally 象 Xiàng (Black Elephant) and 相 Xiàng (Red Minister).
Elephant (Ciccolini)		~ 2/3	Z = J = (2,3)	Ciccolini's Chess (1820)	Named Giraffe (Grant Acedrex, 1283) or also Zebra by problemists.
Elephant (Indian)		1X, 1>	FfW	Indian chess (al Biruni, c. 1030), Dai shogi, Shōgi	See Silver General.
Elephant (Korean)		2/3	t[WnA]	Janggi (Korean chess)	Sang in Korean. Non-leaping Zebra.
Elephant (Modern)		1X, ~ 2X	FA	Alber's Courier-Spiel (1821), Shako (Chess) (1990), Reformed Courier Chess, Metamachy (2012)	Combination of Ferz (medieval Queen) and Alfil (medieval Bishop, shatranj Elephant). Also called Falafel (R. Betza), Ferfil (G.P. Jelliss), or Ferz Alfil. It is the Archer in Begnis's Reformed Courier-Spiel.
Elephant (Musketeer)		1✳, ~2+, ~2X	KAD = WFAD	Musketeer Chess (Haddad, 2012)	Moves like a Mann (Wazir + Ferz) or Dabbaba or Alfil. Also known as Mammoth, Mastodon, Squire, Pasha.
Elephant (Persian)	AL	~ 2X	A = (2,2)	Chaturanga (Indian chess), Shatranj (Persian chess), European Chess (before 1475)	(2,2)-leaper. See Alfil.
Elephant (von Wilpert)	ET	n✳, n~(1/2)	QNN	Wolf Chess (1943), Fairy Chess problems (Jean Oudot, 1975)	Combination of Queen and Nightrider, also called Amazonrider. Originally Elefant(en) in German.
Emperor		1+, ~ 1/2	WN	Fairy Chess problems (Jelliss)	Combination of Wazir and Knight. Also called Marquis.
Empress	EM	n+, ~ 1/2	RN	Carrera's Chess (Carrera, 1617), Tutti-Frutti Chess (Betza & Cohen), Wolf Chess (1943)	Combines the powers of the Rook and Knight. Also called Champion (Carrera's Chess), Chancellor, Concubine (The Duke of Rutland's Chess, J. Manners, 1747), Elephant (Seirawan Chess), Marshal, or Wolf (Wolf Chess).
Ensign		onX, cn+	mBcR	Enlarged & Improved Chess (1696)	Moves like a Bishop but captures like a Rook. Also named Biok.
Evil Wolf		1>=, 1X>	sfK	Dai shogi and other large Shōgi variants, Jetan (Burroughs' Martian chess)	Moves as a King but without any backwards movement. Also known as Pathan (Jetan Pawn), Pikeman, or Drunken Pawn.
F
FAD		1X, ~ 2✳	FAD	Chess with different armies (R. Betza, 1979)	Combines the powers of the Ferz and the Alibaba, also called Feralfda.
Falafel		1X, ~ 2X	FA	Betza's Chess	Combination of Ferz and Alfil. Also called Elephant (Modern).
Falcon		nX>, n<	fBbR	Falcon-Hunter Chess, Maka dai dai shogi, Tai shogi	Moves forward as a Bishop, and backward as a Rook. Also known as Bishop/Rook-Hunter, and Free Tile in Maka dai dai shogi and Tai shogi.
Falcon (Falcon Chess)		1/3, 2/3	nCnZ = nLnJ	Falcon Chess patent (George Duke, 1996)	A non-jumping Bison with multiple paths consisting of three straight or diagonal steps towards its endpoints. It can be blocked by two pieces and it can create a double pin.
Falcon (Falconry)		3X, ~ 1/3	CB3	Falconry (Russia, 1982)	Moves like a Camel (3,1) or 1,2,3 squares diagonally like a limited Bishop without jumping over occupied squares. It is a colorbound piece.
Faro	FA	o~n+ (over exactly one hurdle), cn+	cRmpR	Fairy Chess problems (M. Rittirsch, 2016)	Argentinian Rook, captures as a Rook but needs to jump over a hurdle for non-capturing moves, compare Cannon
Ferfil		1X, ~ 2X	FA	Fairy Chess Problems (Jelliss)	Combination of Ferz and Alfil. Also called Elephant (Modern).
Ferocious Leopard		1X, 1<>	FvW	Chu shogi and other large Shōgi variants	Moves one square in any adjacent direction except orthogonally sideways. Also known as Crane (Tori shogi) and Horrible Panther.
Ferz	FE	1X	F = (1,1)	Chaturanga, Shatranj, Tamerlane Chess (1336–1405), European Chess (before 1475), Archchess (Francesco Piacenza, 1683), Martian chess,	Moves one square diagonally in any direction. Usually spelled Fers by problemists, and Ferz in chess variants. Also called Cat Sword (Dai shogi), Decurion (Archchess), Martian Pawn (Martian Chess), Minister, Persian Queen. Simply the move of the Queen in Europe before 1475. (The word ferz, Ферзь, is the regular Queen in Russian.)
Fibnif		~ 1/2<>, 1X	fbNF	Chess with different armies (R. Betza, 1979)	Combination of narrow Knight and Ferz
Fiveleaper	BU	~5+, ~3/4	(0,5)(3,4)	Fairy Chess problems	Leaper that makes moves 5 units in length. Due to the Pythagorean theorem, it has twelve possible directions. Also named Root-25-Leaper.
Flamingo		~ 1/6	(1,6)	Fairy Chess problems	Makes a long (1,6) jump.
Flying Cock		1=, 1X>	sWfF	Wa shogi and Taikyoku shogi	Moves 1 square diagonally forward, or 1 square sideways. Also known as Sidewinder.
Flying Dragon		2X	B2	Dai shogi and other large Shōgi variants	A Bishop restricted to a distance of two squares.
Flying Dragon (Ganymede)		nX, ~ 1/3	BC = BL	Ganymede Chess	Combination of Bishop and Camel, better known as Caliph.
Flying Falcon		nX, 1>	BfW	Wa shogi and Taikyoku shogi	Bishop that can step one square forward.
Flying Horse		1+, 2X>	WnfA	Dai dai shogi and other large Shōgi variants	Combination of Wazir and Wood General.
Flying Kingfisher		n(2✳), 1✳	KAADD = WFAADD	Chess with different armies (R. Betza, 1979)	Combination of Alibabarider and Mann.
Flying Ox		nX, n<>	vRB	Chu shogi and other large Shōgi variants	Combination of Bishop and Reverse Chariot
Flying Stag		n<>, 1✳	vRK	Chu shogi and other large Shōgi variants	Combination of Reverse Chariot and Mann
Fool	WE	1+	W = (0,1)	Courier Chess (12th century)	Moves one square orthogonally in any direction (see Wazir). Also called Schleich, Jester, Joker, Spy, Smuggler, or Sneak.
Fool (Omega)				Omega Chess (1992)	Moves like the piece the opponent last moved.
Forequeen		n✳>=, ~ 1/2<, 1✳<	fsQbhNbK	Chess with different armies (R. Betza, 1979)	Moves as Queen forward or sideways, or as Mann or Knight backwards.
Forfer		1X, 1-4+	FR4	Chess with different armies (R. Betza, 1979)	Combination of Ferz and short Rook; or Dragon King (Ferz+Rook) limited up to 4 squares.
Fortress		1X, ~ 2+	FD	Pacific Chess (Hawaii, 1971)	Combination of Ferz and Dabbaba. Also known as Duke (Jelliss, Simple Chess Variants). Better known as Kirin (large shogis).
Fortress (Musketeer)		~2+, 1/2 (wide), 3X	F3DfbN	Musketeer Chess (Haddad, 2012)	Moves like a Bishop limited to 3 squares or narrow Knight or Dabbaba.
Fourleaper		~ 4+	(0,4)	Fairy Chess problems	Jumps four squares orthogonally, leaping over any intermediate piece (Jelliss, Simple Chess Variants).
Free Bear		nX, n=, 2X>	sRBfA	Dai dai shogi and other large Shōgi variants	Combination of Free Boar and forward-restricted Alfil.
Free Boar		nX, n=	sRB	Chu shogi and other large Shōgi variants	Combination of Bishop and Rook restricted to sideways directions.
Free Gold		n+, nX>	RfB	Maka dai dai shogi, Obento Chess (E.Silverman)	Combination of Rook and forward-only Bishop. Also known as Gold Rider (Silverman).
Free King	Q	n✳	Q = RB	Chu shogi, large shogis	Combines the powers of the Bishop and Rook. Called Honno in Chu shogi and other large shogis.
Free Silver		nX, n>	BfR	Maka dai dai shogi, Obento Chess (E.Silverman)	Combination of Bishop and forward-only Rook. Also known as Silver Rider (Silverman).
Friend	F			Fairy Chess problems	Moves like any friendly piece that is guarding it. Compare with Orphan.
Frog		1X, ~3+	FH	Fairy Chess problems	Combination of Ferz and Threeleaper. The simplest amphibian.
Fusilier		o1+, c1X	mWcF	Jeu de la Guerre (Prague, 1770), Centennial Chess (J.W.Brown, 1999)	Extended Pawn, moves one square orthogonally in all four directions, and captures diagonally in all four directions; also called a Quadrapawn, a Steward (Brown) or a Hobbit.
G
General (Chinese)		1+, "Flying General": cn> (against enemy General)	kW, "Flying General": cfR (against enemy General)	Xiangqi (Chinese chess)	Chinese King. Royal Wazir that cannot leave the palace (3×3 zone at the center of South and North sides), except for executing the Flying General move: a capturing forward Rook against the enemy General that is used to force checkmate. Originally 將 Jiàng (Black General) and 帥 shuài (Red General) in Chinese. Also called Governor in Xiangqi.
General (Chess.com)		~1/2, 1✳	KN	XXL chess etc. of Chess.com	Combination of Mann and Knight; same as Centaur
General (Ciccolini)		nX,n(~ 2+)	BDD	Ciccolini's Chess (1820)	Combine Bishop and Dabbabarider, a colorbound piece.
'General (Paulovits)		1✳, ~ 1/3	KC = KL = WFC	Paulovits's Game (1890)	Combination of non-royal King or Mann and Camel.
Giraffe (Modern)	GI	~ 1/4	(1,4)	Grant Acedrex (Alfonso X, 1283) according to H.J.R. Murray (1913)	Wrong historical interpretation but now a popular fairy piece. Compare with Giraffe (Zaraffa)
Giraffe (Zaraffa)	Z	~ 2/3	Z = J = (2,3)	Grant Acedrex (Alfonso X, 1283), Zanzibar, Terachess	Old historic piece. Jumps one square orthogonally followed by two squares diagonally outwards. Also called Zebra as fairy piece.
Giraffe (Zurafa)		~ 1/4.n+(outwards)	t[(1,4)R]	Tamerlane Chess (1336–1405)	Old historic piece. Starts with a (1,4) leap (like the modern Giraffe) and may continue moving outwards as a Rook.
Giraffe (Congo)		~ 2✳, o1✳	ADmK	Congo (1982)	Alibaba that moves but does not capture as a Mann. Compare with Pasha
Giraffe (Giraffe Chess)	CA	~ 1/3	C = L = (1,3)	Giraffe Chess	Old historic piece. Jumps 2 squares orthogonally followed by one square diagonally outwards. Mostly known as Camel but called Giraffe in Giraffe Chess, popular in India.
Girlscout	GT		zR	Fairy Chess problems, Jupiter (A. King 1999)	Moves like a Rook but takes a 90 degree bent after each step in a zig-zag manner. Also named Crooked Rook (R. Betza). Compare Boyscout.
Gliding Swallow	R	n+	R = WW		Compare Rook
Gnu	GN	~ 1/2, ~ 1/3	NC = NL	Wildebeest Chess (R.W. Schmittberger, 1987)	Combination of Knight and Camel. Called Wildebeest in Wildebeest Chess. Called Unicorn in Musketeer Chess. Invented by Walter Jacobs (Fairy Chess Review, 1934/8).
Gnurider	GR	n(~ 1/2), n(~ 1/3)	NNCC = NNLL	Fairy Chess problems	Combination of Nightrider and Camelrider
Go-Between		1<>	vW	Chu shogi, Dai shogi and other large Shōgi variants	Combination of Pawn (Japanese) and Backslider: moves one square forward or backward. Also known as Adjutant.
Go-between (Chinese)		on✳	mQ	Game of the Seven Kingdoms	Moves like a Queen, but cannot be captured nor capture. Also known as Jester (Brybelly).
Godzilla		1X.n+, 1+.nX	t[FR]t[WB]	Chessvariantpages (Derzhanski)	Double bent-rider. Combines Gryphon and Manticore.
Golden Bird			vRlrW2F3	Taikyoku shogi and other large Shōgi variants	Slides and jumps the first 3 squares along the forward diagonals.
Gold General		1+, 1X>	WfF	Shōgi, Taikyoku shogi, Wa shogi	Moves one square orthogonally, or one square diagonally forward. Also called Golden Bird or Violent Wolf (Taikyoku shogi and Wa shogi).
Goose		~ 2X>, ~ 2<	fAbD	Tori shogi	Alfil/Dabbaba-Hunter (moves forward as Alfil, backward as Dabbaba).
Gorilla		~ 1+, ~ 1X, ~ 1/3	FWC	Chexx chess	Combines the moves of Ferz, Wazir and Camel.
Grasshopper	G	^n✳	gQ	Fairy Chess problems	A hopper which moves along the same lines as Queen and lands on the square immediately beyond the hurdle, which can be of either color. It captures on its destination square. One of the most popular fairy pieces. Also known as Queen-hopper.
Graz Pawn		1✳>, io2✳>	fKimfnDimfnA	Fairy Chess problems	Combines the powers of the Berolina Pawn and the standard Pawn. It occurs (without the initial double move) as Iron General in large shogi variants from the 15th century, e.g., in Tenjiku shogi. Compare with Sergeant.
Great Horse		n<>, 2=, nX>	fBvRsW2	Taikyoku shogi	Moves as a forward Bishop, vertical Rook, or up to 2 squares sidewards. The Horseman in Taikyoku Shogi has the same moves.
Griffin (Dragonchess)				Dragonchess (3D, 1985)	See Zebra (on upper board). 3D movement: Can move or capture one jump along a space diagonal below or above.
Gryphon		1X.n+	t[FR]	Grant Acedrex (Alfonso X, 1283), Metamachy, The Ouroboros King	Originally Aanca in the ancient Castillan codex, a giant eagle mistaken for a Gryphon by Murray (1913). Moves one square diagonally followed by moving any number of spaces like a rook outwards (moving away from where it started). Also known as Eagle.
Guard	EK	1✳	WF (=K)	Courier Chess, Pacific Chess, Renn Chess, Waterloo Chess	Moves as King but is not royal. Also called Mann, Commoner, Prince, or Spy (Waterloo Chess).
Guard		on+, cnX	mRcB	Enlarged & Improved Chess (1696)	Moves like a Rook but captures like a Bishop. German name Trabant(en), also named Roshop.
Guard (Etchessera)				Etchessera	When the King moves, the Guard follows the King by moving to its last occupied square. The Guard otherwise cannot move.
H
Half-Duck		1X, ~ 2+, ~ 3+	HFD	Chess with different armies (R. Betza, 1979)	Combination of Kirin and Threeleaper.
Hare		~ 2/4	(2,4)	Fairy chess problems	Jumps two squares diagonally followed by two squares orthogonally outwards. Also known as Stag or Lancer. Original name Hase in German.
Harvester		nX, 1+.nX	Bt[WB]	Tripunch Chess (Betza, 2002)	Combination of Bishop and Manticore. Compare with Reaper.
Hawk		~ 2/2, ~ 3/3, ~ 0/2, ~ 0/3	(2,2)(0,2)(3,3)(0,3) = ADGH	Musketeer Chess, Infinite Chess (Naviary, 2023)	Jumps two or three squares in any orthogonal or diagonal direction.
Heavenly Horse			ffbbN	Wa shogi	Occurs in Taikyoku shogi with a different move.
Heavenly Tetrarch		4✳	Q4	Taikyoku shogi	Move as Queen limited to 4 steps
Hero (Dragonchess)				Dragonchess (3D, 1985)	See Elephant (Modern) (on middle board). 3D movement: Can move or capture one cell along a space diagonal below or above.
Heroine		n+, ~ 1/2, 1X	RNF	Pocket Mutation Chess (Nelson, 2003), Teutonic Knight's Chess (Knappen, 2009), K. Pacey (2019), Very Heavy Chess (Cazaux, 2020)	Combination of Empress/Chancellor and Ferz. Also known as Superchancellor (Nelson), Archchancellor (Knappen), Ship (Pacey).
Hia		2✳ (Hia power)	Q2 (Hia power)	Hiashatar (Mongolian decimal chess)	Mongolian Bodyguard (see).
High Priestess		1X, ~ 2X, ~ 1/2	FAN	Two large Shatranj variants (J.Joyce 2005)	Combines the powers of Ferz, Alfil, and Knight. Also known as Leopard.
Hippopotamus		c~ 1/2	cN	Fairy Chess problems (J. de A. Almay, 1940), Megasaur Chess (Parton's Enduring Spirit of Dasapada)	Captures like a Knight but never moves from his position unless to capture. Also called Hipposaur (Parton).
Hobbit		o1+, c1X	mWcF	Jeu de la Guerre (Prague, 1770), Hobbit Chess (2002)	Moves one square orthogonally in all four directions, and captures diagonally in all four directions; originally called a Fusilier (1770).
Horned Falcon		nX, n<=, 1>, ~ 2>	BsbRfWfD or BrlbRdhfWfD	Chu shogi and other large Shōgi variants	Moves as a Bishop, as a Rook except forward), or as a Lion (Japanese) up to 2 squares orthogonally forward.
Horse	MA	1/2	t[WF]	Xiangqi (Chinese chess)	See Mao. Originally 馬 Mǎ (Black Horse) and 傌 Mà (Red Horse) in Chinese.
Hospitaller		~ 1/2, ~ 2X	NA	Fairy Chess problems (Jelliss)	Combination of Knight and Alfil. Also known as Kangaroo or Priestess (Joyce and Bagley-Jones)
Howling Dog		n>, 1<	fRbW	Dai dai shogi and other large Shōgi variants	Combination of Lance and Backslider.
Hunter		n>, nX<	fRbB	Spanish Chess (1739), Falcon-Hunter Chess	Moves forward as Rook, and backward as Bishop. First proposed in Spanish Chess (Germany,1739), as Archer. Also known as Rook/Bishop-Hunter, and Multi General in Tenjiku shogi and Taikyoku shogi.
Huygens				Infinite Chess (Naviary, 2023)	Like the Rook, But it jumps to the squares with a prime distance from its position
I
Ibis		~ 1/5	(1,5)	Fairy Chess problems	Jumps 4 squares orthogonally followed by one square diagonally outwards.
Imitator				Ultima	Colorless piece; cannot capture; moves only in dependence of other pieces – its move being simultaneous to every piece's move, parallel and of same length and direction. If a line piece's move is imitated, the imitator's path must not be blocked. Neither can the imitator be moved outside the board. If complete imitation is not possible, the respective move is illegal.
Immobilizer		on✳ (Immo1✳)	mQ (Immo-K)	Ultima	Moves as Queen; any enemy piece that is adjacent to the immobilizer is frozen and cannot move until the immobilizer moves away or is captured. If two immobilizers are next to each other, they are both frozen until the end of the game or one is captured. Also known as Freezer.
Impala		~ 1/2, ~ 3/4	N(3,4)	Fairy Chess problems	Combination of Knight and Antelope.
Iron General		1✳>	fK	Dai shogi, Tenjiku shogi, other Shōgi variants.	Moves one square in any direction forward. Also called Forward King.
J
Jester (Brybelly)		on✳	mQ	Faerie Chess	Moves as Queen, but can't capture, nor be captured. Also Known as Go-between (Chinese).
Joker		1✳, ~ 2✳, ~ 1/2	KAND = WFAND	Waterloo Chess, Amsterdam Medieval Chess	Identical to the KAND Lion
Judge		~ 1/2, 1✳	KN	Sac Chess (Pacey, 2014)	Combination of Knight and Mann. Also known as Centaur.
K
Kangaroo		~ 1/2, ~ 2X	NA	Outback Chess (T. Newton 2002)	Combination of Knight and Alfil. Also known as Hospitaller or Priestess.
Khon		1X, 1>	FfW	Indian chess (Biruni, c. 1030), Makruk (Thai chess), Shōgi, Sittuyin (Burmese chess), Taikyoku shogi, Wa shogi	Combination of Ferz and Soldier: moves one square in any direction diagonally or one square straight forward. Also called Burmese Elephant, Hsin in sittuyin (Burmese chess), Elephant in some versions of Indian chess, Silver General in shogi, and Violent Stag in taikyoku shogi and wa shogi.
King	K	1✳	K = WF	Orthodox chess, Chaturanga, Shatranj, Shōgi, Tamerlane Chess, Tori shogi	Moves one square in any direction. (Combination of Wazir and Ferz). Royal in orthodox chess. Also called Raja (chaturanga), Shah (shatranj), Jeweled General (shōgi), or Phoenix (tori shōgi). For a non-royal piece which moves like the King, see Mann, Commoner or Guard.
King (Dragonchess)				Dragonchess (3D, 1985)	King (on middle board) with a 3D movement: can move or capture to the cell directly above or below it.
Kirin		1X, ~ 2+	FD	Chu shogi, Dai shogi and other Shōgi variants, Pacific Chess (Hawaii, 1971)	Combination of Ferz and Dabbaba. Also called Diamond (for its pattern), Fortress (Pacific Chess), Duke (Jelliss, Simple Chess Variants).
Knave		~2=, ~1\2<>	sDffbbN	Knavish Chess (Charles Gilman, 2011)	A six-directional piece, moving sidewards as a Dabbaba and forwards and backwards as a Knight. Also see Debtor.
Kneen		o~ 1/2, cn✳	mNcQ	Parton's Chess	Moves like a Knight and captures like a Queen. First proposed by V.R. Parton in Chess Curiouser & Curiouser (1961). See also Quight.
Knight	S	~ 1/2	N = (1,2)	Chaturanga, Orthodox chess, Shatranj, Tamerlane Chess	Jumps one square orthogonally followed by another square diagonally. Called Ashwa (horse) in Chaturanga, Faras (horse) in Shatranj, or Zebra in Congo.
Knight (Japanese)		(~ 1/2)> (narrow)	ffN	Shōgi (Japanese chess)	Narrow Knight restricted to forward movements.
Knishop		~ 1/2>, nX<	fNbB	Chess with different armies (R. Betza, 1979)	Knight/Bishop-hunter: moves forward as a Knight and backward as a Bishop.
L
Lance		n>	fR	Shōgi, Chu shogi, Taikyoku shogi, Wa shogi	Moves any number of squares directly forward. Also called Forward Rook (checkers chess), and Oxcart (Taikyoku shogi, Wa shogi).
Lancer		~ 2/4	(2,4)	Fairy Chess problems	Jumps two squares diagonally followed by two squares orthogonally outwards. Also known as Stag or Hare (original German name Hase) by problemists.
Leeloo				Quintessential Chess (J. Knappen, 2002)	Combines the powers of Quintessence and Rook
Left General		1X, 1<>, 1= (only right)	FvrW	Dai dai shogi and other large Shōgi variants	Asymmetrical combination of Ferocious Leopard and right Wazir.
Left Quail		n>, nX< (right diagonal), 1X	fRbrBblF	Tori shogi and other large Shōgi variants	Combination of Lance, Ferz and a backward Bishop restricted to right side.
Leo	LE		mQcpQ	Dawson (<1914), Akenhead's Chess (1947)	Combines the powers of Pao (Cannon) and Vao (Crocodile). Moves like a Queen when not capturing, but captures by leaping over an intervening piece and taking the piece on the Leo's destination square (the captured piece can be any number of squares beyond the hurdle). Also called Lion (Caïssa Britannia, F.Duniho, 2003), Tank (Ch.Gilman, 2003), Sorceress (Cazaux's variants).
Leon		~ 1/3, ~ 3+	CH = LH	Grant Acedrex (Alfonso X, 1283)	Spanish Lion. Combination of Camel and Threeleaper.
Leopard (Musketeer)		~ 1/2, 2X	NB2	Musketeer Chess (Haddad, 2012)	Moves like a Knight or a Bishop limited to a maximum of 2 squares.
Liberated Horse		n>, 2<	fRbR2	Wa shogi	Moves forward as a Rook or one or two squares orthogonally backward.
Lion (Congo)		1✳, c(n✳>) (against enemy Congo lion)		Congo (1982)	King that may not leave its 3×3 castle except to capture another Lion on the same vertical or diagonal line.
Lion (Fairy)	LI		pQ	Fairy Chess problems	A hopper which moves along the same lines as a Queen and which can land on a square any distance beyond the hurdle. Also known as Queen-line-hopper.
Lion (Japanese)		1✳, ~ 2✳, ~ (1/2)	KANDcaKmabK	Chu shogi, Dai shogi and other large Shōgi variants	Move 2 steps or jumps per turn in any adjacent direction. It can capture up to two pieces per turn, capture an adjacent piece without moving (stationary feeding), or move and return (effectively passing a turn).
Lion (Modern)		1✳, ~ 2✳, ~ 1/2	KAND = WFAND	Metamachy, Terachess, Scirocco	A KAND Lion is moving and capturing anywhere one or two squares around, i.e. one or two squares in any direction or like a Knight. Also known as Lioness (Scirocco), Joker.
Lion (Murray)		~ 2✳, c1✳	ADcK	Chess variants	Can move and capture as an Alfil or Dabbaba, and capture only as a King. This piece stems from a misinterpretation of the Lion of Chu shogi. It is named after the chess historian H.J.R. Murray, 1913 who brought it up.
Lion Dog		3✳	Q3	Dai dai shogi and other large Shōgi variants	A Queen that cannot move more than three squares. Can jump and locust-capture in Japanese rule interpretation.
Llama		o1>, c1X>, io2>, ~ 1/3	CmfWcfFimfW2	Fairy Chess problems	Combination of Camel and Pawn. Invented by Pierre Monréal and Jean-Pierre Boyer (1965). Also spelled Lama by problemists.
Loco	LO	cnX, o^nX	cBmpB	Fairy Chess problems (M. Rittirsch, 2016)	Argentinian Bishop, captures as a Bishop and needs a hurdle to move without capturing, compare Faro
Locust	L	c^n✳, on✳	mQ[cl]Q	Fairy Chess problems	Moves as a Queen but must hop over an adverse piece to the square next beyond that piece to capture that piece in the move.
M
Machine		~ 1−2+ = 1+, ~ 2+	WD	Terachess, Zanzibar Chess	Combination of Wazir and Dabbaba. See War Machine.
Mage (Dragonchess)				Dragonchess (3D, 1985)	Queen (on middle board), Wazir (on upper or lower boards). 3D movement: can move or capture one or two cells above or below it.
Maharaja		n✳, ~ 1/2	QN	Maharajah and the Sepoys	A royal Amazon, the only piece for White side.
Mammoth		cn+	cR	Fairy Chess problems (J. de A. Almay, 1940)	Captures like a Rook but never moves from his position unless to capture.
Mammoth (Winther)		1✳, ~ 2✳	KAD = WFAD	Mastodon Chess and Mammoth Chess (M. Winther, 2006)	Combination of Mann (non-royal King), Alfil and Dabbaba. Also known as Pasha (Paulovits), Mastodon or Squire (Renn Chess).
Mann	EK	1✳	WF = K	Courier Chess (12th century), Courier-Spiel (1820)	Moves as King but is not royal. From German Mann or Ratgeber. Also called Sage, Fool, Commoner, Guard, Erlking, Common King or spelled as Man.
Manticore		1+.nX	t[WB]	Modern chess variants (Betza, Gilman, Cazaux, King, Muller)	Moves as a Wazir and continues as a bishop outwards. Also called Aanca (R. Betza), Acromantula (H. G. Muller), Anchorite (C. Gilman), Rhinoceros (Cazaux), Spider (A. King), or Unicorn. Compare with Gryphon and Duke.
Mao	MA	1/2	nN	Xiangqi (Chinese chess), Akenhead's Chess (1947).	Chinese Horse. Moves like a Knight except that it does not leap. It steps one square orthogonally in any direction, then continues one square diagonally in the same general direction. The square stepped to orthogonally must be vacant.
Marquis		1+, ~ 1/2	WN	Scirocco (A.King), Opulent Chess (G.Strong), Obento Chess (E.Silverman)	Combination of Wazir and Knight. Also called Emperor (Jelliss, Simple Chess Variants).
Marshal	EM	n+, ~ 1/2	RN	Grand Chess (Freeling)	Also spelled Marshall, or called Chancellor or Empress.
Mastodon		1✳, ~ 2✳	KAD = WFAD	Mastodon Chess and Mammoth Chess (M. Winther, 2006)	Combination of Mann (non-royal King), Alfil and Dabbaba. Also known as Pasha(Paulovits), Mammoth or Squire (Renn Chess).
Megasaur		cn✳, c~ 1/2	cQcN	Fairy Chess problems, Megasaur Chess (Parton's Enduring Spirit of Dasapada)	Combine the Dinosaur and the Hipposaur, i.e. captures like an Amazon but never moves from his position unless to capture.
Mehari	CR	n(1/3)	CC = LL	Fairy Chess problems	A rider which moves any number the Camel's moves in the same direction. Also known as Camelrider, Mehari was the name given by problemist (A mehari is a mounted dromedary).
Metropolitan		nX, 1X.n+	Bt[FR]	Conclave Ecumenical chess	Combination of Gryphon and Bishop.
Minister		1+, ~ 2+, ~ 1/2	WDN	Two large Shatranj variants (J. Joyce 2005)	Combines the powers of Wazir, Dabbaba, and Knight.
Minister (Shatranj)	FE	1X	F = (1,1)	Chaturanga, Shatranj, Tamerlane Chess (1336–1405)	See Ferz. Also known as Counsellor.
Minister (G.Vicente Maura)	PR	nX, ~ 1/2	BN	Modern chess (Vicente Maura)	Combines the powers of Bishop and Knight. Also called Princess or Archbishop.
Missionary		nX, 1+	BW	Sac Chess (Pacey, 2014), Very Heavy Chess (Cazaux, 2020)	Combination of Bishop and Wazir. Also known as Dragon Horse in Shogi, or Crowned Bishop.
Moa	MO	1/2	nN	Chinese	Similar to Mao, but the first step is diagonal and the second orthogonal, not the other way round.
Monkey (Congo)		o1✳, cn(^2✳)		Congo (1982)	Checker King allowed to play orthogonally too.
Mounted King		1✳, ~ 1/2		The Ouroboros King	Moves like Centaur, but it's a royal piece.
N
N2R4		2(~ 1/2), 1−4+	N2R4	Chess with different armies (R. Betza, 1979)	
Nao	NA	c^n(~1/2), on(~1/2)	mNNcpNN	Chinese	A Chinese Nightrider. Moves as a Nightrider when not capturing, captures by leaping over a piece and capturing the piece on its destination.
Newt		~2X, ~3+	AH	Fairy Chess problems	Combination of Alfil and Threeleaper. A simple amphibian.
Nightrider	N	n(1/2)	NN	Wolf Chess (1943), Edgehog Chess II (John Driver, 1966) & III (P. Aronson), Cavalier Chess (Fergus Duniho, 1998)	A rider which moves any number the Knight's moves in the same direction. A piece in its path of the opposing color could be captured, but the Nightrider could not move any further. Also played in Fairy Chess problems (T.R. Dawson).
Nightriderhopper	NH	^n(~1/2)	gNN	Fairy Chess problems	Move to next square beyond any piece in lines of knight moves. Also known as Knight-line-hopper
O
Okapi	OK	~ 1/2, ~ 2/3	NZ = NJ	Fairy Chess problems	Combination of Knight and Zebra. Invented by Pierre Monréal (1965).
Old Monkey		1X, 1<	FbW	Maka dai dai shogi and other large Shōgi variants	Combination of Ferz and Backslider. Also known as Inverted Silver and Backward Elephant.
Orphan	O			Fairy Chess problems	Moves like any enemy piece that is attacking it. Compare with Friend.
Osprey		2+.nX	t[DB]	Expanded Chess (D.Zacharias, 2017)	Leaps to the second square on the same rank or file, and then slides outward as a Bishop. Compare with Manticore.
Ostrich		2X.n+	t[AR]	Fairy chess	Leaps to the second square diagonally, and then slides outward as a Rook. Counterpart of the Osprey.
P
Paladin (Dragonchess)				Dragonchess (3D, 1985)	Centaur (on middle board) or King (on upper or lower boards). 3D movement: Makes knight-like jumps
Paladin		~ 1/2, 1✳	KN	Reformed Courier-Spiel (Begnis, 2011)	Combination of Knight and Mann. Better known as Centaur.
Paladin	PR	nX, ~ 1/2	BN	Cavalier Chess (Fergus Duniho, 1999),	Combines the powers of Bishop and Knight. Better known as Princess (fairy chess), Archbishop or Cardinal. Proposed name by several chessvariant fans as it reflects the nature of this piece (Duniho).
Pancake		1✳, ^n(~1/2)	pNNK	Chess with different armies (R. Betza, 1979)	Combination of Mann and cannon-style Nightrider
Pao	PA	on+, c~n+ (over exactly one hurdle)	mRcpR	Akenhead's Chess (1947), Xiangqi (Chinese chess)	Chinese Cannon. Moves like a Rook when not capturing, but captures by leaping over an intervening piece and taking the piece on the Pao's destination square. Compare with Cannon (Korean).
Pasha		1✳, ~ 2✳	KAD = WFAD	Paulovits's Game (1890), Renniassance Chess (1980), Mastodon Chess (2006)	Combination of non-royal King or Mann (Wazir+Ferz) and Alibaba (Alfil+Dabbaba). Also known as Mastodon, Mammoth, Squire (Renn Chess).
Pawn	P	o1>, c1X>, io2>	mfWcefFimfnD	Orthodox chess, Chadarangam (Telugu chess) and many other chess variants	Moves one square straight forward (except on its first move, when it may move two squares), but captures one square diagonally forward. Compare with Berolina Pawn and Torpedo Pawn.
Pawn (Chinese)	CP	1>; 1>, 1+= (after crossing the river)	fW; fsW (after crossing the river)	Xiangqi (Chinese chess)	Originally Zú (Black Private (Mercenary)) and Bīng (Red Soldier) in Chinese. Moves one square orthogonally forward (like Japanese Pawn) before crossing the river, and one square orthogonally forward or sideward (like Korean Pawn) after crossing the river.
Pawn (Japanese)		1>	fW	Shōgi, Chu shogi, Tori shogi, Wa shogi, Out-Khmer (Hills' Cambodian chess), Xiangqi (Chinese chess)	Moves one square orthogonally forward. It is the Pawn from Xiangqi (Chinese chess), before crossing the river and the Pawn in Shōgi (Japanese chess). Also called Soldier, Fish (Shattrong), Sparrow Pawn (Wa shogi), or Swallow (Tori shogi).
Pawn (Jetan)		1>=, 1X>	sfK	Dai shogi and other large Shōgi variants, Jetan (Burroughs' Martian chess)	Moves as a King but without any backwards movement. Also known as Evil Wolf, Pikeman, or Drunken Pawn.
Pawn (Korean)		1>=	sfW	Janggi (Korean chess), Xiangqi (Chinese chess)	Moves one square orthogonally forward or sideward. It is the Pawn from Xiangqi (Chinese chess), after crossing the river and the Pawn from Janggi (Korean chess). Also called Soldier.
Pawn (Shatranj) Pawn of piece(s)		o1>, c1X>	mfWcfF	Shatranj (Persian and Arabic chess), Chaturanga (medieval Indian chess), Makruk (Thai chess), Shatar (Mongolian chess), Tamerlane Chess (1336–1405), Full Tamerlane Chess (al-Âmulî & Arabshâh, 14th–15th centuries)	Baidaq (Persian/Arabic Pawn). Orthodox Pawn without double step on first move. It is the same Pawn from Chaturaji (4-player Indian chess), Ouk Chatrang (Cambodian chess), and Senterej (Ethiopian chess). Also called Padati (pawns or soldiers) in some Indian texts. Tamerlane Chess and Full Tamerlane Chess have Pawns that promotes to a certain piece. Examples: Pawn of Dabbabas, Pawn of Elephants, Pawn of Minister (Ferz), Pawn of Shah (King), Pawn of Vizir (Wazir), Pawn of Vanguards (Bishops), Pawn of Knights, Pawn of Rukhs (Rooks). A Pawn of Pawn promotes to Pawn of King.
Pawn (Hiashatar)		o1>, c1X>, io3>	mfWcfFimfW3	Hiashatar (Mongolian decimal chess)	Orthodox Pawn with a triple step on first move. Mongolian Küü.
Pawn (Torpedo)		o1>, o2>, c1X>	mfW2cefF	Torpedo Chess, Metamachy, Gigachess, Terachess	Moves two square straight forward, but captures one square diagonally forward. Can capture a Torpedo Pawn en passant if the other Torpedo Pawn moves two squares forwards to the immediate square left or right of the Torpedo Pawn. Simply called Pawn in many chess variants.
Pegasus			NNgQ	Fairy Chess problems	Combines the powers of the Grasshopper and of the Nightrider.
Pegasus (Beastmaster)		~ 1/4 ~ 2/3	Z(1,4) = J(1,4)	Beastmaster Chess (G. Overby, 2002)	Combination of Giraffe and Zebra
Pegasus (Zacharias)		~ 1/2.n+	t[NR]	Tiger Chess (Zacharias)	Moves as a Knight followed by moving any number of spaces outwards like a Rook. Compare with Gryphon.
Pheasant		~ 2>, 1X<	fDbF	Tori shogi and other large Shōgi variants	Dabbaba/Ferz-Hunter (moves forward as Dabbaba, and backward as Ferz).
Phoenix		1+, ~ 2X	WA	Chess with different armies, Chu shogi, Dai shogi, and other Shōgi variants	Combination of Wazir and Alfil. Also known as Waffle.
Popess		nX, ~ 1/2, 1+	BNW	Pocket Mutation Chess (Nelson, 2003), Teutonic Knight's Chess (Knappen, 2009), K.Pacey (2019), Very Heavy Chess (Cazaux, 2020)	Combination of Princess/Archbishop and Wazir. Also known as Crown Princess, Freemason (Pacey), or Supercardinal (Nelson).
Priest		1X, ~ 1/2	FN	Scirocco (A.King)	Combination of Ferz and Knight. Known as Prince among problemists and named Dullahan in Fearful Fairies by J. Knappen-
Priestess		~ 1/2, ~ 2X	NA	Short Range Project (Joyce and Bagley-Jones 2006)	Combination of Knight and Alfil. Also known as Hospitaller or Kangaroo
Prince		1✳	WF = K	Tamerlane chess, Chu shogi, large shogis	A non-royal King or Mann, promoted from a Pawn of King. Originally Shâhzâda in Persian. Also known as Adventice King (Shâh masnû‘a) when promoting from Pawn of Pawns. Called Taishi, promoted Drunk Elephant in Chu shogi.
Prince (The Ouroboros King)		1✳	WF = K	The Ouroboros King	Mann that can make inmortal any royal pieces if they are being 3 or less squares away vertically and horizontally from the Prince.
Prince (Fairy)		1X, ~ 1/2	FN	Fairy Chess problems (Jelliss, Simple Chess Variants)	Combination of Ferz and Knight. Also known as Priest (Scirocco) or Dullahan (Fearful Fairies).
Prince (Modern)		1✳, o2>	WFmfW2	Metamachy	Moves as a Mann (non-royal King) or as a Pawn, can be promoted like a Pawn.
Prince Elephant (Betza)		1✳, ~ 2X	WFA	Chess on a really big board	Combines the powers of the Mann and the Alfil. War Elephant as alternative name.
Princess	PR	nX, ~ 1/2	BN	Kaiserspiel (Peguilhen, 1819), Grand Chess (1984), Tutti-Frutti Chess (Betza & Cohen), Wolf Chess (1943)	Combines the powers of Bishop and Knight. Also called Archbishop, Cardinal, Janus, Paladin, or Centaur (Carrera's Chess, Pietro Carrera, 1617). Called Adjutant in Kaiserspiel, Fox in Wolf Chess (Originally Fuchs in German), and Minister in Modern Chess (Gabriel Vicente Maura's, 1968).
Princess (5D)				5D Chess with Multiverse Time Travel (Thunkspace, 2020)	Moves like a Queen but is restricted to using only a maximum of two of the game's four playable axes, whereas a Queen may use as many of the axes as desired.
Princess (CEO)		2✳	W2F2 = Q2	Chess Evolved Online (Joseph Lormand)	Moves like a Queen but is restricted to a maximum of two spaces.
Pterodactyl		~3/3, ~5/5, ~0/15	(3,3)(5,5)(0,15)	Chess mathematics	The simplest triple range amphibian. George Jelliss demonstrated a pterodactyl's knight's tour on a 16×16 board in 1985.
Pyramid				Fairy Chess problems	Rediscovered by Joseph Boyer (Les Jeux d'échecs non orthodoxes, 1951), never moves, cannot be taken. It blocks its square. Compare with Dummy, and Zero.
Q
Quadrapawn		o1+, c1X	mWcF	Jeu de la Guerre (Prague, 1770), Centennial Chess (J.W.Brown, 2001)	It moves as a Pawn in all four directions. Optionally, may move two squares forward without capture like a Pawn. Originally called a Fusilier (1770). Also called Steward, Hobbit.
Quartermaster	K	1✳	K = WF	The Ouroboros King	Moves like a King, promotes to a Pawn & leaves another Pawn behind where it was
Queen	Q	n✳	Q = RB	Orthodox chess	Combines the powers of the Bishop and Rook. In Pacific Chess (Hawaii, 1971) a piece with Queen-like moves is called the Nobleman. Called Honno or Free King in Chu shogi
Queen of the Night	ET	n✳, n~(1/2)	QNN	Twenty-first Century Chess (J. P. Jeliss, 1991)	Combines the powers of the Queen and Nightrider. Also known as Amazonrider.
Querquisite				Fairy Chess problems (J. E. H. Creed 1947), Lumberjack Chess (Bruce Zimove 1983), Morph Chess (Karl Scherer 2000), Zelig Chess (Stan Druben 2001)	A piece that changes its move according to the file where it is standing, moves as a Rook from files a and h, as a Knight from files b and g, as a Bishop from files c and f, as a Queen from file d, and as a King from file e. Also known as Odysseus (H. Schmidt 1988), Lumberjack, or Zelig.
Quight		on✳, c~ 1/2	mQcN	Parton's Chess	Moves like a Queen and captures like a Knight. First proposed by V.R. Parton in Chess Curiouser & Curiouser (1961). See also Kneen.
Quintessence	QN			Quintessential Chess (J. Knappen, 2002)	A Nightrider who takes 90-degree turns in a zigzag manner on each step. First described in 2002 by Jörg Knappen.
R
Raiding Falcon		n<>, 1+, 1X>	vRWfF	Wa shogi	Combination of Vertical Mover and Stone General (Reverse Chariot and Flying Cock). Occurs in Taikyoku shogi with a different move.
Raven	WA	n+, n(~1/2)	RNN	Fairy Chess problems	Combination of Rook and Nightrider. Also known as Waran.
Reaper		n+, 1X.n+	Rt[FR]	Tripunch Chess (Betza, 2002)	Combination of Rook and Gryphon. Compare with Harvester.
Reflecting Bishop	RB	nX (bounce edges)	B (bounce edges)	Billiards Chess (M. Jacques Berthoumeau, 1950s), Edgehog Chess II (John Driver, 1966) & III (P. Aronson)	Bishop allowed to "bounce" off any number of edges of the board, similar to a hockey puck or billiard ball. It bounces from the center of each edge square and continues on a diagonal.
Revealer (Tamerlane)		~ 3X	G = (3,3)	Full Tamerlane Chess (al-Âmulî & Arabshâh, 14th–15th centuries)	See Tripper. Also known as Sentinel.
Reverse Chariot		n<>	vR	Chu shogi and other large Shōgi variants	Rook restricted to forward and backward directions.
Rhinoceros		1+.nX	t[WB]	Modern (e.g. Zanzibar Chess, Gigachess, Terachess)	Moves as a Wazir (1-step as a Rook) followed by moving any number of spaces diagonally outwards. Inspired by medieval Unicornio. Now known as Manticore.
Rhubarb		n+, 1-3X	RF3	Chess with different armies (R. Betza, 1979)	Rook that can also move up to 3 spaces diagonally.
Right General		1X, 1<>, 1= (only left)	FvlW	Dai dai shogi and other large Shōgi variants	Asymmetrical combination of Ferocious Leopard and left Wazir.
Right Quail		n>, nX< (left diagonal), 1X<	fRblBbrF	Tori shogi and other large Shōgi variants	Combination of Lance, Ferz and a backward Bishop restricted to left side.
Rion	RL		pR	Fairy Chess problems	Fairy chess Lion confined to horizontal and vertical lines. Used in Janggi (Korean chess) as Cannon (Korean). Also called Rook-line-hopper or Rook Lion by problemists.
Roc		~ 2/2 ~ 1/3	AC = AL	Beastmaster Chess (G. Overby, 2002)	Combination of Alfil and Camel
Rook	R	n+	R = WW	Chaturanga, Orthodox chess, Shatranj, Xiangqi, Janggi, Shogi, Taikyoku shogi, Wa shogi, Tamerlane chess	Moves any number of free squares orthogonally. Also called Gliding Swallow in taikyoku shogi and wa shogi, Ratha (chariot) in chaturanga, Rukh in shatranj and tamerlane chess, Wazirrider, or Castle (colloquial).
Rook (Quang Trung)	TR	on+, c^n+	mR[cl]R	Quang Trung Chess (V. Q. Vo, 1999)	Moves as Rook but when capturing must move on square away from captured piece in the same direction. It can be described as a Marine Rook or Triton (see Compound pieces)
Rookhopper	RH	^n+	gR	Fairy Chess problems	Grasshopper confined to horizontal and vertical lines. Also spelled Rook-hopper.
Root-25-leaper	BU	~ 5+, ~ 3/4	(0,5)(3,4)	Fairy Chess problems	Leaper making moves of length $\sqrt{25}$ units (i.e. a (0,5)-leaper or a (3,4)-leaper). Also called Fiveleaper. and Bucephalus (Fairy Chess problems)
Root-50-leaper	RF	~ 1/7, ~ 5X	(1,7)(5,5)	Fairy Chess problems	Leaper making moves of length $\sqrt{50}$ units (i.e. a (5,5)-leaper or a (1,7)-leaper). Also spelled Root-fifty-leaper.
Rose	RO	n(1/2) (turn at each jump)	qN	Chess on a Really Big Board	Moves as a Nightrider except rather than moving in a straight line, it moves in a pseudo-circular shape (e.g. e1-g2-h4-g6-e7-c6-b4-c2-e1). A piece on any of these squares can be captured but prevents the rose from progressing any further. It may return to its starting point if its path is unblocked, effectively passing a turn.
Roshop		on+, cnX	mRcB	Enlarged & Improved Chess, Parton's Chess	Moves like a Rook and captures like a Bishop. First proposed in Holland (1696) as a Guard, then by V.R. Parton in Chess Curiouser & Curiouser (1961). See also Biok.
Rotating Spearman				Centennial Chess (J.W.Brown, 2001)	Piece marked with a direction. It slides any number of squares in its direction or in its reverse direction (forward and backward, never sideward). Captures forward only, never backward. In addition, may rotate after a move or rotate without moving. It cannot rotate and then move.
Royal Guard		cn✳, o1✳	cQmK	The Ouroboros King	Captures like a Queen & moves like a King/Mann.
Rutabaga		1-2+,nX	W2B	Chess with different armies (R. Betza, 1979)	Bishop that can also move 2 spaces orthogonally.
Running Rabbit		n>, 1X, 1<	fRFbW	Taikyoku shogi, Wa shogi	Combination of Lance and Old Monkey.
S
Saltador	SA	c~1/2, o1/2	cnNmpN	Fairy Chess problems (M. Rittirsch, 2016)	Argentinian Knight, captures like a Knight when one of the intermediate squares is unoccupied, and moves without capturing as a Knight when one of the intermediate squares is occupied
Scorpion		1✳n^✳	KgQ	Fairy Chess problems	Combination of Mann (non-royal King) and Grasshopper
Scorpion (Winther)		o1>, c1X>, io2>, o~ 1/2> (wide)	mfWcefFimfnDmfsN	Scorpion Chess (M. Winther, 2006)	A boosted Pawn which moves and captures as a standard Pawn or can make a non-capturing Knight jump on 2 position: east-north-east and west-north-west.
Scout		1+, ~3+	WH	Brouhaha (Greg Strong)	Combination of Wazir and Threeleaper.
Señora	SE	cn✳, o^n✳	cQmpQ	Fairy Chess problems (M. Rittirsch, 2016)	Argentinian Queen, captures like a Queen but needs a hurdle for non-capturing moves, combination of Faro and Loco
Sergeant		1✳>, io2>	fKimfnD	Wolf Chess (A. von Wilpert, 1943)	Extended Pawn, combining the regular Pawn and the Berolina Pawn that is, it can move to, or capture on, any of the three squares immediately in front. Generally, it cannot make the initial diagonal double-step from Berolina Pawn, only that straight double-step of the regular Pawn. Originally Vogt (Sergeant, Inspector) in German.
Ship		1X.n<>	t[FvR]	Tamerlane II chess	Moves one square diagonally followed by moving any number of spaces like a rook vertically outwards (moving away from where it started). Also called Twin Tower by Betza due the pattern of its move. Compare with Gryphon or Eagle.
Short Rook		1-4+	R4 = W4	Chess with different armies (R. Betza, 1979)	Rook limited up to 4 squares. Also spelled Short-Rook.
Side Mover		n=, 1+	WsR	Chu shogi, Wa shogi, and other large Shōgi variants	Combination of a Rook restricted to sideways and Wazir. Called Swallow's Wings in Wa shogi.
Silver General		1X, 1>	FfW	Shōgi, Indian chess (Biruni, c. 1030), Makruk (Thai chess), Sittuyin (Burmese chess), Taikyoku shogi, Wa shogi	Combination of Ferz and Soldier: moves one square in any direction diagonally or one square straight forward. Also called Burmese Elephant Hsin in sittuyin (Burmese chess), Elephant in some versions of Indian chess, Khon in makruk (Thai chess), and Violent Stag in taikyoku shogi and wa shogi.
Sissa		n+.nX, nX.n+		Coherent Chess, Sissa Chess	Moves as a certain number of squares as a Rook followed by exactly the same number of squares as a Bishop. Or the opposite. The Sissa does not leap. This piece (invented by Carlos Cetina in the 1980s) has been named after the mythical inventor of chess in Persian legends.
Snake		1<>.nX	t[vWB]	Modern Variants (Betza, Silverman, Cazaux)	Moves vertically one step and continues as a Bishop outwards. Originally called Snaketongue by Betza due to the pattern of its move.
Soaring Eagle		n+, nX<, 1X>, ~ 2X>	RbBfFfA or RbBdhfFfA	Chu shogi and other large Shōgi variants	Moves as a Rook, backwards as a Bishop, or as a Lion (Japanese) up to 2 squares diagonally forward.
Soldier (Chess.com)		1>, io2>	fWimfnD	Chess.com	Moves & captures directly forward, it may perform the initial double step move option
Soldier (Silberschmidt)		o1>=, c1X>	mfWmsWcfF	Silberschmidt's Game (1827), Lias' Proposal (c. 1920), Zanzibar, Bigorra (Cazaux)	Extended Pawn, moves one square orthogonally forward, left or right, and captures diagonally forward.
Sorcerer		1+, ~ 2/3	WZ	Grand Tamerlane Chess (J.Davis)	Combines the movement of Wazir and Zebra.
Sorceress	LE	on✳, c^✳	mQcpQ	Akenhead's Chess (1947), Terachess (Cazaux, 2008)	Moves like a Queen when not capturing, but captures by leaping over an intervening piece and taking the piece on the Sorceress's destination square (the captured piece can be any number of squares beyond the hurdle). Also called Star, or Leo by problemists.
Spider (Musketeer)		~ 1/2, 1-2X, ~ 2+	NDF2	Musketeer Chess 5 (Zied Haddad, 2012)	Combination of Ferz, Knight, Alfil, and Dabbaba.
Spy		1+ or 2>, 2=, 1X> or 1✳	W = (0,1) or fsDfF or WF (=K)	Courier Chess (12th century), Chess Empire (2002), Waterloo (2014), Amsterdam Medieval Chess (2017)	In Courier Chess see Fool. In Chess Empire the spy can move two spaces forwards or sideways, or can move like a knight one forward and then one horizontally or vice versa. In Waterloo and Amsterdam Medieval Chess the spy moves as a non-royal King (see Mann).
Squire		1✳, ~ 2✳	KAD = WFAD	Fairy Chess Problems, Renn Chess (Greenwood, 1980)	Combination of non-royal King or Mann (Wazir+Ferz) and Alibaba (Alfil+Dabbaba). Also known as Mastodon and Mammoth (Winther), Squire (Renn Chess) and Pasha (Paulovits).
Squirrel	SQ	~ 0/2, ~ 1/2, ~ 2/2	NAD	Fairy Chess problems (N. Kovacs, 1937), Mideast Chess (California, 1971), Pacific Chess (Hawaii, 1971), Renn Chess (1980), Quintessential Chess (J. Knappen, 2002)	Jumps to any square a distance of 2. Also called Castle (Mideast chess, Pacific chess, Renn chess), Bear (Sosnovsky, 1985) or Centurion (Quintessential Chess). Compare with the historical Centurion in Arch-Chess.
Stag		~ 2/4	(2,4)	Cazaux's chess	Jumps two squares diagonally followed by two squares orthogonally outwards. Also known as Lancer or Hare (original German name Hase) by problemists.
Steward		o1+, c1X	mWcF	Jeu de la Guerre (Prague, 1770), Centennial Chess (J.W.Brown, 2001)	A Quadra-Pawn. It moves as a Pawn in all four directions, i.e. it moves like a Ferz and captures like a Wazir. Optionally, may moves two squares forward without capture like a Pawn. Originally called a Fusilier (1770).
Stone General		1X>	fF	Dai shogi and other large Shōgi variants, Fox and Geese	Moves one square diagonally forward. Also called Goose in Fox and Geese. Compare with Berolina Pawn.
Superpawn	SP	on>, cnX>	mfRcfB	Fairy Chess problems	Moves without capture any number of fields forward, captures diagonally forwards like a Bishop. Promotes on the 8th rank. May be placed in the first rank. By Werner Speckmann (1967).
Sylph (Dragonchess)				Dragonchess (3D)	See Berolina Pawn (on upper board). 3D movement: Can capture to the cell below it and return without capturing.
T
Templar		~ 2+, ~ 1/2	ND	Fairy Chess problems	Combination of Knight and Dabbaba. Also known as Doughnut (Betza), Ouroboros (Knappen), Scribe (Joyce and Bagley-Jones) or Carpenter (Gilman).
Teutonic Knight		1+, ~ 1/2, ~ 1/3	WNC = WNL	Teutonic Knight's Chess (J. Knappen, 2009)	Combination of Knight, Wazir and Camel. Originally Ordensritter in German.
Thief (Dragonchess)				Dragonchess (3D, 1985)	See Bishop (bound to middle board). No 3D movement.
Titan		~1/3, ~2/3, ~0/3, ~3/3	CZGH = LJGH	Fantasy Grand Chess: Giants	Leaper combining Camel, Zebra, Threeleaper and Tripper. Called Cheetah in modern chessvariants played with AI AI. (http://mrraow.com/index.php/aiai-home/aiai/)
Threeleaper		~ 3+	H = (0,3)	Full Tamerlane Chess (al-Âmulî & Arabshâh, 14th–15th centuries)	Jumps three squares orthogonally, leaping over any intermediate piece. Also called Trébuchet. Known as 'dromedary' (original German Dromedar) by German problemists. Possibly the Lion in Full Tamerlane Chess.
Threerider		n(3+)	HH	Fairy Chess problems	
Tiger		~ 2/3.nX	t[ZB]=t[JB]	Tiger Chess (Zacharias)	Moves as a Zebra followed by moving any number of spaces diagonally outwards like a Bishop.
Toad		~2+, ~3+	DH	Fairy Chess problems	Combination of Dabbaba and Threeleaper. A simple amphibian.
Treacherous Fox		~ 1-2✴<>	FfbWAfbD	Wa shogi	Ferocious Leopard that can move forward or backward as Alibaba. Occurs in Taikyoku shogi with a different move.
Tripper		~ 3X	G = (3,3)		Jumps three squares diagonally, leaping over any intermediate piece. Known as Gecko by German chess problemists.
Troll		o1>, c1X>, ~0/3, ~3/3	mfWcfFGH	Modern Variants (Cazaux)	Amphibian piece combining Threeleaper, Tripper with the simple moves of the Pawn (no e.p., no double step) in order to be able to reach all squares of the board. Used in modern chessvariants played with AI AI.
Twin Tower		1X.n<>	t[FvR]	Tamerlane II chess	Moves one square diagonally followed by moving any number of spaces like a rook vertically outwards (moving away from where it started). Also called Ship.
U
Ubi-Ubi		n(1/2) (any direction)	NN (any direction)	Ubi-Ubi Chess (Versmissen, Borst & Bodlaender, 1998)	A Nightrider without direction restrictions.
Unicorn (Raumschach)				Raumschach (1907)	A space diagonal rider: moves through the vertices of the cubes (see diagram at Fairy chess piece#Higher dimensions).
Unicorn (Unicorn Chess)		nX, ~n(1/2)	BNN	Unicorn Chess (D. Paulowich 2000)	Combines the powers of Bishop and Nightrider, see Banshee
Unicorn (Triangular Chess)		2<>.1=, 2=.1<>		Triangular chess	Moves 2 steps as a rook and then one step as a rook in an orthogonal direction.
Unicorn (Dragon Chess)				Dragonchess (3D, 1985)	See Knight (bound to middle board). No 3D movement.
Unicorn (Grant Acedrex)		~o1/2.nX	BimN	Grant Acedrex (Alfonso X, 1283, interpreted by H.J.R. Murray, 1913)	Bishop with a first movement of a Knight that cannot capture. For Cazaux interpretation, see Unicornio
Unicorn (Musketeer)		~1/2, ~1/3	NC = NL	Musketeer Chess (Zied Haddad, 2012)	See Gnu or Wildebeest.
Unicorn (5D)				5D Chess with Multiverse Time Travel (Thunkspace, 2020)	Analogue of Bishop in higher dimensions, and generalization of Unicorn (Raumschach). 3D diagonal movement: Any moves must incorporate three of the game's four axes equally, resulting in either diagonal spatial dimension movements paired with orthogonal temporal and timeline movements, or vice versa. Compare with Dragon (5D).
Unicornio (Grant Acedrex)		~ 1/2.nX	t[NB] (or t[NfB])	Grant Acedrex (Alfonso X, 1283)	Moves as a Knight followed by moving any number of spaces diagonally outwards (most probably, or forwards?). Originally Unicornio in ancient Spanish, obviously designating a Rhinoceros. For Murray's interpretation, see Unicorn.
V
Vanguard		nX (except 1X)	B (except F)	Tamerlane Chess (1336–1405)	Bishop that cannot move as a Ferz (adjacent diagonal squares must be free and skipped). Originally known as Talî'a in Persian. Also known as Scout.
Vao	VA	onX, c~nX (over exactly one hurdle)	mBcpB	Akenhead's Chess (1947)	Moves like a Bishop when not capturing, but captures by leaping over an intervening piece and taking the piece on the vao's destination square (the captured piece can be any number of squares beyond the hurdle). Also called Crocodile (Zanzibar Chess, Gigachess, Terachess).
Vertical Mover		n<>, 1+	WfbR	Chu shogi and other large Shōgi variants	Combination of Reverse Chariot and Wazir (or Drunk Elephant).
Violent Bear		1=, 2X>	sWnfB2	Dai dai shogi and other large Shōgi variants	Moves 1 square sideways or 1 or 2 squares diagonally forward.
Violent Ox		2+	R2	Dai shogi and other large Shōgi variants	A Rook restricted to a distance of two squares. See War Machine.
Vivi		1<>.nX>	t[vWfB]	Modern Variants (Betza)	Moves vertically forward or backward one step and continues as a Bishop forwards. So called for the pattern of its move.
Vouivre		~0/2, ~2/2, ~1/2, ~1/3	DNAC = DNAL	Beautiful Beasts (Knappen 2021)	Combination piece of Carpenter and Roc, or alternatively, of Squirrel and Camel, or Gnu and Alibaba
W
Waffle		1+, ~ 2X	WA	Chess with different armies, Chu shogi, and other Shōgi variants	Combination of Wazir and Alfil. Known as Phoenix in large shogis and as Caliph (Jelliss, Simple Chess Variants).
Wallaby		1✳, 2✳ (over friendly pieces)	KgQ2 (over friendly pieces), KcjQ2	Edgehog Chess III (P. Aronson)	Combination of omni-directional Checker and Grasshopper restricted to 2 squares over friendly pieces.
Waran	WA	n+, n(~1/2)	RNN	Fairy Chess problems	Combination of Rook and Nightrider. Also spelled Varan. Also known as Raven.
War Machine		~ 1−2+ = 1+, ~ 2+	WD	Chess with different armies, Terachess, Zanzibar Chess	Combination of Wazir and Dabbaba. Also called Wazaba, Woody Rook (Betza, 1979) or simply Machine.
Warrior (Dragonchess)				Dragonchess (3D, 1985)	See Pawn (Shatranj) (bound to middle board). No 3D movement.
Warrior		1✳, ~ 2+	WFD	Reformed Courier chess	Combines the powers of the Mann and the Dabbaba. Alternative name for Champion which is more associated to another piece (Wazir-Alfil-Dabbaba).
Wazir	WE	1+	W = (0,1)	Tamerlane Chess (al-Âmulî & Arabshâh, 14th–15th centuries), Courier chess, Renn Chess (1980)	Moves one square orthogonally in any direction. Persian Vizir. Also known as Angry Boar (Dai shogi), Crocodile (Tamerlane Chess, originally Luxm, "sea monster" in Persian) or Fool, Jester (German: Schleich for Courier chess), Fox (Renn Chess).
Whale		n<>, nX<	vRbB	Chu shogi and other large Shōgi variants	Combination of Hunter and Reverse Chariot.
White Horse		n<>, nX>	vRfB	Chu shogi and other large Shōgi variants	Combination of Falcon and Reverse Chariot.
Wildebeest	GN	~ 1/2, ~ 1/3	NC = NL	Wildebeest Chess (R.W. Schmittberger, 1987)	Combination of Knight and Camel, see Gnu.
Wildeguard		1✳, ~ 1/2, ~ 1/3	KCZ = WFCZ = KLZ	Obento Chess (E.Silverman)	Combines the movement of Mann, Knight and Camel.
Withdrawer			mQ[cw]Q	Ultima	Also known as Retreater
Wizard		1X, ~ 1/3	FC = FL	Omega Chess	Combines the movement of Ferz and Camel.
Wood General		2X>	fB2	Dai dai shogi and other large Shōgi variants	Flying Dragon restricted to forward moves.
Woody Rook		~ 1−2+ = 1+, ~ 2+	WD	Chess with different armies (Betza, 1979)	See War Machine.
Wyvern		~ 3X ~ 2/4 ~ 1/5	G(2,4)(1,5) = (3,3)(2,4)(1,5)	Beastmaster Chess (G. Overby, 2002)	Combination of Tripper, Stag, and Ibis.
X, Y, Z
Yaksha		3=, 1X>, 1+<	fFbWsW3	Taikyoku shogi	Move as forward Ferz, backward Wazir, and up to 3 squares horizontally
Zabel Pawn		o1>, c1X>, final o2>	mfWcfF final mfW2	Fairy Chess problems	Moves and captures like a chess pawn, but instead of an initial double step it has a final double step move from the 6th to the 8th rank. Named after the cycling sprinter Erik Zabel
Zaraffa	Z	~ 2/3	Z = J = (2,3)	Grant Acedrex (Alfonso X, 1283)	Old historic piece. Jumps one square orthogonally followed by two squares diagonally outwards. Also called Zebra by problemists.
Zebra	Z	~ 2/3	Z = J = (2,3)	Full Tamerlane Chess (al-Âmulî & Arabshâh, 14th–15th centuries), Grant Acedrex (Alfonso X, 1283), Ciccolini's Chess (1820), Mideast Chess (1971)	Old historic piece. Jumps one square orthogonally followed by two squares diagonally outwards. Also called Zaraffa (Grant Acedrex), Elephant (Ciccolini's Chess), Courtier (Mideast Chess).
Zebrarider	ZR	n(2/3)	ZZ = JJ	Fairy Chess problems	A rider which moves any number of (3,2) cells (i.e., Zebra moves) in the same direction in a straight line.
Zebu	ZE	~ 1/3, ~ 1/4	C(1,4) = L(1,4)	Fairy Chess problems	Combination of Camel and Giraffe.
Zero		~ 0/0	(0,0)	Fairy Chess problems	A (0,0) leaper. Jumps and lands on the square where it stands. It allows to pass a turn. It can be captured. Invented by A.S.M. Dickins
