= Dragonchess =

Three-dimensional chess variant by Gary Gygax

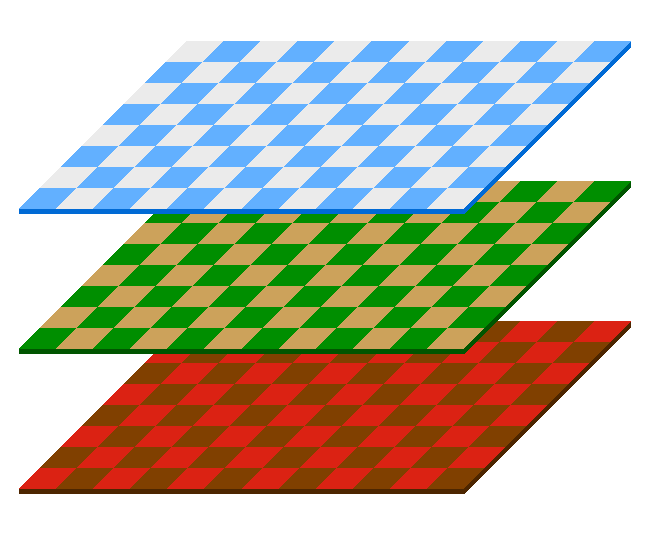
The Dragonchess 3D gameboard:
- Air (upper board)
- Land (middle board)
- Subterranean world (lower board)

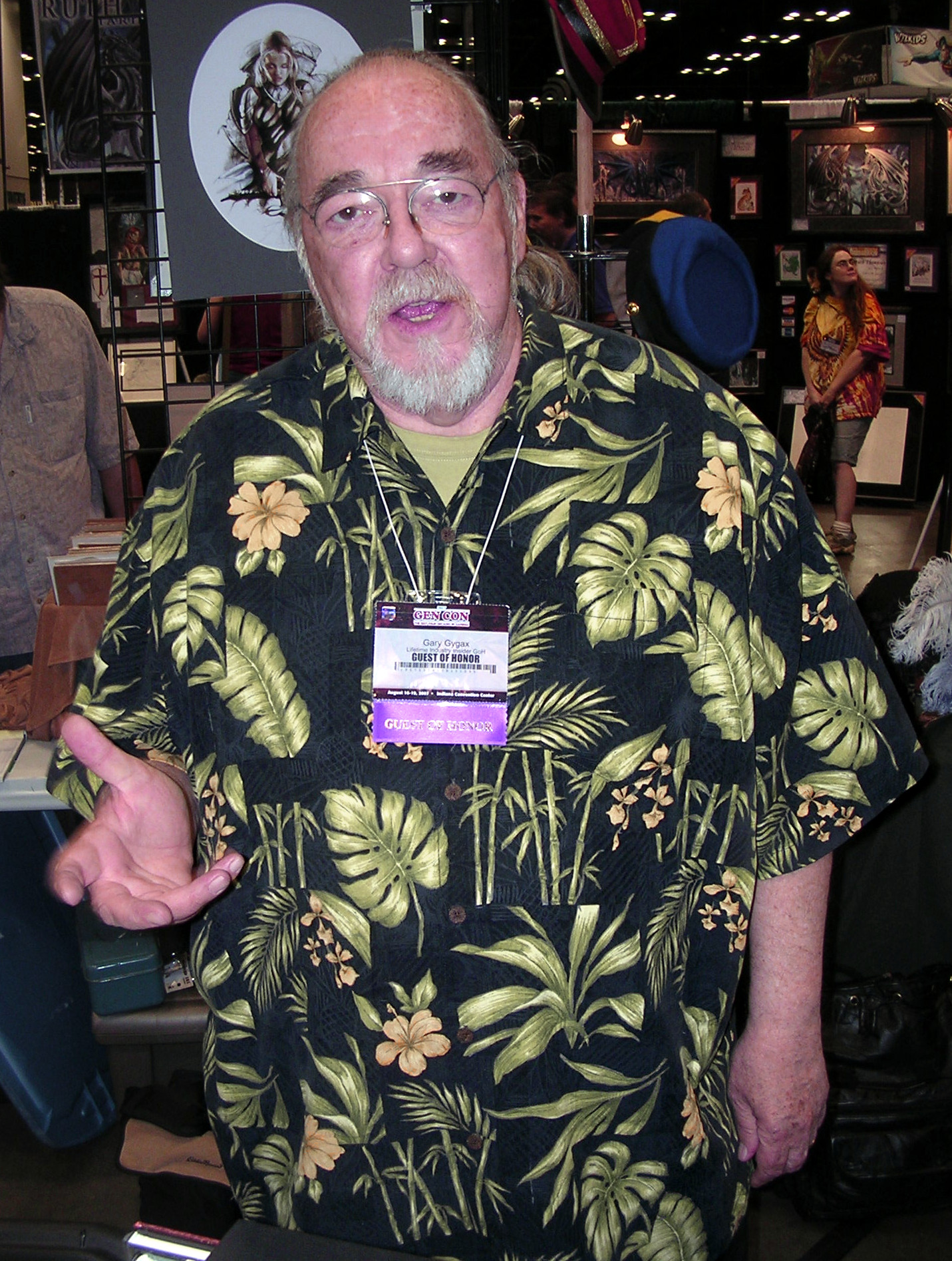
Gary Gygax

Dragonchess is a three-dimensional fantasy chess variant created by Gary Gygax, co-creator of the role-playing game Dungeons & Dragons. The game was introduced in 1985 in issue No. 100 of Dragon Magazine.

== Boards and pieces ==
The Dragonchess gameboard consists of three 12×8 chess boards stacked vertically. The upper board (blue and white) represents the air, the middle board (green and amber) represents the land, and the lower board (red and brown) is the subterranean world (Gygax 1985:34).

The Dragonchess game pieces (42 per player) are an ensemble of characters and monsters inspired or derived from fantasy settings in Dungeons & Dragons. Intricate inter- and intra-level game piece capabilities are defined. The players are Gold and Scarlet, with Gold moving first. There is no castling. As in chess, the game is won by delivering checkmate to the enemy king.

=== Upper board (level 3) ===
	a	b	c	d	e	f	g	h	i	j	k	l
8	a8	b8	c8 black zebra	d8	e8	f8	g8 D d	h8	i8	j8	k8 black zebra	l8	8
7	a7 black upside-down pawn	b7	c7 black upside-down pawn	d7	e7 black upside-down pawn	f7	g7 black upside-down pawn	h7	i7 black upside-down pawn	j7	k7 black upside-down pawn	l7	7
6	a6	b6	c6	d6	e6	f6	g6	h6	i6	j6	k6	l6	6
5	a5	b5	c5	d5	e5	f5	g5	h5	i5	j5	k5	l5	5
4	a4	b4	c4	d4	e4	f4	g4	h4	i4	j4	k4	l4	4
3	a3	b3	c3	d3	e3	f3	g3	h3	i3	j3	k3	l3	3
2	a2 white upside-down pawn	b2	c2 white upside-down pawn	d2	e2 white upside-down pawn	f2	g2 white upside-down pawn	h2	i2 white upside-down pawn	j2	k2 white upside-down pawn	l2	2
1	a1	b1	c1 white zebra	d1	e1	f1	g1 D l	h1	i1	j1	k1 white zebra	l1	1
	a	b	c	d	e	f	g	h	i	j	k	l

Upper board starting position

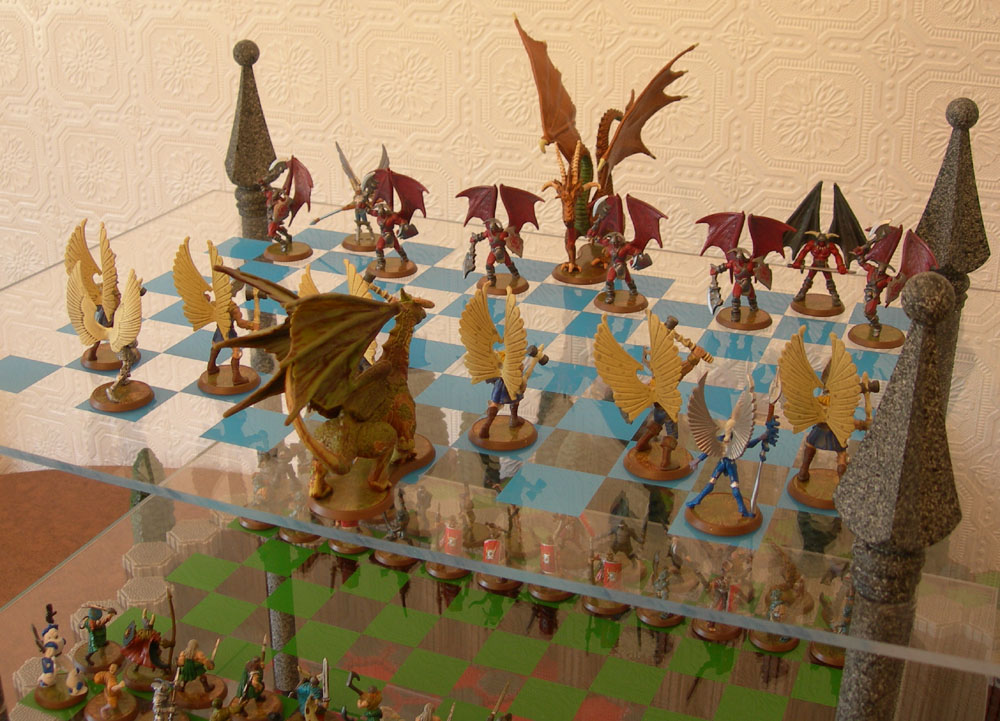
The Sky Board, by Zac Dortch

==== Sylph (S) ====
On level 3:
- can move without capturing one step diagonally forward, or capture one step straight forward (i.e. like a Berolina pawn, but without promotion or an initial two-step option).
- can capture on the square directly below on level 2.
On level 2:
- can move without capturing to the square directly above on level 3, or to one of the player's six Sylph starting squares.

==== Griffon (G) ====
On level 3:
- can move and capture like a zebra, i.e. it can move two steps diagonally followed by one step orthogonally outward, jumping over any pieces in between.
- can move and capture to level 2, to a square diagonally adjacent to the square directly below (i.e. one step downward along a space diagonal).
On level 2:
- can move and capture one step diagonally;
- can move and capture to level 3, to a square diagonally adjacent to the square directly above (i.e. one step upward along a space diagonal).

==== Dragon (R) ====
- On level 3, can move and capture either any number of squares diagonally or one step orthogonally (i.e. like a dragon horse in shogi, or a combined king and bishop from standard chess); it can never leave the upper board.
- Can capture remotely (without leaving level 3) any piece that stands on the square directly below on level 2 or any square orthogonally adjacent to that square.
  - It can capture only one piece at each turn, and the remote capture counts as a full move (i.e. the dragon may not move on level 3 and then capture remotely).

=== Middle board (level 2) ===
	a	b	c	d	e	f	g	h	i	j	k	l
8	a8 black upside-down bishop	b8 black unicorn	c8 black champion	d8 black bishop	e8 black upside-down king	f8 black wizard	g8 black king	h8 C d	i8 black bishop	j8 black champion	k8 black unicorn	l8 black upside-down bishop	8
7	a7 black pawn	b7 black pawn	c7 black pawn	d7 black pawn	e7 black pawn	f7 black pawn	g7 black pawn	h7 black pawn	i7 black pawn	j7 black pawn	k7 black pawn	l7 black pawn	7
6	a6	b6	c6	d6	e6	f6	g6	h6	i6	j6	k6	l6	6
5	a5	b5	c5	d5	e5	f5	g5	h5	i5	j5	k5	l5	5
4	a4	b4	c4	d4	e4	f4	g4	h4	i4	j4	k4	l4	4
3	a3	b3	c3	d3	e3	f3	g3	h3	i3	j3	k3	l3	3
2	a2 white pawn	b2 white pawn	c2 white pawn	d2 white pawn	e2 white pawn	f2 white pawn	g2 white pawn	h2 white pawn	i2 white pawn	j2 white pawn	k2 white pawn	l2 white pawn	2
1	a1 white upside-down bishop	b1 white unicorn	c1 white champion	d1 white bishop	e1 white upside-down king	f1 white wizard	g1 white king	h1 C l	i1 white bishop	j1 white champion	k1 white unicorn	l1 white upside-down bishop	1
	a	b	c	d	e	f	g	h	i	j	k	l

Middle board starting position

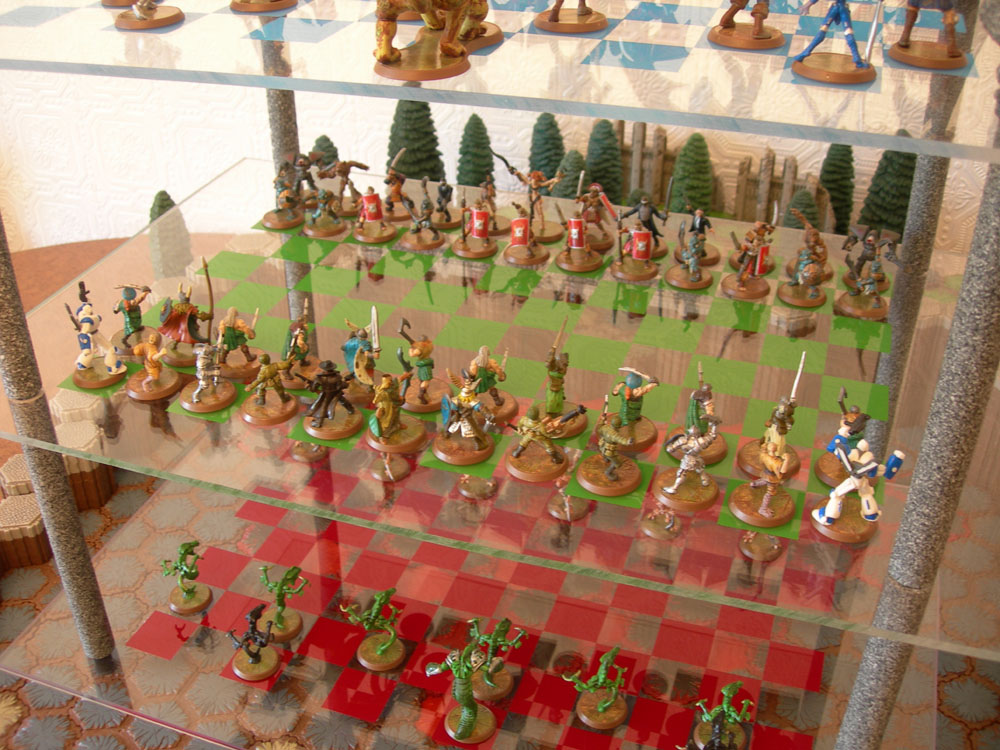
The Ground Board, by Zac Dortch

==== Warrior (W) ====
- On level 2, can move without capturing one step straight forward and capture one step diagonally (i.e. like a chess pawn but without the initial two-step option); it can never leave the middle board.
- Promotes to a Hero upon reaching the furthest rank.

==== Oliphant (O) ====
- On level 2, can move and capture like a chess rook (i.e. any number of squares orthogonally); it can never leave the middle board.

==== Unicorn (U) ====
- On level 2, can move and capture like a chess knight (i.e. one step orthogonally followed by one step diagonally outward, jumping over any intermediate squares); it can never leave the middle board.

==== Hero (H) ====
On level 2:
- can move and capture one or two steps diagonally (jumping over the intermediate square if moving two steps).
- can move and capture to levels 1 and 3, to a square diagonally adjacent to the square directly above or below (i.e. one step along a space diagonal).
On levels 1 and 3:
- can only move and capture back to level 2, again to a square diagonally adjacent to the square directly above/below (i.e. one step along a space diagonal).

==== Thief (T) ====
- On level 2, can move and capture like a chess bishop (i.e. any number of squares diagonally); it can never leave the middle board.

==== Cleric (C) ====
On any level:
- can move and capture one step orthogonally or diagonally (like a non-royal chess king).
- can move and capture to the square directly above or directly below on an adjacent level.

==== Mage (M) ====
On level 2:
- can move and capture any number of steps orthogonally or diagonally (like a chess queen).
On levels 1 and 3:
- can move (Note: Gygax does not mention whether this applies to only non-capturing moves, or to moves and captures.) one step orthogonally (like a wazir).
On any level:
- can move and capture one step or two steps (Note: Gygax does not mention whether the piece can jump over the intermediate square or not when making this move.) directly above or directly below to one of the other levels.

==== King (K) ====
On level 2:
- can move and capture like a chess king (i.e. one step orthogonally or diagonally).
- can move and capture to the square directly below on level 1 or directly above on level 3.
On levels 1 and 3:
- can only move back to the square directly above or below on level 2.

==== Paladin (P) ====
On level 2:
- can move and capture as a chess king or as a chess knight.
On levels 1 and 3:
- can move and capture like a chess king.
On any level:
- can move to the other levels using a knight-like move: one level up or down followed by two steps orthogonally, or two levels up or down followed by one step orthogonally.

=== Lower board (level 1) ===
	a	b	c	d	e	f	g	h	i	j	k	l
8	a8	b8	c8 black giraffe	d8	e8	f8	g8 black fool	h8	i8	j8	k8 black giraffe	l8	8
7	a7	b7 M d	c7	d7 M d	e7	f7 M d	g7	h7 M d	i7	j7 M d	k7	l7 M d	7
6	a6	b6	c6	d6	e6	f6	g6	h6	i6	j6	k6	l6	6
5	a5	b5	c5	d5	e5	f5	g5	h5	i5	j5	k5	l5	5
4	a4	b4	c4	d4	e4	f4	g4	h4	i4	j4	k4	l4	4
3	a3	b3	c3	d3	e3	f3	g3	h3	i3	j3	k3	l3	3
2	a2	b2 M l	c2	d2 M l	e2	f2 M l	g2	h2 M l	i2	j2 M l	k2	l2 M l	2
1	a1	b1	c1 white giraffe	d1	e1	f1	g1 white fool	h1	i1	j1	k1 white giraffe	l1	1
	a	b	c	d	e	f	g	h	i	j	k	l

Lower board starting position

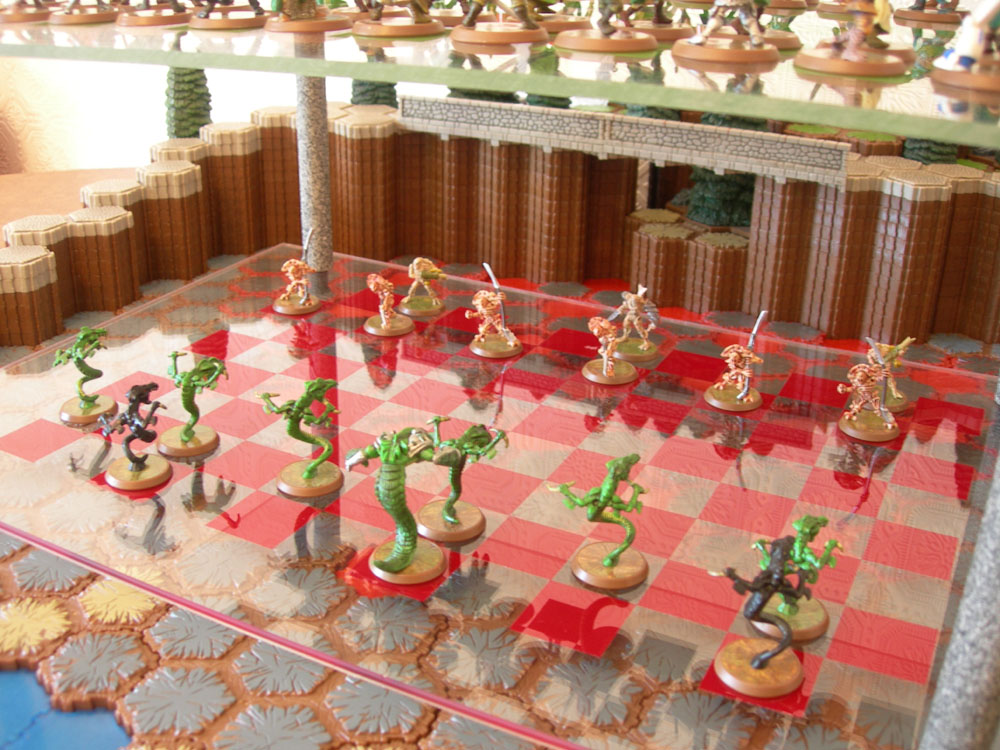
The Underground Board, by Zac Dortch

==== Dwarf (D) ====
On levels 1 and 2:
- can move (without capturing) one step straight forward or sideways, or capture one step diagonally forward.
- can capture directly upward from level 1 to level 2, and move (without capturing) directly downward from level 2 back to level 1.

==== Basilisk (B) ====
- On level 1, can move and capture one step diagonally forward or straight forward, or move (without capturing) one step straight backward; it cannot leave the lower board.
- Automatically freezes (immobilizes) an enemy piece on the square directly above on level 2 (whether the Basilisk moves to the space below or the enemy piece moves to the space above); the immobilized piece may not move until the Basilisk moves away or is captured.

==== Elemental (E) ====
On level 1:
- can move and capture one or two steps orthogonally;
- can move (without capturing) one step diagonally;
- can capture in the following pattern: one step orthogonally, followed by one step straight upward to level 2.
On level 2:
- can move and capture in the following pattern: one step directly downward to level 1, followed by one step orthogonally.

== Move notation ==
Recording moves is done the same as in algebraic notation for chess, extended to a 12×8 board, with the addition of a numeric prefix (1, 2, or 3) in front of each square coordinate to identify the level. (Note: Gygax initially describes levels beginning with "1" for upper board in the first page of his article (Gygax 1985:34), but consistently uses "3" for upper board and "1" for lower board in the subsequent six pages for all move definitions, examples, and sample moves (Gygax 1985:35–40).) So for example, White's Elemental starts on square 1g1 (level 1, square g1); Black's King starts on 2g8; and so on.
