= Avalanche chess =

Chess variant

Avalanche chess is a chess variant designed by Ralph Betza in 1977. After moving one of their own pieces, a player must move one of the opponent's pawns forward one square.

== Game rules ==
Rules are as normal chess except that after making a legal move, a player must move one of the opponent's pawns exactly one square straight forward (i.e. towards the player) to complete the turn, if possible. Otherwise, that part of the turn is skipped. Capturing with an opponent's pawn is not permitted. If an opponent's pawn is moved to promotion, then the opponent chooses to what piece it promotes; if the promotion gives check, the opponent wins the game. If every legal pawn move forward gives check, then the opponent wins immediately, even if the player checked or mated the opponent previously that same turn. There is no en passant capture.

=== Specifics regarding check ===
- Check can be given on either or both halves of a player's turn.
- A player in check must get out of check on the first half of their turn.
- A move into check is illegal even if moving an opponent's pawn on the second half of the turn would remove the check.
