= Tutti-frutti chess =

Chess variant

Position: a8 black chancellor, b8 black knight, c8 black bishop, d8 A d, e8 black king, f8 black queen, g8 black archbishop, h8 black rook, a7 black pawn, b7 black pawn, c7 black pawn, d7 black pawn, e7 black pawn, f7 black pawn, g7 black pawn, h7 black pawn, a2 white pawn, b2 white pawn, c2 white pawn, d2 white pawn, e2 white pawn, f2 white pawn, g2 white pawn, h2 white pawn, a1 white chancellor, b1 white knight, c1 white bishop, d1 A l, e1 white king, f1 white queen, g1 white archbishop, h1 white rook

Tutti-frutti chess starting position

Tutti-frutti chess is a chess variant invented by Ralph Betza and Philip Cohen in 1978. It has been played regularly in tournaments and correspondence games, such as those of the Italian Association of Chess Variants (Associazione Italiana Scacchi Eterodossi).

== Rules ==
The game is played using a standard chessboard, and follows all the rules and conventions of standard chess, with one difference: the queen's rooks are replaced by empresses (rook plus knight), the queens are replaced by amazons (queen plus knight), the king's bishops are replaced by queens and the king's knights are replaced by princesses (bishop plus knight). All other pieces are unchanged. A king may castle with a rook or empress, and pawns may promote to any piece that was on the board at the beginning of the game except the king (amazon, queen, empress, princess, rook, bishop, or knight).
