= Almost chess =

Chess variant

Position: a8 black rook, b8 black knight, c8 black bishop, d8 black chancellor, e8 black king, f8 black bishop, g8 black knight, h8 black rook, a7 black pawn, b7 black pawn, c7 black pawn, d7 black pawn, e7 black pawn, f7 black pawn, g7 black pawn, h7 black pawn, a2 white pawn, b2 white pawn, c2 white pawn, d2 white pawn, e2 white pawn, f2 white pawn, g2 white pawn, h2 white pawn, a1 white rook, b1 white knight, c1 white bishop, d1 white chancellor, e1 white king, f1 white bishop, g1 white knight, h1 white rook

Almost chess starting position. Chancellors replace queens.

Almost chess is a chess variant invented by Ralph Betza in 1977. The game is played using a standard chessboard and pieces, except that each player's queen is replaced by a chancellor, a piece which combines the moves of the rook and the knight.

Almost chess was featured in NOST (Note: NOST (kNights of the Square Table), a (now defunct) correspondence game club formed in 1960 by Bob Lauzon and Jim France, enjoyed several hundred active members (Pritchard 1994:210).) magazine Nost-algia, beginning with issue 205.

== Game description ==
Other than the replacement of queens by chancellors (notated "C"), the game follows all the rules and conventions of standard chess.

Replacing queens with chancellors imparts a radical change to the nature of the chess game, despite the queen and chancellor having approximately equal strengths. For example, bishops are stronger and knights are weaker. Betza commented that almost chess is a good introductory chess variant for players, due to its great similarity to standard chess and the naturalness of the change from queen to chancellor.

The fool's mate in almost chess begins 1.Cc3.

== Sort of almost chess ==
Position: a8 black rook, b8 black knight, c8 black bishop, d8 black chancellor, e8 black king, f8 black bishop, g8 black knight, h8 black rook, a7 black pawn, b7 black pawn, c7 black pawn, d7 black pawn, e7 black pawn, f7 black pawn, g7 black pawn, h7 black pawn, a2 white pawn, b2 white pawn, c2 white pawn, d2 white pawn, e2 white pawn, f2 white pawn, g2 white pawn, h2 white pawn, a1 white rook, b1 white knight, c1 white bishop, d1 white queen, e1 white king, f1 white bishop, g1 white knight, h1 white rook

Sort of almost chess starting position. In this diagram, Black owns the chancellor, but either player (but not both) may own it instead of the queen.

Around 1994, Betza invented sort of almost chess, a variation whereby one player owns a chancellor, and the opponent owns a queen. Betza considers the chances for both sides equal, even for advanced players, since the queen and chancellor have equal strengths.

Sort of almost chess emerged from Betza's research on the values of chess pieces, which culminated in the development of Chess with different armies.
