= Berolina pawn =

Fairy chess pawn

Position: b7 black circle, c7 black cross, d7 black circle, c6 white upside-down pawn, d4 black circle, e4 black upside-down pawn, h4 black circle, e3 black circle, f3 black cross, g3 black circle, f2 white upside-down pawn

The diagram shows white Berolina pawn move options (black dots) and capture squares ("×"). If the white f2-pawn advances to d4 in a single move, Black's e4-pawn can capture it en passant on e3.

The Berolina pawn (also known as Berlin pawn, anti-pawn, or simply Berolina) is a popular fairy chess piece based on the pawn. It may move one vacant square diagonally forward, it may move two vacant squares forward along a diagonal on its first move, and it may capture one square vertically forward. It was invented by Edmund Nebermann in 1926, who named it after the city of Berlin in which he worked. The Berolina pawn is featured in several chess variants, including Berolina chess, and these variants have been played in tournaments. Additionally, the Berolina pawn has found frequent use in chess problems.

In this article, the Berolina pawn is represented by an inverted pawn.

== Description ==
The Berolina pawn moves, without capturing, one square diagonally forward. It captures one square straight forward. (Thus, it is the converse of a standard chess pawn, which moves straight forward and captures diagonally forward.)

The Berolina has the option to move two squares diagonally forward on its first move. It can also capture en passant: a Berolina pawn, attacking a square that has just been bypassed by an enemy pawn's two-square advance, may capture the enemy pawn as if it had moved only one square. Like the orthodox pawn, the Berolina pawn is promoted when it reaches its last rank.

== Example problem ==
Dr. C. C. Lytton (original)

Position: e7 black knight, f7 white queen, b5 black upside-down pawn, d5 black rook, a4 white king, d3 white knight, a2 black king, d2 white upside-down pawn, h1 white rook

White mates in 2

Solution: 1.Qf2 ...

- 1...Rd4+ 2.b4#
- 1...Rxd3 2.dxd3#
- 1...Rc5 2.c3#
- 1...Re5 2.e3#
- 1...Rf5 2.f4#

== Berolina chess ==
Position: a8 black rook, b8 black knight, c8 black bishop, d8 black queen, e8 black king, f8 black bishop, g8 black knight, h8 black rook, a7 black upside-down pawn, b7 black upside-down pawn, c7 black upside-down pawn, d7 black upside-down pawn, e7 black upside-down pawn, f7 black upside-down pawn, g7 black upside-down pawn, h7 black upside-down pawn, a2 white upside-down pawn, b2 white upside-down pawn, c2 white upside-down pawn, d2 white upside-down pawn, e2 white upside-down pawn, f2 white upside-down pawn, g2 white upside-down pawn, h2 white upside-down pawn, a1 white rook, b1 white knight, c1 white bishop, d1 white queen, e1 white king, f1 white bishop, g1 white knight, h1 white rook

Berolina chess starting position.

Berolina chess, also called Berlin chess, is a chess variant employing the Berolina pawn. Berolina chess follows the same rules as standard chess, except that all the pawns are replaced by Berolina pawns. A number of tournaments have been conducted, including a correspondence event in 1957.

=== Strategy implications ===
Pritchard writes, "Pawns have greater mobility and can concentrate in the centre, a common opening strategy." Since a pawn attacks or defends only one square, their attacking ability is less, and diagonal pawn chains cannot be formed, resulting in frequent open files. Pawns are especially dangerous in the endgame since the route to promotion is easier. Draws in Berolina chess are rare.

=== Example game ===
Ralph Betza vs. Will Viveiros; NOST (Note: NOST (kNights Of the Square Table), a (now defunct) correspondence game club formed in 1960 by Bob Lauzon and Jim France, enjoyed several hundred active members.) tournament (1977)
1.ac4 ec5 2.d5 df5 3.bd4 Nc6 4.Bb2 Nf6 5.de3 e4 6.hf4 exe3 7.exe3 Ng4 8.Qd2 Qf6 9.Ne2 Nce5 10.Bc1 h6 11.ce4 Nc4 12.Qc3 Qg5 13.g3 Nf6 14.Nd2 Nxd2 15.Bxd2 f5 16.fe5 Nh5 17.d6 c6 (diagram) 18.e5 Qg7 19.Nd4 g4 20.Bb5 gxg3 21.Nxc6 cxc6 22.Bxc6+ Ke7 23.Bxa8 Ba6 24.c7 1–0

Position: a8 black rook, c8 black bishop, e8 black king, f8 black bishop, h8 black rook, a7 black upside-down pawn, c7 black upside-down pawn, f7 black upside-down pawn, c6 black upside-down pawn, d6 white upside-down pawn, h6 black upside-down pawn, c5 black upside-down pawn, d5 white upside-down pawn, f5 black upside-down pawn, g5 black queen, h5 black knight, d4 white upside-down pawn, e4 white upside-down pawn, c3 white queen, e3 white upside-down pawn, g3 white upside-down pawn, d2 white bishop, e2 white knight, g2 white upside-down pawn, a1 white rook, e1 white king, f1 white bishop, h1 white rook

Position after 17...c6

== Related pawn variants ==
Position: d6 black circle, e6 black cross, f6 black circle, d5 black cross, e5 white upside-down pawn, f5 black cross

The Berolina Plus

Position: d6 white circle, e6 white circle, f6 white circle, e5 white upside-down pawn

The sergeant can move to or capture on white dots.

Two famous pawn variants also used in problem compositions are the Berolina Plus and the sergeant.

- The Berolina Plus can move and capture the same as the Berolina pawn; in addition, it can capture one square horizontally (see first diagram).
- The sergeant combines the standard chess pawn and the Berolina pawn, excluding the Berolina pawn's two-square move; that is, it can move to, or capture on, any of the three squares immediately in front (see second diagram), and it can move two squares straight forward without capturing on its first move. It can be captured en passant, but it cannot capture en passant.

== See also ==
- Wolf chess – a chess variant employing sergeants
