= Falcon–hunter chess =

Chess variant

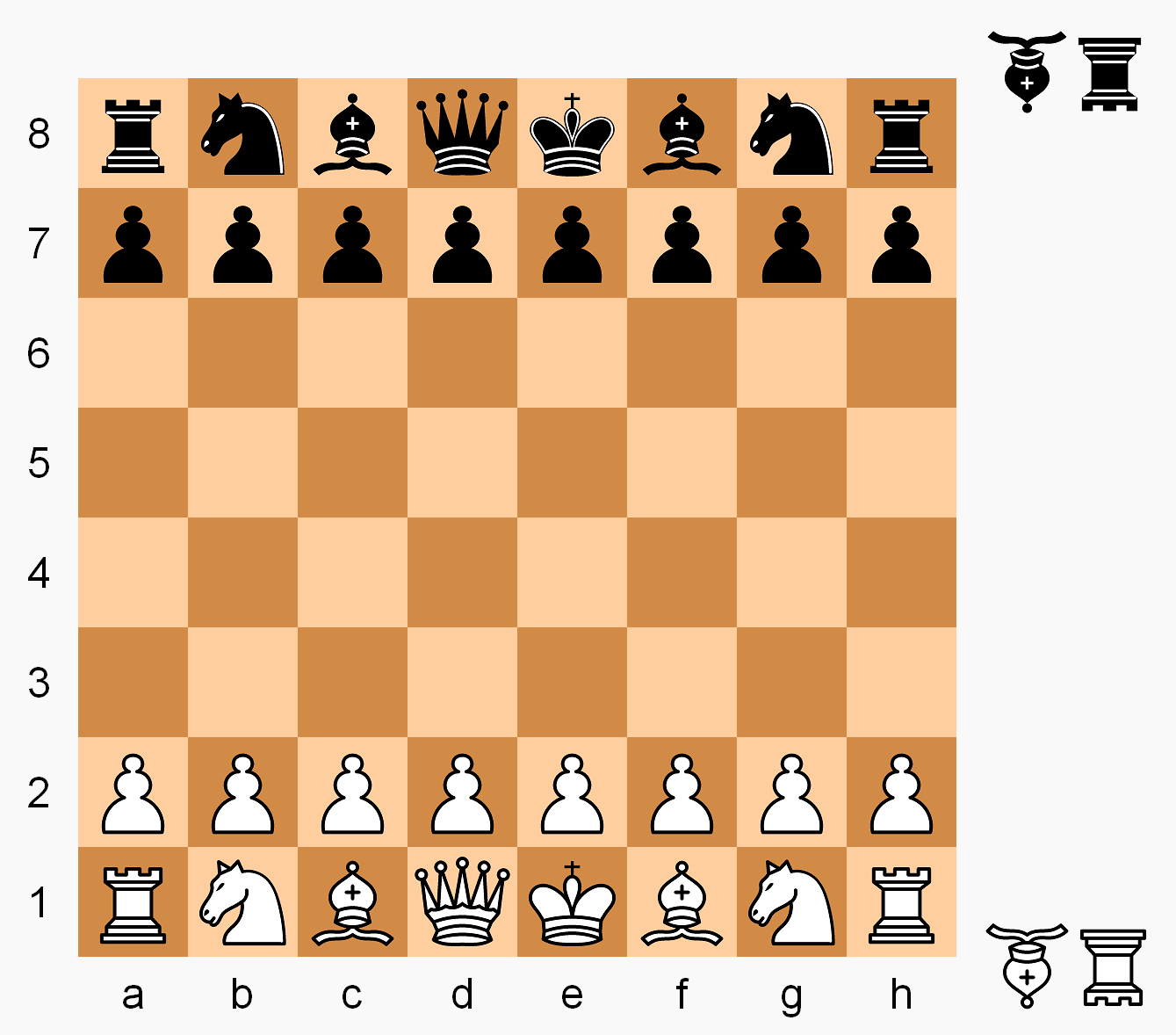
Falcon–hunter chess starting position. The falcon and the hunter, represented here by inverted pieces, are initially off the board.

Falcon–hunter chess (also called Schultz's chess, one-way chess, and meso chess) is a chess variant invented by Karl Schultz in 1943, employing the two fairy chess pieces falcon and hunter. The game takes several forms, including variations hunter chess and decimal falcon–hunter chess added in the 1950s.

== Moves of the falcon and hunter ==
- The falcon moves forward as a chess bishop (on diagonals), and backward as a chess rook (along a file).
- The hunter moves forward as a rook (along a file), and backward as a bishop (on diagonals).

Neither piece can move along a rank. The pieces capture the same as they move.

== Rules ==
All the rules and conventions and objective of standard chess apply, including the starting setup. The falcon and hunter start the game off the board and out of play (see diagram). Once a player loses (or exchanges) their queen, a rook, a bishop, or a knight, they may, on any subsequent move, enter their falcon or hunter into play on any empty square of their home rank. Doing so constitutes a turn. The player becomes eligible to enter their remaining fairy piece (falcon or hunter) after losing a second piece (queen, rook, bishop, or knight). A move entering the falcon or hunter into play may also give check.

=== Variations ===
- In one variation, the falcon and hunter are introduced only through pawn promotion: a pawn promotes only to falcon or hunter.
- In another variation, the starting setup is without queens, and each player's king starts on a new square added to the end of the e-file (the chessboard having a total of 66 squares). The hunter starts on the square normally reserved for the queen; the falcon starts on the square normally reserved for the king. A pawn may promote to any piece, including queen, falcon, or hunter.
- Falcon–hunter chess was renamed hunter chess in the 1950s, with rule addition that either a queen or king may castle using a hunter.

== Decimal falcon–hunter ==
	a	b	c	d	e	f	g	h	i	j
10	a10 black rook	b10 black knight	c10 black bishop	d10 black upside-down rook	e10 black queen	f10 black king	g10 B d	h10 black bishop	i10 black knight	j10 black rook	10
9	a9 black pawn	b9 black pawn	c9 black pawn	d9 black pawn	e9 black pawn	f9 black pawn	g9 black pawn	h9 black pawn	i9 black pawn	j9 black pawn	9
8	a8	b8	c8	d8	e8	f8	g8	h8	i8	j8	8
7	a7	b7	c7	d7	e7	f7	g7	h7	i7	j7	7
6	a6	b6	c6	d6	e6	f6	g6	h6	i6	j6	6
5	a5	b5	c5	d5	e5	f5	g5	h5	i5	j5	5
4	a4	b4	c4	d4	e4	f4	g4	h4	i4	j4	4
3	a3	b3	c3	d3	e3	f3	g3	h3	i3	j3	3
2	a2 white pawn	b2 white pawn	c2 white pawn	d2 white pawn	e2 white pawn	f2 white pawn	g2 white pawn	h2 white pawn	i2 white pawn	j2 white pawn	2
1	a1 white rook	b1 white knight	c1 white bishop	d1 white upside-down rook	e1 white queen	f1 white king	g1 B l	h1 white bishop	i1 white knight	j1 white rook	1
	a	b	c	d	e	f	g	h	i	j

Decimal falcon–hunter chess starting setup. In the diagram, falcons are represented by inverted bishops; hunters by inverted rooks.

Decimal falcon–hunter chess (also known as great one-way chess), invented in the 1950s, is played on a 10×10 board with the falcon and hunter already in the starting setup (see diagram). All the standard chess rules and conventions apply, with the following differences:

- On its first move, a pawn may advance 1, 2, or 3 steps. There is no en passant.
- On its first move, a knight has the option to move or capture by leaping in a (2,4) pattern (i.e. two steps as a nightrider, where the square corresponding to the first step is jumped).
- The king slides three squares when castling either kingside or queenside.
