= Paulovits's game =

Chess variant

	a	b	c	d	e	f	g	h	i	j
10	a10 black rook	b10 black knight	c10 black bishop	d10 black upside-down bishop	e10 black upside-down king	f10 black queen	g10 black king	h10 black bishop	i10 black knight	j10 black rook	10
9	a9 black pawn	b9 black pawn	c9 black pawn	d9 black pawn	e9 black pawn	f9 black pawn	g9 black pawn	h9 black pawn	i9 black pawn	j9 black pawn	9
8	a8	b8	c8	d8	e8	f8	g8	h8	i8	j8	8
7	a7	b7	c7	d7	e7	f7	g7	h7	i7	j7	7
6	a6	b6	c6	d6	e6	f6	g6	h6	i6	j6	6
5	a5	b5	c5	d5	e5	f5	g5	h5	i5	j5	5
4	a4	b4	c4	d4	e4	f4	g4	h4	i4	j4	4
3	a3	b3	c3	d3	e3	f3	g3	h3	i3	j3	3
2	a2 white pawn	b2 white pawn	c2 white pawn	d2 white pawn	e2 white pawn	f2 white pawn	g2 white pawn	h2 white pawn	i2 white pawn	j2 white pawn	2
1	a1 white rook	b1 white knight	c1 white bishop	d1 white upside-down bishop	e1 white upside-down king	f1 white queen	g1 white king	h1 white bishop	i1 white knight	j1 white rook	1
	a	b	c	d	e	f	g	h	i	j

Starting position

Paulovits's game is a chess variant on a 10×10 chess board, designed by István Paulovits, around 1890. It was described in the book Dames de Paulovits and in the Classified Encyclopedia of Chess Variants (2007). Paulovits's game differs from western chess in that two new ranks are introduced in between the armies and two new files in between the queen's bishop and the queen. The new files hold respectively a pasha and a general with a pawn in front. The general and pasha both have about the same value as a rook.

== Rules ==
The pasha jumps one or two squares in all eight orthogonal and diagonal directions and is thus a bit like a very short queen which can leap over other pieces. The general has the moves of a mann and a camel, that is it can jump to the eight adjacent squares or to the opposite corner of a 2×4 rectangle. Pawns can make an initial three-step move and a king castles by moving either two squares king-side or four squares queen-side.

Position: c6 black circle, e6 black circle, g6 black circle, d5 black cross, e5 black cross, f5 black cross, c4 black circle, d4 black cross, e4 white elephant, f4 black cross, g4 black circle, d3 black cross, e3 black cross, f3 black cross, c2 black circle, e2 black circle, g2 black circle

The moving of pasha (Betza notation WFDA)

Position: d7 black circle, f7 black circle, b5 black circle, d5 black cross, e5 black cross, f5 black cross, h5 black circle, d4 black cross, e4 white upside-down king, f4 black cross, b3 black circle, d3 black cross, e3 black cross, f3 black cross, h3 black circle, d1 black circle, f1 black circle

The moving of general (Betza notation WFL)

Position: b7 black cross, c7 black circle, d7 black cross, c6 white pawn, f5 black circle, f4 black circle, e3 black cross, f3 black circle, g3 black cross, f2 white pawn

The moving of pawn
