= Wolf chess =

Chess variant

	a	b	c	d	e	f	g	h
10	a10 black queen	b10 black empress	c10 black princess	d10 black rook	e10 black bishop	f10 black bishop	g10 N d	h10 black king	10
9	a9 black pawn	b9 black upside-down pawn	c9 black upside-down pawn	d9 black pawn	e9 black pawn	f9 black upside-down pawn	g9 black upside-down pawn	h9 black pawn	9
8	a8	b8 black pawn	c8 black pawn	d8	e8	f8 black pawn	g8 black pawn	h8	8
7	a7	b7	c7	d7	e7	f7	g7	h7	7
6	a6	b6	c6	d6	e6	f6	g6	h6	6
5	a5	b5	c5	d5	e5	f5	g5	h5	5
4	a4	b4	c4	d4	e4	f4	g4	h4	4
3	a3	b3 white pawn	c3 white pawn	d3	e3	f3 white pawn	g3 white pawn	h3	3
2	a2 white pawn	b2 white upside-down pawn	c2 white upside-down pawn	d2 white pawn	e2 white pawn	f2 white upside-down pawn	g2 white upside-down pawn	h2 white pawn	2
1	a1 white king	b1 N l	c1 white bishop	d1 white bishop	e1 white rook	f1 white princess	g1 white empress	h1 white queen	1
	a	b	c	d	e	f	g	h

Wolf chess gameboard and starting position. For this diagram: nightriders are represented by inverted knights; sergeants are represented by inverted pawns. Wolves start on squares g1/b10; foxes start on f1/c10.

Wolf chess (German: Wolf-Schach) is a chess variant invented by Dr. Arno von Wilpert in 1943. It is played on an 8×10 chessboard and employs several fairy pieces including wolf and fox – compound pieces popular in chess variants and known by different names.

Wolf chess correspondence matches and tournaments have been held, one of which (Paris vs. Augsburg, September 1960) is claimed to be the first international over-the-board match for a chess variant.

== Game rules ==
As in standard chess, White moves first and the winning objective is checkmate. The king, queen, rook, bishops, and pawns move and capture the same as they do in chess. In addition, there are some special rules.

=== Special rules ===
- The wolf moves and captures as a chess rook and a chess knight.
- The fox moves and captures as a chess bishop and a chess knight.
- The nightrider moves and captures as a chess knight extended to make any number of steps in the same direction in a straight line.
- A sergeant moves and captures one step straight or diagonally forward. A sergeant has the option, like a chess pawn, to move a double-step straight forward (but not diagonally) on its first move.
- A pawn (but not a sergeant) may capture an enemy pawn or sergeant en passant.
- Pawns and sergeants promote on the last rank to: queen, wolf, fox, rook, bishop, or nightrider. Pawns (but not sergeants) have an additional option of promoting to elephant (also called amazon rider in pocket mutation chess). The elephant piece is not present in the starting setup; it moves and captures as a chess queen and a nightrider (i.e. stronger than an amazon).
- There is no castling in wolf chess.
