= Ralph Betza =

American chess player (born 1945)

Personal information
- Born: April 16, 1945 (age 81)

Chess career
- Country: United States
- Title: FIDE Master (1989)
- Peak rating: 2340 (January 1986)

Ralph Betza (born April 16, 1945) is a FIDE Master and inventor of chess variants such as chess with different armies, Avalanche chess, and Way of the Knight.

Betza was a user of the website The Chess Variant Pages, on which several chess related works of his can be found. These include the rules of his chess variants, his article on his funny notation, and articles about the value of fairy chess pieces.

== Invented chess variants ==
- Multiplayer chess (date unknown)
- High-low chess (1968)
- Strange relay chess (1970s)
- Coordinate chess (or Co-chess) (1973)
- Conversion chess (1973)
- Co-relay chess (1973)
- Double conversion chess (1973)
- Heterocoalescence chess (1973) by Philip Cohen, based on an idea by Betza
- Inverter chess (or Switch chess) (1973)
- Metamorphosis (c. 1973)
- Pinwheel chess (1973)
- Reversion conversion chess (1973)
- Transportation chess (or Transchess) (1973)
- Watergate chess (1973)
- Weak! (1973)
- Biflux chess (1974) a variant of Co-chess
- Brownian motion chess (1974)
- Cassandra chess (1974)
- Orbital chess (1974)
- Overloader/Restorer chess (O/R chess) (1974)
- Put-back transchess (1974)
- Almost chess (1977)
- Ambition chess (1977)
- Autorifle chess (1977) after Bill Rawlings
- Avalanche chess (1977)
- Blizzard chess (1977)
- Buzzard chess (1977)
- List chess (1977)
- Plague chess (1977) after S. Walker; variants are Biological Warfare chess, and Immunity
- Twinkle chess (1977)
- Very Scottish chess (1977)
- Ghostrider chess (1978)
- Incognito chess (1978)
- Liars' chess (1978)
- Tutti-Frutti chess (1978) with Philip Cohen
- Chess with different armies (or Betza's chess, or Equal Armies) (1979)
- Suction chess (1979)
- One-shot chess (1980)
- Swarm chess (1980)
- Koopa chess (1990)
- Way Of The Knight (WOTN) (1992)
- Chess on a really big board (or Four Board chess, or chess on Four Boards) (1996)
- Earthquake chess (1996)
- Narrow chess (1996)
- Taxi chess (1996)
- Trapdoor chess (1996)
- The Game of Nemoroth (2002)

== See also ==
- Betza's funny notation
