= Philip M. Cohen =

Inventor of chess variants

Philip M. Cohen is the inventor of several chess variants. He authored the column "Olla Podrida" in the periodical Nost-algia published by the (now defunct) correspondence game club NOST. (Note: NOST (kNights of the Square Table), formed in 1960 by Bob Lauzon and Jim France, held an annual convention and enjoyed several hundred active members.) The column regularly featured chess variants, many experimental, since 1972.

== Reincarnation Chess ==
This variant by Cohen uses the same board and pieces as standard chess, but a captured piece can make its presence felt on the board as a zombie, and can "reincarnate" another zombie back into the game by capturing it.

=== Move rules ===
When a capture (or series of captures) takes place on a square, a zombie is created when the capturing piece leaves the square. The zombie assumes the same piece type as the (last) piece captured, and the color of the capturing player.

- Zombies cannot capture normal pieces or move through them.
- Normal pieces cannot capture zombies or move through them.
- Zombies can capture or move through other zombies.
- Reincarnation: When a zombie (or series of zombies) is captured on a square, a normal piece is created when the capturing zombie leaves the square. The normal piece assumes the same piece type as the (last) zombie captured, and the color of the capturing player.
- Zombie pawns promote to zombie pieces and retain their piece type if reincarnated.
- Pieces reborn on their starting squares regain their usual privileges (the pawn's initial two-square advance; the rook's eligibility to castle).

There is no en passant capture in Reincarnation Chess.

== Variants invented ==
- Null Chess (1960s)
- Zombie Chess (1964), a variant is Dying Zombie Chess
- Reincarnation Chess (1960s), a development of Zombie Chess
- Ricochet Chess (1968)
- Free Megarotation Chess (presumed 1969)
- Free Rotation Chess (1969), a variant of Actuated Revolving Centre (ARC) Chess by A. E. Farebrother and W. H. Rawlings (1937)
- Restricted Rotation Chess (presumed 1969)
- Rotation Chess or Gumption Chess (1969)
- Slippery Centre Chess (c. 1970)
- Crossings Chess (1973), an adaptation to chess of Robert Abbott's game Crossings
- Heterocoalescence Chess (1973), a variant of Coordinate Chess (Co-Chess) based on an idea by Ralph Betza
- Nemesis Chess (1973)
- Surge Chess (1973), a variant of Crossings Chess
- Parton Chess (1974), in honor of V. R. Parton
- Merger Chess (1975)
- Cohen's Error Chess (1977)
- Tutti-Frutti Chess (1978), with Ralph Betza
- Very Slippery Centre Chess (1978), a variant of Slippery Centre Chess
- Archimedes Chess (1979), after Scott Marley
- Mixture Chess (1979)
- Ninerider Chess (1979)
- Nuisance Chess (1979), a variant of Coordinate Chess (Co-Chess) by Ralph Betza (1973)
- Blood-Brother Chess (1980), with R. Wayne Schmittberger
- Fast-Track Chess (1986)
- Reciprocal Chess (1990s)
- Ur Chess (1997)
