= Capablanca chess =

Chess variant using two new chessmen

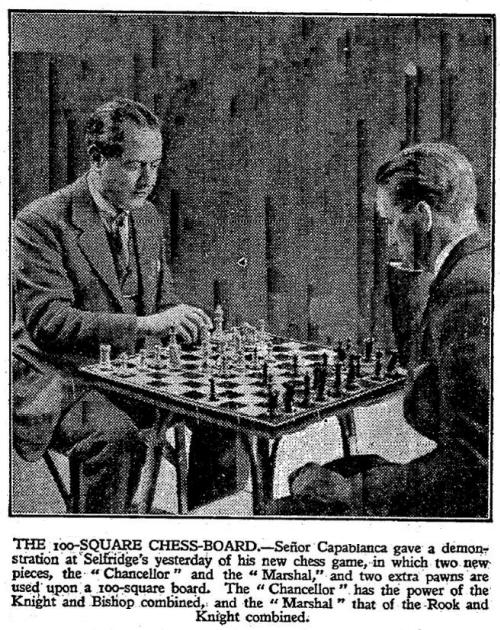
Capablanca demonstrating Capablanca chess on a 10×10 board as reported in a 1929 April issue of The Times

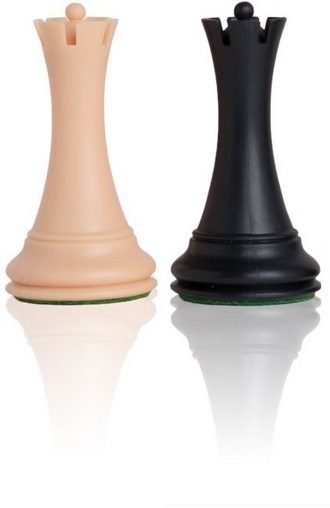
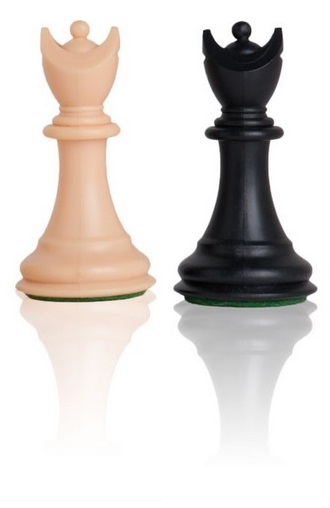
One Staunton style design for the chancellor (left) and archbishop (right) knighted chessmen

Capablanca chess, also called Knighted chess, is a family of over twenty Western chess variants which incorporate two new pieces. The family includes Capablanca chess (usually played on a 10×8 board, but Capablanca preferred a 10×10 board), Seirawan chess (on a 8×8 board), Embassy chess, Grand chess (10×10 board), and Gothic chess. The two new pieces combine the powers of knight with that of bishop or rook, hence the term "knighted chess" as used by Cazaux & Knowlton.

The new compound pieces are the archbishop or princess which combines moves of a bishop and a knight, and the chancellor or empress which combines moves of a rook and a knight. These new pieces (which go by various other names depending on the variant) allow new strategies and possibilities that provide an interesting change to the game of chess while also retaining the original style and aesthetic. For example, the archbishop by itself can checkmate a lone king in a corner (when placed diagonally with one square in between). A few variants also add another compound piece, the amazon (queen+knight).

The first knighted chess variant was introduced by Italian chess player Pietro Carrera in his 1617 book Il Gioco de gli Scacchi (The Game of Chess). Various similar games appear throughout the 18th and 19th centuries with the new knighted pieces. In the 20th century, World Chess Champion José Raúl Capablanca (1888–1942) also promoted a knighted chess variant now called Capablanca chess. Capablanca was concerned with how high-level chess was overly reliant on extensive memorization and study of chess openings and their variations. He feared that eventually most high-level games would end in draws because of this. This threat of "draw death" for chess was his main motivation for developing and promoting a new chess variant. Later board game designers like Christian Freeling also attempted to promote different knighted chess variants.

Several chess grandmasters played and commented on knighted chess variants throughout the 20th century. Alexander Alekhine is reported to have played Neo-chess. The American grandmaster Yasser Seirawan designed his own variant to be played on a standard chessboard (Seirawan chess). The Soviet grandmaster Victor Korchnoi is known to have enjoyed playing Janus Chess, and is quoted as having said "I like playing Janus Chess because one can show more creativity than in normal chess."

== Early variants ==
=== Carrera's chess ===
	a	b	c	d	e	f	g	h	i	j
8	a8 black rook	b8 black princess	c8 black knight	d8 black bishop	e8 black queen	f8 black king	g8 black bishop	h8 black knight	i8 black empress	j8 black rook	8
7	a7 black pawn	b7 black pawn	c7 black pawn	d7 black pawn	e7 black pawn	f7 black pawn	g7 black pawn	h7 black pawn	i7 black pawn	j7 black pawn	7
6	a6	b6	c6	d6	e6	f6	g6	h6	i6	j6	6
5	a5	b5	c5	d5	e5	f5	g5	h5	i5	j5	5
4	a4	b4	c4	d4	e4	f4	g4	h4	i4	j4	4
3	a3	b3	c3	d3	e3	f3	g3	h3	i3	j3	3
2	a2 white pawn	b2 white pawn	c2 white pawn	d2 white pawn	e2 white pawn	f2 white pawn	g2 white pawn	h2 white pawn	i2 white pawn	j2 white pawn	2
1	a1 white rook	b1 white princess	c1 white knight	d1 white bishop	e1 white queen	f1 white king	g1 white bishop	h1 white knight	i1 white empress	j1 white rook	1
	a	b	c	d	e	f	g	h	i	j

Carrera's chess. Earliest chess variant on 8×10 board with archbishop and chancellor.

Position: e8 black cross, e7 black cross, d6 black circle, e6 black cross, f6 black circle, c5 black circle, e5 black cross, g5 black circle, a4 black cross, b4 black cross, c4 black cross, d4 black cross, e4 white chancellor, f4 black cross, g4 black cross, h4 black cross, c3 black circle, e3 black cross, g3 black circle, d2 black circle, e2 black cross, f2 black circle, e1 black cross

Maximum range of a chancellor (R+N) on an empty board

Position: a8 black cross, b7 black cross, h7 black cross, c6 black cross, d6 black circle, f6 black circle, g6 black cross, c5 black circle, d5 black cross, f5 black cross, g5 black circle, e4 white archbishop, c3 black circle, d3 black cross, f3 black cross, g3 black circle, c2 black cross, d2 black circle, f2 black circle, g2 black cross, b1 black cross, h1 black cross

Maximum range of an archbishop (B+N) on an empty board

In 1617, the Syracusan priest and chess player Pietro Carrera (1573–1647) published a book Il Gioco degli Scacchi (The Game of Chess), which contained a description of a chess variant played on an 8×10 board, which he appears to be using for the purpose of conserving the classical chess structure while inserting the new pieces. He placed new pieces between a rook and a knight. Carrera called them the campione ("champion", called the chancellor in Capablanca chess) and centauro ("centaur", archbishop in Capablanca chess). The "champion" combines the movement of the rook and knight while the centaur combines the bishop and knight movements. Of these, the new piece Chess ideally wants is the weaker centaur, having it that pawns are easier to get out of the way of diagonals than to get out of the way of files.

The centaur was placed on the queenside and champion on the kingside, these being pieces which he appears to have invented for the purpose of the book, between which the centaur that combines the bishop and knight movements appears more clearly to be his invention, as he mentions previously odds where the weaker player’s king or queen has the knight’s move and it is logical to assume he might merely have overlooked the usage of odds where the weaker player’s (queen’s) rook has the knight’s move as a weaker version of the Amazon odds.

His likely primary motivation for the design was either the limitations of opening theory in this time or that he was just following the logic of Pedro Damiano and Ruy López de Segura that already assumed the logic of chess playing out to the game being about the second player’s response to the King’s or queen’s pawn opening, and even deeper, the first player’s response to the second’s immediate defense against them establishing the ideal pawn center, to its inevitable conclusion or that he considered it improper to play with a fairy piece, specifically a royal crowned Knight, merely by way of handicap and he was not as concerned with avoiding structural weaknesses in the new game’s starting position created by a potential new piece standing on a given file, as with the archbishop between the knight and the rook leaving its own pawn unprotected.

Carrera used the names Centauro (centaur) instead of archbishop, and Campione (champion) instead of chancellor. Coincidentally, he could have placed the doubleton of Italian or Spanish Draughts, games which he even mentioned in passing in course of discussing the origin of chess, between the knight and the rook and left the new piece’s pawn unprotected from anything but itself, thus improving marginally upon placing the archbishop there. Though he was a good chess theoretician, he appears strangely unconcerned about the theoretical benefits and detriments of each possible setup, and the major theoretical detriment of the setup he chose is that the archbishop is thus mainly important to the opening theory of the game in the negative sense that it is necessary to get it out of the way of queenside castling, that is, when playing his variant adapted to modern rules.

=== Other early variants ===
Another early knighted chess variant was played in 18th century India. This "Hyderabad decimal chess" was first described in a 1790s manuscript from Hyderabad. It was later described in Murray’s 1913 History of Chess (pp. 346-347). The game included three new knighted pieces: one wazir (bishop+knight), one zurāfa (queen+knight) and two dabbābas (rook+knight) and was played on a 10×10 board.

The 19th century saw further similar variants with extra pieces developed. Das Schachspiel, seine Gattungen und Abarten (The Game of Chess, its Types and Varieties, 1840) by Ludwig Tressau of Leipzig, the first modern book on chess variants, discusses two similar chess variants with knighted pieces: Kaiserspiel and Sultanspiel. Kaiserspiel was played on a 10×10 board with two additional pieces, one commander (queen+knight) and one adjutant” (bishop+knight). Sultanspiel meanwhile expanded the board to 11×11 and added the marshal (rook+knight).

	a	b	c	d	e	f	g	h	i	j
8	a8 black rook	b8 black knight	c8 black bishop	d8 black empress	e8 black queen	f8 black king	g8 black princess	h8 black bishop	i8 black knight	j8 black rook	8
7	a7 black pawn	b7 black pawn	c7 black pawn	d7 black pawn	e7 black pawn	f7 black pawn	g7 black pawn	h7 black pawn	i7 black pawn	j7 black pawn	7
6	a6	b6	c6	d6	e6	f6	g6	h6	i6	j6	6
5	a5	b5	c5	d5	e5	f5	g5	h5	i5	j5	5
4	a4	b4	c4	d4	e4	f4	g4	h4	i4	j4	4
3	a3	b3	c3	d3	e3	f3	g3	h3	i3	j3	3
2	a2 white pawn	b2 white pawn	c2 white pawn	d2 white pawn	e2 white pawn	f2 white pawn	g2 white pawn	h2 white pawn	i2 white pawn	j2 white pawn	2
1	a1 white rook	b1 white knight	c1 white bishop	d1 white empress	e1 white queen	f1 white king	g1 white princess	h1 white bishop	i1 white knight	j1 white rook	1
	a	b	c	d	e	f	g	h	i	j

Bird's chess. Second chess variant on 8×10 board with archbishop and chancellor.

In 1874, the English chess player Henry Bird (known as the inventor of the f4 Bird's Opening) proposed a further variant on Carrera's game in an issue of the City of London Chess Magazine. The only significant difference was the opening setup. The new pieces were now between the bishops and the royal pair, the archbishop close to the king, the chancellor close to the queen. The queen's bishop's pawn is not protected in the initial setup. Bird used the names equerry instead of archbishop, and guard instead of chancellor. The theoretical benefit of this setup is that the new pieces’ pawns are thus very important to the opening theory of the game, equally to the king’s and queen's pawns. This makes the chancellor‘s pawn a pair for the queen's pawn as leading to a more strategically oriented game from the nature of the chancellor.

There were also various other lesser known European chess variants that also slightly enlarged the board and introduced knighted pieces. One of these was a chess variant introduced by John Manners, 3rd Duke of Rutland (1696–1779), which used a 10×14 squares board with the following extra pieces: the concubine (combines rook and knight), two crowned rooks (rooks with the added power of taking a diagonal step), two extra bishops, an extra knight, and six extra pawns. This game became popular among several leading players of the time like André Danican Philidor and Abraham Janssen.

The chancellor piece also appeared in Benjamin R. Foster's chancellor chess variant played on a 9×9 board. First publicized in the St. Louis Globe-Democrat (12 February 1887), which states that the invention "created a furore in the chess world heretofore unknown." Foster published a booklet promoting and explaining the game in 1889.

== Capablanca chess ==
The Cuban chess master José Raúl Capablanca (1888–1942) also promoted his own "Capablanca chess" (or Capablanca's chess) variant in a series of talks, interviews and articles. These suggestions appeared as early as a 1926 article in the Cuban Revista Bimestre Cubana. Capablanca chess attracted some attention due to its promotion by one of the world's greatest chess players at the time, but it still failed to reach widespread popularity.

The main impulse behind Capablanca's promotion of this variant was his belief that high-level chess was becoming too reliant on memorization and "encyclopedic knowledge" of chess openings and positions. Capablanca feared that this would eventually lead to most high-level games ending in forced draws or at least becoming too reliant on following prepared opening variations learned by rote. This concern was also shared by his friend Emanuel Lasker according to Lasker's own Mein Wettkampf mit Capablanca.

Capablanca proposed two opening setups for Capablanca chess. His final revision placed the archbishop between the queen's knight and queen's bishop; the chancellor between the king's knight and king's bishop.

	a	b	c	d	e	f	g	h	i	j
8	a8 black rook	b8 black knight	c8 black princess	d8 black bishop	e8 black queen	f8 black king	g8 black bishop	h8 black empress	i8 black knight	j8 black rook	8
7	a7 black pawn	b7 black pawn	c7 black pawn	d7 black pawn	e7 black pawn	f7 black pawn	g7 black pawn	h7 black pawn	i7 black pawn	j7 black pawn	7
6	a6	b6	c6	d6	e6	f6	g6	h6	i6	j6	6
5	a5	b5	c5	d5	e5	f5	g5	h5	i5	j5	5
4	a4	b4	c4	d4	e4	f4	g4	h4	i4	j4	4
3	a3	b3	c3	d3	e3	f3	g3	h3	i3	j3	3
2	a2 white pawn	b2 white pawn	c2 white pawn	d2 white pawn	e2 white pawn	f2 white pawn	g2 white pawn	h2 white pawn	i2 white pawn	j2 white pawn	2
1	a1 white rook	b1 white knight	c1 white princess	d1 white bishop	e1 white queen	f1 white king	g1 white bishop	h1 white empress	i1 white knight	j1 white rook	1
	a	b	c	d	e	f	g	h	i	j

Capablanca chess starting setup. The archbishops are on c1/c8; the chancellors are on h1/h8.

In Capablanca chess, the king moves three squares when castling instead of moving two squares as in standard chess. A pawn can promote to archbishop or chancellor in addition to the regular promotion options in standard chess. Unlike orthodox chess, each king, instead of each queen, starts on a square of its own color (the white king on a light square; the black king on a dark square).

Capablanca initially experimented with a 10×10 board size with a different initial setup and where pawns could advance up to three squares on their first move. After some later play-testing however, he also promoted a variant on a 10×8 board. Edward Lasker wrote:

... I played many test games with Capablanca, and they rarely lasted more than twenty or twenty-five moves. We tried boards of 10×10 squares and 10×8 squares, and we concluded that the latter was preferable because hand-to-hand fights start earlier on it.

Lasker was one of the few supporters of this new variant and he helped play-test the game with Capablanca. Hungarian grandmaster Géza Maróczy also played some games with Capablanca (who got the better of him). British champion William Winter thought that there were too many strong pieces, making the minor pieces less relevant. Capablanca's proposition was also criticized by other contemporary chess players in print, including Max Euwe and Siegbert Tarrasch. The debate was carried out in newspapers like the Manchester Guardian.

The new piece names archbishop (Spanish: arzobispo, originally named chancellor) and chancellor (Spanish: canciller, originally named marshall, followed by marshal) were introduced by Capablanca himself. These names are still used in most modern variants of Capablanca Chess.

== Post-Capablanca variants ==
Grandmaster Susan Polgar playing Gothic chess (a version of Capablanca chess) with Ed Trice

The knighted chess family continued to add new variants well into the late 20th century. There are different types of knighted chess variants. One class of variants use the regular 8×8 chessboard of 64 squares, while another category uses larger non-standard board sizes or types (10×10 or 10×8). Apart from these changes, most variants do not change the standard rules of chess.

There have been numerous attempts to modify and improve on Capablanca chess. Most of these add relatively minor changes, such as changing the starting positions. Various game designers and chess players have commented on how the starting position of Capablanca's original variant leave the pawns on the i file undefended, creating a significant weakness that can be exploited. Because of this, several chess variants postdating Capablanca chess were designed with initial arrangements where all pawns are protected by at least one piece; these include Universal chess, Grand Chess, Embassy chess, Trice's chess, Grotesque chess, Ladorean chess, Schoolbook chess, and Univers chess. The creators of these variants felt that leaving any pawn undefended in the initial setup created an easily exploitable weakness that needed to be resolved.

=== List of standard board variants ===
	a	b	c	d	e	f	g	h
8	a8 black empress	b8 black knight	c8 black bishop	d8 A d	e8 black king	f8 black queen	g8 black princess	h8 black rook	8
7	a7 black pawn	b7 black pawn	c7 black pawn	d7 black pawn	e7 black pawn	f7 black pawn	g7 black pawn	h7 black pawn	7
6	a6	b6	c6	d6	e6	f6	g6	h6	6
5	a5	b5	c5	d5	e5	f5	g5	h5	5
4	a4	b4	c4	d4	e4	f4	g4	h4	4
3	a3	b3	c3	d3	e3	f3	g3	h3	3
2	a2 white pawn	b2 white pawn	c2 white pawn	d2 white pawn	e2 white pawn	f2 white pawn	g2 white pawn	h2 white pawn	2
1	a1 white empress	b1 white knight	c1 white bishop	d1 A l	e1 white king	f1 white queen	g1 white princess	h1 white rook	1
	a	b	c	d	e	f	g	h

Tutti-frutti chess, starting position

Variants which rely on the standard 8×8 chessboard include the following:

- Neo-chess (1923) by Hugo Legler (on an 8×8 board), replaces the knight on b1/b8 with an archbishop, and the rook a1/a8 with the chancellor.
- Coronation chess created by Frank Maus in the 1920s added the knighted pieces by a specific move called coronation which consists of moving a basic piece (rook, bishop, or knight) into the square of another to merge them into a combined stronger piece that unified their powers. Maus coined the terms empress for rook+knight and princess for bishop+knight, names which were adopted by numerous later chess problemists.
- Wolf Chess by Von Wilpert (1959) which introduces replaces one rook with a "wolf" (R+N) and replaces both knights with a "fox" (B+N) and a nightrider (a knight slider). It also adds four extra powerful pawns ("sergeants").
- Tutti-frutti chess (1978) by Ralph Betza and Philip Cohen which replaces queen's rooks with empresses (rook+knight), queens with amazons, king's bishops with queens and the king's knights with princesses (bishop+knight).
- Seirawan chess (or S-Chess) by Yasser Seirawan and Bruce Harper begins with the classic chess setup, and the extra pieces are retained in hand and introduced as the game progresses and back rank squares are vacated.
- Superchess or Exchess (Dutch: Superschaak) by Henk van Haeringen (1999), which introduces several new pieces, including empress, princess, and amazon, and the players agree before hand on the starting lineup by replacing some (or all) of the standard chess pieces with some of the new pieces. Pawns may also be replaced with new types of pawns.
- Musketeer chess, which expands on Seirawan chess by allowing players to select two extra pieces from an expanded pool of fairy chess pieces.

=== List of larger board variants ===
Variants which use larger boards include:

- Universal chess (1928) by Dr. Bruno Violet (on 10×10 board). He proposed two starting army arrangements.
- Supercapablanca chess (Savio Cagliostro, 1973), played on a 12×8 board, the extra pieces are two archbishops, a chancellor and a General (queen+knight)
- Janus Chess (1978) by Werner Schöndorf a commercial game using a 10×8 board with extra pieces called januses (bishop+knight); extra pieces are Januses (B+N). Originally marketed as "Super-Chess".
- Grand chess (1984) by Christian Freeling which uses a 10×10 board and moves the starting line for most of the armies one rank forward (except the rooks). There is no castling.
- Modern chess by Gabriel Vicente Maura (9×9 board)
- Gothic chess (2000-2002, later renamed Trice's chess) by Edward A. Trice, which uses 10×8 board
- Aberg's variation (2003) by Hans Aberg (10×8)
- Grotesque chess (2004) by Fergus Duniho
- Capablanca Chess, Paulowich Variant (2004) by David Paulovich, which was included in the computer program ChessV. This setup was also reinvented independently by John K. Lewis as Victorian chess (2007).
- Ladorean chess (2005) by Bernhard U. Hermes
- Embassy chess (2005) by Kevin Hill which uses a starting position identical to Grand Chess on a 10×8 board
- Univers chess (2006) by Fergus Duniho adopts the starting lineup of Universal chess on a 10×8 board
- Schoolbook chess (2006) by Sam Trenholme
- Capablanca random chess (2004) by Reinhard Scharnagl
- Modern Capablanca random chess (2008) by José Carrillo
- Gliński–Capablanca Chess, which combines Gliński's hexagonal chess with Capablanca chess

Some variants of knighted chess only adopt one knighted piece, not both. One example of this is Chancellor chess, which only uses knighted rook (chancellor) and is played on a 9×9 board. Another example is Puerto Rican chess player Gabriel Vicente Maura's modern chess (c. 1968) which only uses the prime minister (bishop+knight).

=== Large board variants ===
a1 white rook	b1 white bishop	c1 white queen	d1 white knight	e1 white king	f1 white empress	g1 white knight	h1 white princess	i1 white bishop	j1 white rook

Grotesque chess opening setup

a1 white rook	b1 white bishop	c1 white knight	d1 white empress	e1 white queen	f1 white king	g1 white princess	h1 white knight	i1 white bishop	j1 white rook

Univers chess opening setup

a1 white rook	b1 white bishop	c1 white queen	d1 white knight	e1 white king	f1 white princess	g1 white knight	h1 white empress	i1 white bishop	j1 white rook

Ladorean chess setup

a1 white rook	b1 white knight	c1 white bishop	d1 white queen	e1 white king	f1 white empress	g1 white princess	h1 white bishop	i1 white knight	j1 white rook

Embassy chess setup

a1 white rook	b1 white queen	c1 white knight	d1 white bishop	e1 white princess	f1 white king	g1 white bishop	h1 white knight	i1 white empress	j1 white rook

Schoolbook Chess

a1 white rook	b1 white knight	c1 white bishop	d1 white queen	e1 white empress	f1 white king	g1 white princess	h1 white bishop	i1 white knight	j1 white rook

Gothic Chess

	a	b	c	d	e	f	g	h	i	j
10	a10 black rook	b10	c10	d10	e10	f10	g10	h10	i10	j10 black rook	10
9	a9	b9 black knight	c9 black bishop	d9 black queen	e9 black king	f9 black empress	g9 black princess	h9 black bishop	i9 black knight	j9	9
8	a8 black pawn	b8 black pawn	c8 black pawn	d8 black pawn	e8 black pawn	f8 black pawn	g8 black pawn	h8 black pawn	i8 black pawn	j8 black pawn	8
7	a7	b7	c7	d7	e7	f7	g7	h7	i7	j7	7
6	a6	b6	c6	d6	e6	f6	g6	h6	i6	j6	6
5	a5	b5	c5	d5	e5	f5	g5	h5	i5	j5	5
4	a4	b4	c4	d4	e4	f4	g4	h4	i4	j4	4
3	a3 white pawn	b3 white pawn	c3 white pawn	d3 white pawn	e3 white pawn	f3 white pawn	g3 white pawn	h3 white pawn	i3 white pawn	j3 white pawn	3
2	a2	b2 white knight	c2 white bishop	d2 white queen	e2 white king	f2 white empress	g2 white princess	h2 white bishop	i2 white knight	j2	2
1	a1 white rook	b1	c1	d1	e1	f1	g1	h1	i1	j1 white rook	1
	a	b	c	d	e	f	g	h	i	j

Grand Chess starting setup. Marshals are on f2/f9; cardinals are on g2/g9.

Chess variants played on larger boards have a long history. Examples include the Arabic shatranj al-tamma (10×10) and Courier chess (12×8). Numerous knighted chess variants adopt larger boards following Capablanca's lead. One of these adaptations, Gothic chess (later renamed Trice's chess) was patented in 2002 and promoted by American chess player Ed Trice and saw some commercial development in the early 2000s; specialized chess sets were created. In 2004, the Gothic Chess Computer World Championship was held. Trice claimed to have found the ideal starting position which avoided several flaws in previous variants of Capablanca chess.

Hungarian-American grandmaster Susan Polgar played some Trice chess matches, and in 2006 there was an attempt to arrange a match between Fischer and Anatoly Karpov in this variant, but this never took place.

A few other variants have also seen some wider play. For example, Christian Freeling's Grand chess was played in a 1996 tournament in Armenia. It was also a common feature of American magazine Abstract Games in the early 2000s. Grand chess is also discussed in Schmittberger's New Rules for Classic Games (1992), and in Pritchard's Encyclopedia of Chess Variants.

=== Maura's Modern chess ===
Maura's modern chess, which was introduced in his 1980 Evolución del Ajedrez, attracted a significant following in the Spanish-speaking world, especially in Puerto Rico (where a club dedicated to it was opened), as well as in Latin America and in Spain. Chess sets for this variant were manufactured, and various events were organized. The first international match was held in 1972 between Puerto Rico and the U.S. Virgin Islands.

An organization for the game was also founded, the Federación Mundial de Ajedrez Moderno (FEMDAM), which had delegates from 16 countries. Tournaments were held throughout the 70s, but events ceased in 1983 and FEMDAM was eventually dissolved when Maura fell ill.

=== Seirawan chess ===
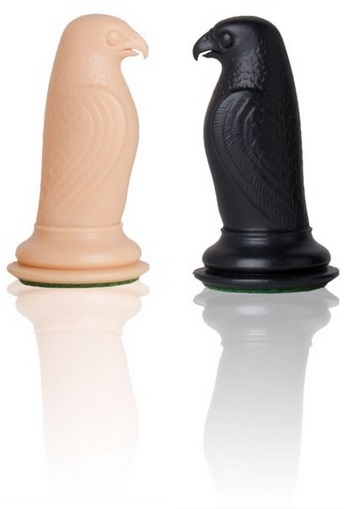
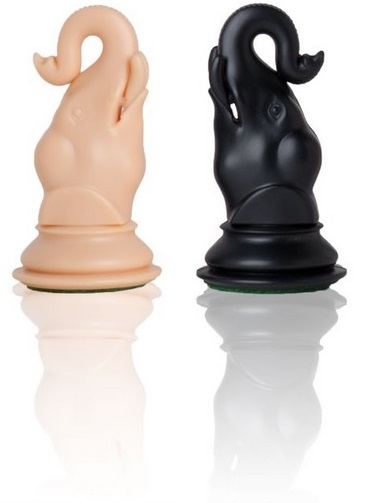
Staunton style designs for the hawk and elephant

Seirawan chess (or S-Chess) is a Capablanca chess variant by Yasser Seirawan and Bruce Harper that uses a standard 8×8 chess board. The initial position is that of standard chess. Each side has the additional two knighted pieces in hand, which are called a hawk (archbishop ) and an elephant (chancellor) in Seirawan Chess.

When notating games in algebraic notation, the letter E is used for the elephant and H for the hawk. If the player places one of the two pieces on the board, it is written after a slash. For example, 1. Nc3/E means that the player moved his knight from b1 to c3 and placed the elephant on b1.

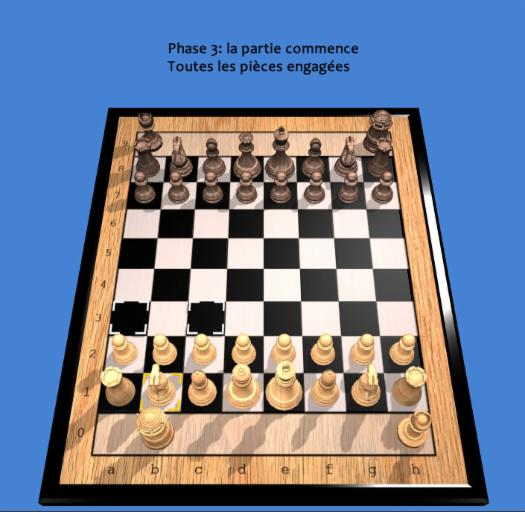
Musketeer chess is an expanded S-chess with several more fairy pieces available for pre-game selection that can be introduced into the game from a storage row.

The elephant and the hawk are introduced to the game in the following way: whenever the player moves a piece (king, queen, knight, bishop or rook) from its starting position (that hasn't already been moved), one of the pieces in hand may be placed immediately on the square just vacated. One cannot use the placing of an elephant or hawk to block check. If the player moves all his pieces from the first rank without placing one or both in hand pieces, he forfeits the right to do so. After castling, the player may put one of the pieces in hand on either the king's or the rook's square, but he may not place both pieces in hand in the same turn. Pawns may promote to a hawk or an elephant in this game (in addition to the normal chess pieces).

=== Capablanca variants with different rules ===
Capablanca random chess applies the concept of Chess960 / Fischerandom to Capablanca chess. The starting setup is arranged as per Chess960 rules, but also includes the following additional restrictions:

- All pawns in the starting positions must be protected by at least one piece.
- Bishops cannot start on neighboring squares.
- The queen and the archbishop must start on opposite-colored squares.
- The starting position cannot be that of Gothic chess.

In total, there are 12,118 starting positions in Capablanca random chess.

"Capahouse" similarly applies the drop rule from crazyhouse to Capablanca chess. The rules are as in Capablanca chess except the following new rules:

- Drops resulting in immediate checkmate are permitted. This includes pawn drops.
- Pawns may not be dropped on the 1st or 8th ranks.
- Pawns that have been promoted and later captured must dropped as normal pawns.
- Dropped white and black pawns on the 2nd and 7th ranks, respectively, may make a two-square move as their first move after the drop.
- Dropped rooks cannot castle.

== Strategy ==
Seirawan and Harper wrote the following regarding the changes in strategy in their Seirawan chess:

the placement of the pieces on squares vacated by the existing pieces changes the game and creates innumerable possibilities which render all existing opening theory open to reexamination and opens up many new possibilities as well. Players who understand the principles of opening play will do well, while players who rely primarily on memorizing variations will find themselves in trouble.

Ed Thrice and his colleagues in the Gothic chess community pioneered various theories and openings for this Capablanca variant in the 2000s. According to Thrice,

Initially, we played many games by opening with 1. f4 which is the functional equivalent of 1. e4 in older 8×8 chess. Later, 1. d4 become more fashionable, but not for the corresponding reason to the liaison opening in regular chess. It is more flexible, tends not to "hem in" either Bishop, and allows White the opportunity to initiate the first real threat in the game. Lately, National Master John Vehre and Ed Trice pioneered the 1. g4 line, referred to as The Spike opening. That opening is the most aggressive, offers the greatest scope for original play, and is one of the most complicated ways to create middlegame tactical shootouts.

== Piece values ==
H. G. Muller suggested the following estimated piece values for 8×10 Capablanca chess pieces:

Pawn	1
Knight	3
Bishop	3.5 (+0.5 for the bishop pair)
Rook	5
Archbishop	8.75
Chancellor	9
Queen	9.5

Edward Trice meanwhile gave the following values for the pieces, again on an 8×10 board:

Pawn	1.00
Knight	2.50
Bishop	3.00
Rook	4.75
Archbishop	6.75
Chancellor	8.25
Queen	8.75

Regarding the much higher value Muller gives for the archbishop, he notes the large number of orthogonal contacts in its move pattern, with 16 such contacts for the archbishop compared to 8 for the chancellor and queen each: such orthogonal contacts would explain why even in cylindrical chess, the rook is still stronger than the bishop even though they now have the same mobility. This makes the archbishop extremely good at annihilating pawn chains, because it can attack a pawn as well as the square in front of it. This does not appear to have much to do with the bishop's colourboundedness being masked in the compound, because adding a non-capturing backward step turns out to benefit the bishop about as much as the knight; and it also does not have much to do with the bishop's lack of mating potential being so masked, because adding a backward step (capturing and non-capturing) to the bishop benefits it about as much as adding such a step to the knight as well. Muller's value is surprising, since the lone rook is much more valuable than the lone bishop, but is backed up by empirical computer studies.

These values would be different in variants with different board sizes and configurations however. On larger boards, bishops gain in value, because both of its forward moves become likely to attack the enemy camp. Thus in 8×10 Capablanca chess variants, two bishops are clearly superior to two knights, and closer in value to two knights plus pawn.

There is in addition a strong "leveling effect": the strong pieces (archbishop, chancellor, and queen) cannot display their superiority against a large number of weaker pieces, because the weaker pieces can restrict them. For example, a queen attacked by a knight must usually move to avoid capture, and cannot rely on being defended; but a knight attacked by a queen need not fear. Thus sacrificing a strong piece for rook and minor, or three minor pieces, can give significant compensation (greater than a pawn) because it increases the value of one's remaining strong pieces relative to the opponent's.

== Programs that play knighted chess variants ==
- ChessV
- Fairy-Max
- Zillions of Games
- Fairy Stockfish
- Chess Remix

== Web sites that play knighted chess variants ==
- Chess.com
- EvoChess
- Green Chess
- Musketeer chess
- Pychess
