= Galleria Subalpina =

Building in Dunedin, New Zealand

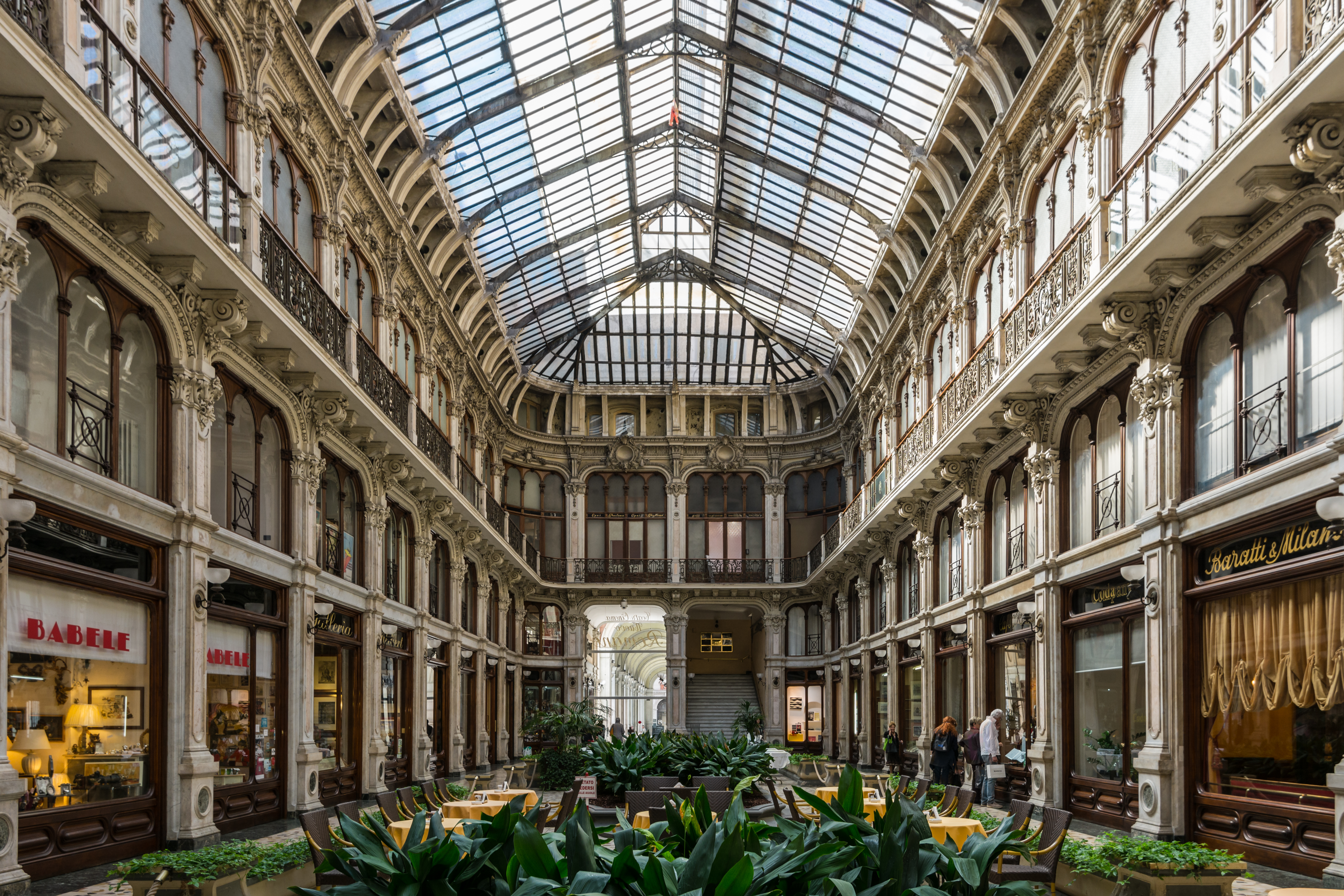
- Galleria Subalpina in 2015
- Location: Turin, Italy
- Coordinates: 45°4′10.16″N 7°41′11.36″E
- Opened: December 30, 1874; 151 years ago
- Architect: Pietro Carrera

The Galleria Subalpina is a historic shopping arcade in Turin, Italy.

== History ==
Designed by Pietro Carrera in 1873, construction began on June 25 of the same year, and the gallery was inaugurated on December 30, 1874. It takes its name from the Subalpine Industry Bank, which financed and oversaw the construction project.

The building was acquired by Blackstone as part of a broader €1.3 billion real estate transaction involving a portfolio of properties owned by Reale Compagnia Italiana. The acquisition marked the launch of a major refurbishment program focused on restoring the galleria's historic character while upgrading it for contemporary use.

== Description ==
The galleria is located between Piazza Castello and Piazza Carlo Alberto in central Turin. It is distinguished by a spacious, light-filled hall measuring fifty meters in length and fourteen in width, enriched by elaborate eclectic decorations belnding Renaissance and Baroque elements, created by the sculptor Edoardo Rubino. Its height of roughly eighteen meters is softened by a balcony running along the entire perimeter.

The vaulted ceiling stands as a true tribute to the modernity of the period, making extensive use of glass and wrought iron, as seen in the richly decorated structural elements crafted by the Loro brothers and Piattini.
