= Modern chess (disambiguation) =

Modern chess is a chess variant played on a 9×9 board.

Modern chess may also refer to:

- Modern Chess, a book series within the My Great Predecessors series written by Garry Kasparov
- Modern Chess Openings, a book by Richard Clewin Griffith and John Herbert White
