= Chess with different armies =

Chess variant with opposing armies of different composition

Chess with different armies (or Betza's Chess or Equal Armies) is a chess variant invented by Ralph Betza in 1979. Two sides use different sets of fairy pieces. There are several armies of equal strength to choose from, including the standard FIDE army. In all armies, kings and pawns are the same as in FIDE chess, but the four other pieces are different.

== Rules and armies ==
Before the game players choose their armies in a certain way, predefined by tournament rules. This can be done either randomly or secretly by both players. Each player has a choice of 4 armies: the Fabulous FIDEs, which are the standard chess pieces, the Colorbound Clobberers, the Nutty Knights, and the Remarkable Rookies.

All armies are designed to be equal in strength but have significantly different properties. Kings and pawns move the same as in chess for all armies. Pawns can only promote to pieces of either army on the board at the start. Castling is done as in standard chess with the exception of the case when the rook replacement is colorbound, like in the Colorbound Clobberers army. In the latter case, the king, when castling long, moves to b1, and the rook replacement to c1. This is so that colorbound pieces do not change square color.

a5	b5	c5	d5	e5
a4	b4 black circle	c4	d4 black circle	e4
a3	b3	c3 white bishop	d3	e3
a2	b2 black circle	c2	d2 black circle	e2
a1	b1	c1	d1	e1

Ferz (notation F).

a5 black circle	b5	c5	d5	e5 black circle
a4	b4	c4	d4	e4
a3	b3	c3 white bishop	d3	e3
a2	b2	c2	d2	e2
a1 black circle	b1	c1	d1	e1 black circle

Alfil (notation A), can jump.

a5	b5	c5	d5	e5
a4	b4	c4 black circle	d4	e4
a3	b3 black circle	c3 white upside-down rook	d3 black circle	e3
a2	b2	c2 black circle	d2	e2
a1	b1	c1	d1	e1

Wazir (notation W).

a5	b5	c5 black circle	d5	e5
a4	b4	c4	d4	e4
a3 black circle	b3	c3 white upside-down rook	d3	e3 black circle
a2	b2	c2	d2	e2
a1	b1	c1 black circle	d1	e1

Dabbaba (notation D), can jump.

Many pieces in the following armies are combinations of standard chess pieces and 4 fairy pieces: ferz, alfil, wazir and dabbaba (see their movement diagrams above). The game can be played with standard chess pieces, and the following move diagrams use standard pieces as well (except queens).

=== Colorbound Clobberers ===
In this army, rooks, knights, bishops, and queen are replaced by the following pieces:

Position: a8 up-left arrow, b7 up-left arrow, h7 up-right arrow, c6 up-left arrow, e6 black circle, g6 up-right arrow, d5 up-left arrow, f5 up-right arrow, c4 black circle, e4 white rook, g4 black circle, d3 down-left arrow, f3 down-right arrow, c2 down-left arrow, e2 black circle, g2 down-right arrow, b1 down-left arrow, h1 down-right arrow

Bede (notation BD). Moves as bishop or dabbaba, hence the name. Can jump for dabbaba moves.

Position: c6 black circle, g6 black circle, e5 black circle, d4 black circle, e4 white knight, f4 black circle, e3 black circle, c2 black circle, g2 black circle

Waffle (notation WA). Moves as wazir or alfil, hence the name. Can jump for all moves.

Position: c6 black circle, e6 black circle, g6 black circle, d5 black circle, f5 black circle, c4 black circle, e4 white bishop, g4 black circle, d3 black circle, f3 black circle, c2 black circle, e2 black circle, g2 black circle

FAD (notation FAD). Moves as ferz, alfil or dabbaba, hence the name. Can jump for all moves.

Position: a8 up-left arrow, b7 up-left arrow, h7 up-right arrow, c6 up-left arrow, d6 black circle, f6 black circle, g6 up-right arrow, c5 black circle, d5 up-left arrow, f5 up-right arrow, g5 black circle, e4 white archbishop, c3 black circle, d3 down-left arrow, f3 down-right arrow, g3 black circle, c2 down-left arrow, d2 black circle, f2 black circle, g2 down-right arrow, b1 down-left arrow, h1 down-right arrow

Cardinal (notation NB). Moves as bishop or knight. Can jump for knight moves.

As mentioned, when using this army and castling queenside, the king moves three squares (from e1 to b1) and the bede moves from a1 to c1.

A weakness of the Colorbound Clobberers are the unprotected pawns at a2 and h2. To cure this weakness, the positions of the waffle and the FAD can be switched. This alternate setup was already proposed by Ralph Betza and is named Colorbound Clobberers II.

=== Nutty Knights ===
This army includes a lot of leapers, but most of them have asymmetrical move patterns, with backward moves being restricted.

Position: e8 up arrow, e7 up arrow, e6 up arrow, e5 up arrow, a4 left arrow, b4 left arrow, c4 left arrow, d4 left arrow, e4 white rook, f4 right arrow, g4 right arrow, h4 right arrow, d3 black circle, e3 black circle, f3 black circle

Charging rook, originally furlrurlbakking (notation frlRrlbK), moves forward and sideways as a rook, or backward as a king.

Position: d6 black circle, f6 black circle, d5 black circle, f5 black circle, e4 white knight, d3 black circle, f3 black circle, d2 black circle, f2 black circle

Fibnif (notation fbNF). Moves as ferz, or as a knight for its two vertically longest forward and backward moves. Can jump for knight moves.

Position: d6 black circle, f6 black circle, c5 black circle, g5 black circle, d4 black circle, e4 white bishop, f4 black circle, d3 black circle, e3 black circle, f3 black circle

Charging knight, originally forfnibakking (notation fhNrlbK). Moves as king backward and sideways or as a knight forward. Can jump for all moves.

Position: e8 up arrow, e7 up arrow, d6 black circle, e6 up arrow, f6 black circle, c5 black circle, d5 black circle, e5 up arrow, f5 black circle, g5 black circle, a4 left arrow, b4 left arrow, c4 left arrow, d4 left arrow, e4 white queen, f4 right arrow, g4 right arrow, h4 right arrow, d3 black circle, e3 black circle, f3 black circle

Colonel, originally forfnifurlrurking (notation fhNfrlRK). Moves as king, or as rook forward and sideways, or as knight forward. Can jump for knight moves.

=== Remarkable Rookies ===
The rooks, knights, bishops, and queen are replaced by the following pieces:

Position: d8 left arrow, e8 left arrow, f8 left arrow, g8 left arrow, h8 white rook, h7 down arrow, b6 up arrow, h6 down arrow, b5 up arrow, h5 down arrow, b4 up arrow, h4 down arrow, b3 up arrow, a2 left arrow, b2 white rook, c2 right arrow, d2 right arrow, e2 right arrow, f2 right arrow, b1 down arrow

Short rook (notation W4). Moves as rook, but not more than 4 spaces.

Position: e6 black circle, e5 black circle, c4 black circle, d4 black circle, e4 white knight, f4 black circle, g4 black circle, e3 black circle, e2 black circle

Woody rook (notation WD). Moves as dabbaba or as wazir. Can jump for all moves.

Position: e7 black circle, e6 black circle, d5 black circle, f5 black circle, b4 black circle, c4 black circle, e4 white bishop, g4 black circle, h4 black circle, d3 black circle, f3 black circle, e2 black circle, e1 black circle

Half duck (notation HFD). Moves as threeleaper, dabbaba or ferz. Can jump for all moves.

Position: e8 up arrow, e7 up arrow, d6 black circle, e6 up arrow, f6 black circle, c5 black circle, e5 up arrow, g5 black circle, a4 left arrow, b4 left arrow, c4 left arrow, d4 left arrow, e4 white chancellor, f4 right arrow, g4 right arrow, h4 right arrow, c3 black circle, e3 down arrow, g3 black circle, d2 black circle, e2 down arrow, f2 black circle, e1 down arrow

Chancellor (notation RN). Moves as rook or knight. Can jump for knight moves.

== Strength of the armies ==
The armies were playtested in human play among chess masters and considered balanced at the time of their release. They were not playtested in computer games because at the time no engines playing chess variants were available. The release of Zillions of Games did not change the original assessment.

In 2010, H.G. Muller tested the Colourbound Clobberers and the Nutty Knights in the stronger engine Fairy-Max and found that both armies were significantly stronger than the FIDE pieces. He found that the Nutty Knights had an advantage of slightly more than a pawn above the FIDEs, and the Clobberers slightly less than a pawn. He also notes that the advantage of the Clobberers as an army is smaller than expected from the piece values alone.

In 2015 Fairy-Max was extended to handle limited sliders such as the Short Rook from the Remarkable Rookies. H.G. Muller ran a test of all four official armies against each other with the following result:

Relative strength of armies (based on 400 games)
Black White	R	N	C	F	Total
Rookies	—N/a	+3%	+13%	+15%	+62%
Nutters	-3%	—N/a	+3%	+12%	+19%
Clobberers	-13%	+0%	—N/a	+8%	-11%
FIDE	-16%	-10%	-10%	—N/a	-71%

In agreement with previous tests, it seems that the Rookies are the strongest, being only marginally stronger than the Nutters, while the Clobberers seem to be about half-way in strength between the Nutters and FIDE. The statistical error in 400 games is 2%, so from the 3% of the Rookies-Nutters result, it can be decided with >90% confidence that the Rookies indeed have the better chances here.

=== Proposed adjustments to the official armies ===
In light of the newer strength evaluations, several weakenings of the official armies were proposed. In 2012 J. Knappen proposed an adjustment to the Nutty Knights named Drunken Nights. Here the Charging Knight is weakened by removing the step directly backwards, decreasing its endgame value. The resulting piece is called Drunken Night.

In 2015 J. Knappen discussed some weakenings of the Remarkable Rookies and the Colorbound Clobberers, including the weakening of the Bede to a piece named Busy Beaver, where the Dabbaba jump is replaced by a zigzag sliding move to the same square. In 2016, Double sharp and H.G. Muller came up with playtested proposals for the Clobberers and the Rookies. In the Clobberers, the FAD is replaced by the Prime Minister. In the Rookies, the Short Rook is even shorter and has now only two steps in each orthogonal direction.

Position: d6 black circle, f6 black circle, c5 black circle, g5 black circle, d4 black circle, e4 white bishop, f4 black circle, d3 black circle, f3 black circle

Drunken night (notation fhNrlWbF). Moves as ferz backwards, one step orthogonally sideways, or as a knight forward. Can jump for all moves.

Position: a8 up-left arrow, b7 up-left arrow, h7 up-right arrow, c6 up-left arrow, e6 black cross, g6 up-right arrow, d5 up-left arrow, f5 up-right arrow, c4 black cross, e4 white rook, g4 black cross, d3 down-left arrow, f3 down-right arrow, c2 down-left arrow, e2 black cross, g2 down-right arrow, b1 down-left arrow, h1 down-right arrow

Busy Beaver (notation BzB2). Moves as bishop or two steps as a Boyscout. The squares marked with "x" can be reached via two different zigzag paths.

Position: c6 black circle, e6 black circle, g6 black circle, d5 black circle, f5 black circle, c4 black circle, e4 white bishop, g4 black circle, d3 black circle, f3 black circle, c2 black circle, e2 black circle, g2 black circle

Prime minister (notation FmaF). Moves as ferz and can continue moving as a ferz again. It need not take both steps. It must stop when it captures. It can return to its starting square, allowing the player to skip a turn.

Position: f8 left arrow, g8 left arrow, h8 white rook, h7 down arrow, h6 down arrow, b4 up arrow, b3 up arrow, a2 left arrow, b2 white rook, c2 right arrow, d2 right arrow, b1 down arrow

Short rook (notation W2). Moves as rook, but not more than two spaces.

== Unofficial armies ==
The four armies described above were playtested by Ralph Betza and selected as the most balanced ones. There are other armies, invented by Betza and other people, some of which are presented here.

In the initial version of the game, there were 8 armies and, in these armies, the king moved differently from the king in the standard chess. Instead of normal pawns, fairy pawns could be selected – for example, Berolina pawns. However, later Betza abandoned the idea of using fairy pieces for king and pawns and reduced the number of armies to four.

=== Forward FIDEs (Ralph Betza) ===
The rooks, knights, bishops, and queen are replaced by the following pieces:

Position: e8 up arrow, e7 up arrow, e6 up arrow, e5 up arrow, a4 left arrow, b4 left arrow, c4 left arrow, d4 left arrow, e4 white rook, f4 right arrow, g4 right arrow, h4 right arrow, d3 black circle, e3 black circle, f3 black circle

Charging rook (notation fsWWbFW). Moves forward and sideways as a rook, or backward as a king. This piece is also in the Nutty Knights army.

Position: d6 black circle, f6 black circle, c5 black circle, g5 black circle, e4 white knight, d3 down-left arrow, f3 down-right arrow, c2 down-left arrow, g2 down-right arrow, b1 down-left arrow, h1 down-right arrow

Knishop (notation fhNbFF). Moves forwards as knight or backwards as bishop. Can jump for knight moves.

Position: a8 up-left arrow, b7 up-left arrow, h7 up-right arrow, c6 up-left arrow, g6 up-right arrow, d5 up-left arrow, f5 up-right arrow, e4 white bishop, c3 black circle, g3 black circle, d2 black circle, f2 black circle

Bishight (notation fFFbhN). Moves forwards as bishop or backwards as knight. Can jump for knight moves.

Position: a8 up-left arrow, e8 up arrow, b7 up-left arrow, e7 up arrow, h7 up-right arrow, c6 up-left arrow, e6 up arrow, g6 up-right arrow, d5 up-left arrow, e5 up arrow, f5 up-right arrow, a4 left arrow, b4 left arrow, c4 left arrow, d4 left arrow, e4 white queen, f4 right arrow, g4 right arrow, h4 right arrow, c3 black circle, d3 black circle, e3 black circle, f3 black circle, g3 black circle, d2 black circle, f2 black circle

Forequeen (notation fsWWfFFbhNWF). Moves forwards or sideways as queen, or backwards as a king or knight. Can jump for knight moves.

=== Meticulous Mashers (Ralph Betza) ===
The rooks, knights, bishops, and queen are replaced by the following pieces:

Position: d8 left arrow, e8 left arrow, f8 left arrow, g8 left arrow, h8 white rook, g7 black circle, h7 down arrow, b6 up arrow, h6 down arrow, b5 up arrow, h5 down arrow, b4 up arrow, h4 down arrow, a3 black circle, b3 up arrow, c3 black circle, a2 left arrow, b2 white rook, c2 right arrow, d2 right arrow, e2 right arrow, f2 right arrow, a1 black circle, b1 down arrow, c1 black circle

Forfer (notation FR4). Moves as ferz, or up to 4 spaces as rook.

Position: d6 black circle, f6 black circle, d5 black circle, f5 black circle, e4 white knight, d3 black circle, f3 black circle, d2 black circle, f2 black circle

Fibnif (notation fbNF). Moves as ferz, or as a knight for its two longest forward and backward moves. This piece is also in the Nutty Knights army.

Position: b7 up-left arrow, c6 up-left arrow, d5 up-left arrow, f5 up arrow, h5 up-right arrow, e4 up-left arrow, g4 up-right arrow, d3 left arrow, f3 white bishop, h3 right arrow, e2 down-left arrow, g2 down-right arrow, d1 down-left arrow, f1 down arrow, h1 down-right arrow

B4nD (notation B4nD). Moves up to 4 spaces as bishop, or exactly 2 spaces as rook. It cannot jump over other pieces.

Position: d7 black circle, f7 up arrow, h7 black circle, f6 up arrow, b5 black circle, e5 black circle, f5 up arrow, g5 black circle, d4 black circle, f4 up arrow, h4 black circle, b3 left arrow, c3 left arrow, d3 left arrow, e3 left arrow, f3 white queen, g3 right arrow, h3 right arrow, d2 black circle, f2 down arrow, h2 black circle, b1 black circle, e1 black circle, f1 down arrow, g1 black circle

N2R4 (notation N2R4). Moves up to 4 spaces as rook, or makes up to 2 consecutive knight moves in the same direction. Can jump for knight moves, but the first must end on an empty space to be able to make a second one.

=== All-Around Allstars (Ralph Betza) ===
This army is made of one piece from each of the main armies. Out of the 12 eligible combinations, as the FAD from the Colorbound Clobberers is considered too strong for a Bishop equivalent and the Cardinal from the same army too weak for a Queen equivalent, Ralph Betza considers the following to be the "official" all-star team. The rooks, knights, and queen are replaced by the following pieces:

Position: e8 up arrow, e7 up arrow, e6 up arrow, e5 up arrow, a4 left arrow, b4 left arrow, c4 left arrow, d4 left arrow, e4 white rook, f4 right arrow, g4 right arrow, h4 right arrow, d3 black circle, e3 black circle, f3 black circle

Charging rook (notation frlRrlbK), from the Nutty Knights army.

Position: c6 black circle, g6 black circle, e5 black circle, d4 black circle, e4 white knight, f4 black circle, e3 black circle, c2 black circle, g2 black circle

Waffle (notation WA), from the Colorbound Clobberers army.

Position: e8 up arrow, e7 up arrow, d6 black circle, e6 up arrow, f6 black circle, c5 black circle, e5 up arrow, g5 black circle, a4 left arrow, b4 left arrow, c4 left arrow, d4 left arrow, e4 white chancellor, f4 right arrow, g4 right arrow, h4 right arrow, c3 black circle, e3 down arrow, g3 black circle, d2 black circle, e2 down arrow, f2 black circle, e1 down arrow

Chancellor (notation RN), from the Remarkable Rookies army.

There is another All-Around Allstars army by Ralph Betza. In this setup the restriction that an eligible piece must play in one of the four official armies is lifted and the Forward FIDEs and the Meticulous Mashers are also included. It has the following setup:

Position: e8 up arrow, e7 up arrow, e6 up arrow, e5 up arrow, a4 left arrow, b4 left arrow, c4 left arrow, d4 left arrow, e4 white rook, f4 right arrow, g4 right arrow, h4 right arrow, d3 black circle, e3 black circle, f3 black circle

Charging rook (notation frlRrlbK), from the Forward FIDEs and the Nutty Knights army.

Position: d6 black circle, f6 black circle, d5 black circle, f5 black circle, e4 white knight, d3 black circle, f3 black circle, d2 black circle, f2 black circle

Fibnif (notation fbNF), from the Meticulous Mashers and the Nutty Knights army.

Position: a8 up-left arrow, b7 up-left arrow, h7 up-right arrow, c6 up-left arrow, g6 up-right arrow, d5 up-left arrow, f5 up-right arrow, e4 white bishop, c3 black circle, g3 black circle, d2 black circle, f2 black circle

Bishight (notation fBbN), from the Forward FIDEs army.

Position: e8 up arrow, e7 up arrow, d6 black circle, e6 up arrow, f6 black circle, c5 black circle, e5 up arrow, g5 black circle, a4 left arrow, b4 left arrow, c4 left arrow, d4 left arrow, e4 white chancellor, f4 right arrow, g4 right arrow, h4 right arrow, c3 black circle, e3 down arrow, g3 black circle, d2 black circle, e2 down arrow, f2 black circle, e1 down arrow

Chancellor (notation RN), from the Remarkable Rookies army.

=== Amazon Army (Ralph Betza) ===
In this army, the rooks and queen are replaced by the following pieces:

Position: d8 left arrow, e8 left arrow, f8 left arrow, g8 left arrow, h8 white rook, h7 down arrow, b6 up arrow, h6 down arrow, b5 up arrow, h5 down arrow, b4 up arrow, h4 down arrow, b3 up arrow, a2 left arrow, b2 white rook, c2 right arrow, d2 right arrow, e2 right arrow, f2 right arrow, b1 down arrow

Short rook (notation W4). Moves as rook, but not more than 4 spaces. This piece is also in the Remarkable Rookies army.

Position: a8 up-left arrow, e8 up arrow, b7 up-left arrow, e7 up arrow, h7 up-right arrow, c6 up-left arrow, d6 black circle, e6 up arrow, f6 black circle, g6 up-right arrow, c5 black circle, d5 up-left arrow, e5 up arrow, f5 up-right arrow, g5 black circle, a4 left arrow, b4 left arrow, c4 left arrow, d4 left arrow, e4 A l, f4 right arrow, g4 right arrow, h4 right arrow, c3 black circle, d3 down-left arrow, e3 down arrow, f3 down-right arrow, g3 black circle, c2 down-left arrow, d2 black circle, e2 down arrow, f2 black circle, g2 down-right arrow, b1 down-left arrow, e1 down arrow, h1 down-right arrow

Amazon (notation WWFFN). Moves as queen or knight.

=== Cylindrical Cinders (Ralph Betza) ===
The rooks, knights, bishops, and queen are replaced by the following pieces:

Position: b6 black circle, f6 black circle, h5 black circle, a4 black circle, g4 black circle, h4 white rook, h3 black circle, b2 black circle, f2 black circle

Cylindrical Waffle (notation oWoA). Moves as wazir or alfil on a cylinder. Can jump for all moves.

Position: a6 black circle, g6 black circle, b5 black circle, f5 black circle, h4 white knight, b3 black circle, f3 black circle, a2 black circle, g2 black circle

Cylindrical Knight (notation oN). Moves as knight on a cylinder.

Position: c8 black cross, b7 up-right arrow, d7 up-left arrow, a6 up-right arrow, e6 up-left arrow, f5 up-left arrow, h5 up-right arrow, g4 white bishop, f3 down-left arrow, h3 down-right arrow, a2 down-right arrow, e2 down-left arrow, b1 down-right arrow, d1 down-left arrow

Cylindrical Bishop (notation oFF). Moves as bishop on a cylinder. The position with an x can be reached in 2 different ways.

Position: h8 up arrow, h7 up arrow, a6 black circle, g6 black circle, h6 up arrow, b5 black circle, f5 black circle, h5 up arrow, a4 left-right arrow, b4 left-right arrow, c4 left-right arrow, d4 left-right arrow, e4 left-right arrow, f4 left-right arrow, g4 left-right arrow, h4 white chancellor, b3 black circle, f3 black circle, h3 down arrow, a2 black circle, g2 black circle, h2 down arrow, h1 down arrow

Cylindrical Chancellor (notation oWWoN). Moves as rook or knight on a cylinder. Can jump for knight moves. The horizontal line can be reached from both directions.

=== Fighting Fizzies (Peter Aronson) ===
In this army, the left rook, the right rook, knights, bishops, and queen are replaced by the following pieces:

Position: d6 up-left arrow, f6 up arrow, c5 left arrow, d5 black circle, e5 black circle, f5 black circle, g5 up-right arrow, d4 black circle, e4 white rook, f4 black circle, c3 down-left arrow, d3 black circle, e3 black circle, f3 black circle, g3 right arrow, d2 down arrow, f2 down-right arrow

Left Single-Step Rhino (notation WF(mW-flF)(mF-flW)), on the left. Steps one square in any direction, then, if the first square is empty, may turn 45 degrees to the left, and move one more square.

Position: d6 up arrow, f6 up-right arrow, c5 up-left arrow, d5 black circle, e5 black circle, f5 black circle, g5 right arrow, d4 black circle, e4 white rook, f4 black circle, c3 left arrow, d3 black circle, e3 black circle, f3 black circle, g3 down-right arrow, d2 down-left arrow, f2 down arrow

Right Single-Step Rhino (notation WF(mW-frF)(mF-frW)), on the right. Turns 45 degrees to the right instead.

Position: e7 up arrow, d6 black circle, f6 black circle, e5 black circle, b4 left arrow, e4 white knight, h4 right arrow, e3 black circle, d2 black circle, f2 black circle, e1 down arrow

Gnohmon (notation vNvWnH). Moves as knight for its longest moves, as wazir vertically or slides 3 squares in orthogonal directions. Can jump for knight moves. The name Gnohmon is in reference to Ralph Betza who used gnohmon as a pseudonym on chessvariants.com.

Position: c6 up-left arrow, d5 up-left arrow, e5 black circle, g5 black circle, e4 up-left arrow, g4 up-right arrow, f3 white bishop, d2 black circle, e2 down-left arrow, g2 down-right arrow, h2 black circle

Crabinal (notation fNbsNhhB). Moves as knight for the longest forward and shortest backward moves, or as bishop for half the distance to the edge of the board. Can jump for knight moves.

Position: e8 black cross, d7 up-left arrow, f7 up-right arrow, e6 black cross, b5 up-left arrow, d5 up-left arrow, e5 black circle, f5 up-right arrow, h5 up-right arrow, a4 black cross, c4 black cross, d4 black circle, e4 white queen, f4 black circle, g4 black cross, b3 down-left arrow, d3 down-left arrow, e3 black circle, f3 down-right arrow, h3 down-right arrow, e2 black cross, d1 down-left arrow, f1 down-right arrow

Eagle-Scout (notation WzFF). Moves as wazir or as crooked bishop. Positions with an x can each be reached in 2 different ways.

=== Avian Airforce (Ralph Betza) ===
In this army, the rooks, knights, bishops, and queen are replaced by the following pieces:

Position: e8 up arrow, e6 up arrow, e5 black circle, a4 left arrow, c4 left arrow, d4 black circle, e4 white rook, f4 black circle, g4 right arrow, e3 black circle, e2 down arrow

Wader (notation WDD). Moves as wazir, or makes consecutive dabbaba moves (Dabbaba rider moves). Can jump between dabbaba moves.

Position: d7 black circle, f7 black circle, e6 black circle, d5 black circle, e5 white knight, f5 black circle, e4 black circle, c3 down-left arrow, g3 down-right arrow, a1 down-left arrow

Darter (notation fNWbAA). Moves as wazir, as knight for its 2 most forward moves and can make consecutive alfil moves backwards. Can jump between alfil moves.

Position: a8 up-left arrow, c6 up-left arrow, g6 up-right arrow, d5 black circle, f5 black circle, e4 white bishop, d3 black circle, f3 black circle, c2 down-left arrow, g2 down-right arrow

Faalcon (notation FAA). Moves as ferz, or makes consecutive alfil moves. Can jump between alfil moves.

Position: a8 up-left arrow, e8 up arrow, c6 up-left arrow, e6 up arrow, g6 up-right arrow, d5 black circle, e5 black circle, f5 black circle, a4 left arrow, c4 left arrow, d4 black circle, e4 white queen, f4 black circle, g4 right arrow, d3 black circle, e3 black circle, f3 black circle, c2 down-left arrow, e2 down arrow, g2 down-right arrow

Flying Kingfisher (notation WFAADD). Combines the moves of the Wader and the Faalcon.

=== Spacious Cannoneers (Ralph Betza) ===
In this army, the rooks, knights, bishops, and queen are replaced by the following pieces:

Position: e7 black rook, e6 black pawn, e4 black circle, a3 left arrow, b3 left arrow, c3 left arrow, d3 black circle, e3 white rook, f3 black circle, g3 right arrow, h3 right arrow, e2 black circle, e1 down arrow

Mortar, on the left. Moves and captures as wazir or a rook that must stop one space before any piece. Can leap over the first piece in an orthogonal line and capture the next piece on that line (here the black rook can be captured).

Position: e8 up arrow, e7 up arrow, e6 black pawn, e4 black circle, a3 left arrow, b3 left arrow, c3 left arrow, d3 black circle, e3 white rook, f3 black circle, g3 right arrow, h3 right arrow, e2 black circle, e1 down arrow

Howitzer, on the right. Moves and captures as wazir or a rook that must stop one space before any piece. Can leap over the first piece in an orthogonal line and land on any free space after it but before a second piece.

Position: d6 black circle, f6 black circle, e5 black circle, d4 black circle, e4 white knight, f4 black circle, e3 black circle, d2 black circle, f2 black circle

Napoleon (notation vNW). Moves as wazir or as knight for its longest moves. Can jump for all moves.

Position: a8 up-left arrow, b7 up-left arrow, h7 up-right arrow, c6 black pawn, g6 up-right arrow, f5 up-right arrow, e4 white bishop, d3 down-left arrow, f3 down-right arrow, c2 down-left arrow, g2 down-right arrow, b1 down-left arrow, h1 down-right arrow

Carronade. Moves as bishop but must stop one space before any piece. Can leap over the first piece in a diagonal line and then continue as a normal bishop.

Position: a8 up-left arrow, e8 up arrow, b7 up-left arrow, e7 black pawn, h7 up-right arrow, c6 black pawn, g6 up-right arrow, e5 black circle, f5 up-right arrow, a4 left arrow, b4 left arrow, c4 left arrow, d4 black circle, e4 white queen, f4 black circle, g4 right arrow, h4 right arrow, d3 down-left arrow, e3 black circle, f3 down-right arrow, c2 down-left arrow, e2 down arrow, g2 down-right arrow, b1 down-left arrow, e1 down arrow, h1 down-right arrow

Big Bertha. Combines the moves of the Howitzer and the Carronade.

Spacious pieces must stop one square before any piece on the board. They can advance to the edge of the board when the wraparound square is empty, a spacious rook can move from e1 to e8 because at the end of the move the square e1 is empty. Spacious pieces can capture another piece when the square behind that piece is empty, or, when the piece to capture is placed on the edge of the board, the wraparound square is empty. Spacious pieces cannot wraparound the edges of the board, the wraparound squares are only examined in the case of a move towards the border. In the Spacious Cannoneers army, several pieces combine a spacious piece with some kind of cannon piece.

=== Pizza Kings (John Lawson) ===
The rooks, knights, bishops, and queen are replaced by the following pieces:

Position: c6 black circle, g6 black circle, d5 black circle, e5 black circle, f5 black circle, c4 black circle, e4 white rook, g4 black circle, d3 black circle, e3 black circle, f3 black circle

Pepperoni (notation sDfAvWF). Moves as ferz, horizontally as dabbaba, vertically as wazir or forward as alfil. Can jump for all moves.

Position: d6 black circle, f6 black circle, b5 black circle, h5 black circle, e4 white knight, d3 black circle, f3 black circle, d2 black circle, f2 black circle

Mushroom (notation vNfsCbF). Moves forwards as knight for its longest moves, backwards as ferz or as camel for its shortest forward moves. Can jump for all moves.

Position: e7 black circle, d6 black circle, f6 black circle, d5 black circle, f5 black circle, d4 black circle, e4 white bishop, f4 black circle, d3 black circle, f3 black circle, d2 black circle, f2 black circle, e1 black circle

Sausage (notation sWFvNvH). Moves as ferz, horizontally as wazir, as knight for its longest moves or jumps 3 squares vertically. Can jump for all moves.

Position: c6 black circle, d6 black circle, e6 black circle, f6 black circle, g6 black circle, d5 black circle, e5 black circle, f5 black circle, c4 black circle, d4 black circle, e4 white queen, f4 black circle, g4 black circle, d3 black circle, e3 black circle, f3 black circle, c2 black circle, e2 black circle, g2 black circle

Meatball (notation FWADfN.). Moves as king, alfil, dabbaba or as knight for its 2 longest forward moves. Can jump for all moves.

=== Seeping Switchers (Jörg Knappen) ===
The rooks, knights, bishops, and queen are replaced by the following pieces:

Position: e7 up arrow, e5 up arrow, b4 left arrow, d4 left arrow, e4 white rook, f4 right arrow, h4 right arrow, e3 down arrow, e1 down arrow

Panda or Slip Rook (notation (W-DD)). Moves as rook, but only to squares of color opposite to that on which it stands. Can jump over squares it cannot move to.

Position: d6 black circle, f6 black circle, c5 black circle, e5 black circle, g5 black circle, d4 black circle, e4 white knight, f4 black circle, c3 black circle, e3 black circle, g3 black circle, d2 black circle, f2 black circle

Marquis (notation NW). Moves as knight or wazir. Can jump for knight moves.

Position: b8 up-left arrow, h8 up-right arrow, a7 up-left arrow, c7 up-left arrow, g7 up-right arrow, b6 up-left arrow, d6 black circle, f6 black circle, c5 black circle, g5 black circle, e4 white bishop, f4 black pawn, c3 black circle, g3 black circle, b2 down-left arrow, d2 black circle, f2 black circle, a1 down-left arrow, c1 down-left arrow, g1 down-right arrow

Unicorn (notation N(mW-FF)). Moves as knight, then may continue as bishop. Can jump for the knight moves, but longer moves require the corresponding wazir square to be empty. In this case, the unicorn may jump to g3 and g5, but is blocked from moving to h2 or h6 by the black pawn, which it cannot capture.

Position: b7 up-left arrow, e7 up arrow, h7 up-right arrow, d5 up-left arrow, e5 up arrow, f5 up-right arrow, b4 left arrow, d4 left arrow, e4 white queen, f4 right arrow, h4 right arrow, d3 down-left arrow, e3 down arrow, f3 down-right arrow, b1 down-left arrow, e1 down arrow, h1 down-right arrow

Erl Queen or Erlkönigin or Slip Queen (notation (W-DD)(F-AA)). Moves as queen, but jumps over every other space along its way.

=== Daring Dragons (H. G. Muller) ===
The rooks, knights, bishops, and queen are replaced by the following pieces:

Position: a8 up-left arrow, b7 up-left arrow, h7 up-right arrow, c6 up-left arrow, g6 up-right arrow, d5 up-left arrow, e5 black circle, f5 up-right arrow, d4 black circle, e4 white rook, f4 black circle, d3 down-left arrow, e3 black circle, f3 down-right arrow, c2 down-left arrow, g2 down-right arrow, b1 down-left arrow, h1 down-right arrow

Dragon Horse (notation WB). Moves as bishop or wazir.

Position: e8 up arrow, e7 up arrow, e6 up arrow, c5 black circle, e5 up arrow, g5 black circle, e4 white knight, c3 black circle, e3 down arrow, g3 black circle, e2 down arrow, e1 down arrow

Dragonfly (notation sNvR). Moves vertically as rook or sideways as knight. Can jump for knight moves.

Position: d6 white cross, f6 white cross, d5 black circle, e5 black circle, f5 black circle, d4 black circle, e4 white bishop, f4 black circle, d3 black circle, e3 black circle, f3 black circle, d2 white cross, f2 white cross

Dragoon (notation KivmN). Moves as king or, on its initial move, vertically and without capturing as a knight. Can jump for knight moves.

Position: a8 up-left arrow, b7 up-left arrow, h7 up-right arrow, c6 up-left arrow, d6 black circle, f6 black circle, g6 up-right arrow, d5 up-left arrow, f5 up-right arrow, a4 left arrow, b4 left arrow, c4 black circle, e4 white queen, g4 black circle, h4 right arrow, d3 down-left arrow, f3 down-right arrow, c2 down-left arrow, d2 black circle, f2 black circle, g2 down-right arrow, b1 down-left arrow, h1 down-right arrow

Wyvern (notation vNsjRB). Moves as bishop, vertically as knight, or at least 2 steps horizontally as a rook. Can jump for knight moves and jumps over the first square for rook moves.

=== Bent Bozos (H. G. Muller) ===
The left and right rooks, left and right knights, left and right bishops, and queen are replaced by the following pieces:

Position: f8 up arrow, f7 up arrow, f6 up arrow, a5 left arrow, b5 left arrow, c5 left arrow, d5 black circle, f5 black circle, e4 white rook, d3 black circle, f3 black circle, g3 right arrow, h3 right arrow, d2 down arrow, d1 down arrow

Left Griffon (notation FaflR). Moves as ferz and then, optionally, rotates 45 degrees left and then moves as a rook.

Position: d8 up arrow, d7 up arrow, d6 up arrow, d5 black circle, f5 black circle, g5 right arrow, h5 right arrow, e4 white rook, a3 left arrow, b3 left arrow, c3 left arrow, d3 black circle, f3 black circle, f2 down arrow, f1 down arrow

Right Griffon (notation FafrR). Rotates 45 degrees right instead.

Position: b8 up-left arrow, c7 up-left arrow, d6 up-left arrow, h6 up-right arrow, e5 black circle, g5 up-right arrow, d4 black circle, e4 white knight, f4 black circle, c3 down-left arrow, e3 black circle, b2 down-left arrow, f2 down-right arrow, a1 down-left arrow, g1 down-right arrow

Left Aanca (notation WaflB). Moves as wazir and then, optionally, rotates 45 degrees left and moves as bishop.

Position: h8 up-right arrow, a7 up-left arrow, g7 up-right arrow, b6 up-left arrow, f6 up-right arrow, c5 up-left arrow, e5 black circle, d4 black circle, e4 white knight, f4 black circle, e3 black circle, g3 down-right arrow, d2 down-left arrow, h2 down-right arrow, c1 down-left arrow

Right Aanca (notation WafrB). Rotates 45 degrees right instead.

Position: d6 black circle, e6 black circle, g5 black circle, c4 black circle, e4 white bishop, g4 black circle, c3 black circle, e2 black circle, f2 black circle

Left Sastik (notation DfflNdllNddrNfrrN)). Moves as dabbaba or a knight one to the left of the dababba move

Position: e6 black circle, f6 black circle, c5 black circle, c4 black circle, e4 white bishop, g4 black circle, g3 black circle, d2 black circle, e2 black circle

Right Sastik (notation DffrNdrrNddlNfllN)). Moves as dabbaba or a knight one to the right of the dababba move

Position: d8 up arrow, f8 up arrow, d7 up arrow, f7 up arrow, d6 up arrow, f6 up arrow, a5 left arrow, b5 left arrow, c5 left arrow, d5 black circle, f5 black circle, g5 right arrow, h5 right arrow, e4 white queen, a3 left arrow, b3 left arrow, c3 left arrow, d3 black circle, f3 black circle, g3 right arrow, h3 right arrow, d2 down arrow, f2 down arrow, d1 down arrow, f1 down arrow

Griffon (notation FafR). Moves as ferz and then optionally continues outwards as a rook.

=== Fearful Fairies (Jörg Knappen) ===
The rooks, knights, bishops, and queen are replaced by the following pieces:

Position: c6 black circle, g6 black circle, e5 black circle, d4 black circle, e4 white rook, f4 black circle, e3 black circle, c2 black circle, g2 black circle

Phoenix (notation WA). Moves as wazir or alfil. Can jump for all moves. Named waffle in the Colorbound Clobberers.

Position: d6 black circle, f6 black circle, c5 black circle, d5 black circle, f5 black circle, g5 black circle, e4 white knight, c3 black circle, d3 black circle, f3 black circle, g3 black circle, d2 black circle, f2 black circle

Dullahan (notation FN). Moves as knight or ferz.

Position: c6 black circle, g6 black circle, d5 black circle, f5 black circle, e4 white bishop, d3 black circle, f3 black circle, c2 black circle, g2 black circle

Fearful (notation FA). Moves as one square diagonally or jump two squares diagonally. The name is a word play on Ferz-Alfil aka Ferfil.

Position: a8 up-left arrow, c8 black circle, g8 black circle, b7 up-left arrow, h7 up-right arrow, a6 black circle, c6 up-left arrow, d6 black circle, f6 black circle, g6 up-right arrow, c5 black circle, d5 up-left arrow, f5 up-right arrow, g5 black circle, e4 white archbishop, c3 black circle, d3 down-left arrow, f3 down-right arrow, g3 black circle, a2 black circle, c2 down-left arrow, d2 black circle, f2 black circle, g2 down-right arrow, b1 down-left arrow, h1 down-right arrow

Banshee (notation BNN). Moves as Bishop or Nightrider, making consecutive knight moves in the same direction. It may jump over pieces using the knight moves, but all intermediate knight squares must be free.

=== Silly Sliders (H. G. Muller) ===
The rooks, knights, bishops, and queen are replaced by the following pieces:

Position: e8 up arrow, e7 up arrow, e6 up arrow, d5 black circle, f5 black circle, a4 left arrow, b4 left arrow, c4 left arrow, e4 white rook, g4 right arrow, h4 right arrow, d3 black circle, f3 black circle, e2 down arrow, e1 down arrow

Lame Duck (notation FyafW). Moves as rook or ferz, but may not move like a wazir.

Position: e6 black circle, d5 black circle, f5 black circle, c4 black circle, e4 white knight, g4 black circle, d3 black circle, f3 black circle, e2 black circle

Diamond (notation FD). Moves as ferz or dabbaba. Can jump for dabbaba moves.

Position: a8 up-left arrow, b7 up-left arrow, h7 up-right arrow, c6 up-left arrow, g6 up-right arrow, e5 black circle, d4 black circle, e4 white bishop, f4 black circle, e3 black circle, c2 down-left arrow, g2 down-right arrow, b1 down-left arrow, h1 down-right arrow

Onyx (notation WyafF). Moves as bishop or wazir, but may not move like a ferz.

Position: a8 up-left arrow, e8 up arrow, b7 up-left arrow, e7 up arrow, h7 up-right arrow, c6 up-left arrow, d6 black circle, e6 up arrow, f6 black circle, g6 up-right arrow, c5 black circle, g5 black circle, a4 left arrow, b4 left arrow, c4 left arrow, e4 white queen, g4 right arrow, h4 right arrow, c3 black circle, g3 black circle, c2 down-left arrow, d2 black circle, e2 down arrow, f2 black circle, g2 down-right arrow, b1 down-left arrow, e1 down arrow, h1 down-right arrow

Squire (notation NyafK). Moves as amazon, but may not move like a king. Can jump for knight moves.

=== Hoppel-Poppel ===
Hoppel-Poppel is originally a popular chess variant from Germany played with equal armies. Its army fits perfectly into Chess with Different Armies and is therefore listed here. In this army the knights and bishops are replaced by the following pieces:

Position: a8 black circle, b7 black circle, h7 black circle, c6 black circle, d6 black cross, f6 black cross, g6 black circle, c5 black cross, d5 black circle, f5 black circle, g5 black cross, e4 white knight, c3 black cross, d3 black circle, f3 black circle, g3 black cross, c2 black circle, d2 black cross, f2 black cross, g2 black circle, b1 black circle, h1 black circle

Knibis (notation mNcB). Moves without capture as a knight, captures as a bishop.

Position: a8 black cross, b7 black cross, h7 black cross, c6 black cross, d6 black circle, f6 black circle, g6 black cross, c5 black circle, d5 black cross, f5 black cross, g5 black circle, e4 white bishop, c3 black circle, d3 black cross, f3 black cross, g3 black circle, c2 black cross, d2 black circle, f2 black circle, g2 black cross, b1 black cross, h1 black cross

Biskni (notation mBcN). Moves without capture as bishop, captures as a knight.
