= Grand Chess =

Chess variant

	a	b	c	d	e	f	g	h	i	j
10	a10 black rook	b10	c10	d10	e10	f10	g10	h10	i10	j10 black rook	10
9	a9	b9 black knight	c9 black bishop	d9 black queen	e9 black king	f9 black empress	g9 black princess	h9 black bishop	i9 black knight	j9	9
8	a8 black pawn	b8 black pawn	c8 black pawn	d8 black pawn	e8 black pawn	f8 black pawn	g8 black pawn	h8 black pawn	i8 black pawn	j8 black pawn	8
7	a7	b7	c7	d7	e7	f7	g7	h7	i7	j7	7
6	a6	b6	c6	d6	e6	f6	g6	h6	i6	j6	6
5	a5	b5	c5	d5	e5	f5	g5	h5	i5	j5	5
4	a4	b4	c4	d4	e4	f4	g4	h4	i4	j4	4
3	a3 white pawn	b3 white pawn	c3 white pawn	d3 white pawn	e3 white pawn	f3 white pawn	g3 white pawn	h3 white pawn	i3 white pawn	j3 white pawn	3
2	a2	b2 white knight	c2 white bishop	d2 white queen	e2 white king	f2 white empress	g2 white princess	h2 white bishop	i2 white knight	j2	2
1	a1 white rook	b1	c1	d1	e1	f1	g1	h1	i1	j1 white rook	1
	a	b	c	d	e	f	g	h	i	j

Grand Chess starting setup. Marshals are on f2/f9; cardinals are on g2/g9.

Grand Chess is a large-board chess variant invented by Dutch games designer Christian Freeling in 1984. It is played on a 10×10 board, with each side having two additional pawns and two new pieces: the marshal and the cardinal.

- The marshal (M) combines powers of a rook and a knight.
- The cardinal (C) combines powers of a bishop and a knight.

Grand Chess uses the same pieces as the earlier variant Capablanca chess, but differs in board size, start position, rules governing pawn moves and promotion, and castling.

A series of Grand Chess Cyber World Championship matches was sponsored by the Dutch game site MindSports. (Note: MindSports) Grand Chess tournaments were held annually beginning in 1998 by the (now defunct) correspondence game club NOST. (Note: NOST (kNights of the Square Table), formed in 1960 by Bob Lauzon and Jim France, held an annual convention and enjoyed several hundred active members (Pritchard 1994:210).) Larry Kaufman has written that Grand Chess "really is an excellent game and deserves a bigger following".

== Rules ==
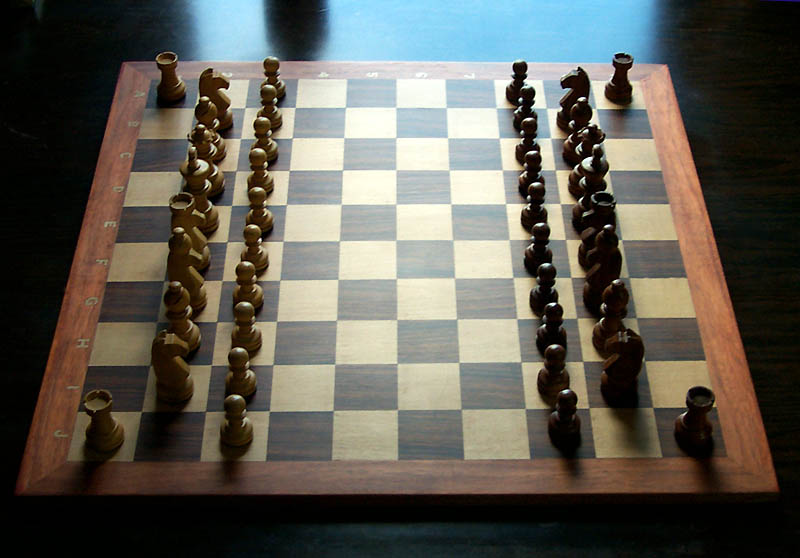
Grand Chess set

The pieces are placed on the players' first and second ranks, respectively, with the rooks alone on the players' first ranks. The pawns are placed on the players' third ranks. Since the rooks are not blocked as much by the other pieces as in standard chess, it is easier for them to activate earlier in the game.

A pawn that reaches a player's eighth or ninth ranks can elect to either promote or remain a pawn, but it must promote upon reaching the tenth rank. Unlike standard chess, a pawn may be promoted only to a captured piece of the same colour. (So, it is impossible for either side to own two queens, or two marshals, or three rooks, etc.) If, and for as long as, no captured piece is available to promote to, a pawn on a player's ninth rank must stay on the ninth rank, but it can still give check.

As in standard chess: pawns can move one or two squares on their first move; pawns can capture en passant; checkmate is a win; stalemate is a draw. There is no castling in Grand Chess. (Note: "We're so used to castling that we tend to forget that it is the weirdest move in Chess, implemented specifically to solve a problem. Chess turned out a great game despite its problem, but it needed an ad hoc fix to do so. In grand chess, pawns retain their usual distance and rooks are free from the onset, so the problem doesn't exist in the first place." — Freeling)

== Coverage ==
Grand Chess was described in the January 1987 issue of Games magazine.

== Examples ==
=== Vehre vs. Schmittberger, 2001 ===
	a	b	c	d	e	f	g	h	i	j
10	a10 black rook	b10	c10 black king	d10	e10	f10 black rook	g10	h10	i10 black princess	j10	10
9	a9	b9	c9	d9	e9 white rook	f9	g9	h9	i9	j9	9
8	a8 black pawn	b8	c8 black pawn	d8	e8 white empress	f8	g8	h8 black pawn	i8 black pawn	j8 black pawn	8
7	a7	b7	c7 black pawn	d7 black knight	e7	f7	g7	h7	i7	j7	7
6	a6	b6	c6	d6 black pawn	e6	f6	g6	h6	i6	j6	6
5	a5	b5	c5	d5 black bishop	e5	f5 white knight	g5	h5	i5	j5	5
4	a4	b4	c4	d4 white pawn	e4	f4	g4 white pawn	h4 white pawn	i4	j4	4
3	a3 white pawn	b3 white pawn	c3 white pawn	d3	e3	f3	g3	h3 white pawn	i3	j3 white pawn	3
2	a2	b2	c2	d2	e2	f2	g2	h2	i2	j2	2
1	a1	b1	c1	d1	e1 white rook	f1	g1 white king	h1	i1	j1	1
	a	b	c	d	e	f	g	h	i	j

Final position after 29.Mxe8

Played between John Vehre and R. Wayne Schmittberger at the 2001 Grand Chess Cyber Championship Final:

1.f5 f6 2.Nh4 Nh7 3.g4 g7 4.Nc4 Nc7 5.d4 d7 6.e5 Bd8! 7.Rje1 Kd10 8.Kf1 fxe5 9.Ncxe5?! Kc9 10.Re2? Kb9 11.Kg1 Rjf10 12.Bd3 e6 13.Rf1 Mh10?! 14.Nc4 Ci10 15.Nd6 exf5 16.Bxf5 Bd5 17.Ci1 Bxh4 18.ixh4 g6? 19.Rfe1 gxf5 20.Nxf5! Qd8 21.Bxc7 Qxc7 22.Re9+ Kc10 23.Cxc7 bxc7 24.Qf4 d6 25.Qe3 Mg8 26.Me2 Nf6 27.Qe7 Nd7 28.Qe8+ Mxe8 29.Mxe8 1–0 [Annotations by Vehre]

=== Fool's mate ===
	a	b	c	d	e	f	g	h	i	j
10	a10 black rook	b10	c10	d10	e10	f10 black queen	g10	h10	i10	j10 black rook	10
9	a9	b9 black knight	c9 black bishop	d9	e9 black king	f9 black empress	g9 black princess	h9 black bishop	i9 black knight	j9	9
8	a8 black pawn	b8 black pawn	c8 white princess	d8 black pawn	e8 black pawn	f8 black pawn	g8 black pawn	h8 black pawn	i8 black pawn	j8 black pawn	8
7	a7	b7	c7	d7	e7	f7	g7	h7	i7	j7	7
6	a6	b6	c6	d6	e6	f6	g6	h6	i6	j6	6
5	a5	b5	c5	d5	e5	f5	g5	h5	i5	j5	5
4	a4	b4	c4	d4	e4	f4	g4	h4	i4	j4	4
3	a3 white pawn	b3 white pawn	c3 white pawn	d3 white pawn	e3 white pawn	f3 white pawn	g3 white pawn	h3 white pawn	i3 white pawn	j3 white pawn	3
2	a2	b2 white knight	c2 white bishop	d2 white queen	e2 white king	f2 white empress	g2	h2 white bishop	i2 white knight	j2	2
1	a1 white rook	b1	c1	d1	e1	f1	g1	h1	i1	j1 white rook	1
	a	b	c	d	e	f	g	h	i	j

Position after 3.Cxc8#

1.Cf4 Qd10 2.Ce6 Qf10?? 3.Cxc8#

=== Composition ===
	a	b	c	d	e	f	g	h	i	j
10	a10	b10	c10	d10	e10	f10	g10	h10	i10	j10	10
9	a9	b9	c9	d9	e9	f9	g9	h9	i9	j9 black king	9
8	a8	b8	c8	d8	e8	f8	g8	h8	i8	j8	8
7	a7	b7	c7	d7	e7	f7	g7	h7 white pawn	i7	j7	7
6	a6	b6	c6	d6	e6	f6	g6	h6	i6 white king	j6	6
5	a5	b5	c5	d5	e5	f5	g5	h5	i5	j5	5
4	a4	b4	c4	d4	e4	f4	g4	h4	i4	j4	4
3	a3	b3	c3	d3	e3	f3	g3	h3	i3	j3	3
2	a2	b2	c2	d2	e2	f2	g2	h2	i2	j2	2
1	a1 white queen	b1	c1	d1	e1	f1	g1	h1	i1	j1	1
	a	b	c	d	e	f	g	h	i	j

Mate in 2
by Pal Benko
Solution: 1.Qj10+ Kxj10 2.h8=C#

== Embassy chess ==
	a	b	c	d	e	f	g	h	i	j
8	a8 black rook	b8 black knight	c8 black bishop	d8 black queen	e8 black king	f8 black empress	g8 black princess	h8 black bishop	i8 black knight	j8 black rook	8
7	a7 black pawn	b7 black pawn	c7 black pawn	d7 black pawn	e7 black pawn	f7 black pawn	g7 black pawn	h7 black pawn	i7 black pawn	j7 black pawn	7
6	a6	b6	c6	d6	e6	f6	g6	h6	i6	j6	6
5	a5	b5	c5	d5	e5	f5	g5	h5	i5	j5	5
4	a4	b4	c4	d4	e4	f4	g4	h4	i4	j4	4
3	a3	b3	c3	d3	e3	f3	g3	h3	i3	j3	3
2	a2 white pawn	b2 white pawn	c2 white pawn	d2 white pawn	e2 white pawn	f2 white pawn	g2 white pawn	h2 white pawn	i2 white pawn	j2 white pawn	2
1	a1 white rook	b1 white knight	c1 white bishop	d1 white queen	e1 white king	f1 white empress	g1 white princess	h1 white bishop	i1 white knight	j1 white rook	1
	a	b	c	d	e	f	g	h	i	j

Embassy chess starting position

Embassy chess is a variant of Grand Chess created in 2005 by Kevin Hill. It borrows the opening setup from Grand Chess and adapts it to the 10×8 board. Except for the setup, the rules are as per Capablanca chess.

There are multiple chess engines that can play Embassy chess, including ChessV, Zillions of Games, Sjaak 2, and Fairy-Stockfish.
