= Chancellor chess =

Chess variant

	a	b	c	d	e	f	g	h	i
9	a9 black rook	b9 black knight	c9 black bishop	d9 black queen	e9 black king	f9 black empress	g9 black knight	h9 black bishop	i9 black rook	9
8	a8 black pawn	b8 black pawn	c8 black pawn	d8 black pawn	e8 black pawn	f8 black pawn	g8 black pawn	h8 black pawn	i8 black pawn	8
7	a7	b7	c7	d7	e7	f7	g7	h7	i7	7
6	a6	b6	c6	d6	e6	f6	g6	h6	i6	6
5	a5	b5	c5	d5	e5	f5	g5	h5	i5	5
4	a4	b4	c4	d4	e4	f4	g4	h4	i4	4
3	a3	b3	c3	d3	e3	f3	g3	h3	i3	3
2	a2 white pawn	b2 white pawn	c2 white pawn	d2 white pawn	e2 white pawn	f2 white pawn	g2 white pawn	h2 white pawn	i2 white pawn	2
1	a1 white rook	b1 white knight	c1 white bishop	d1 white queen	e1 white king	f1 white empress	g1 white knight	h1 white bishop	i1 white rook	1
	a	b	c	d	e	f	g	h	i

Chancellor chess board and starting setup. Chancellors are on f1/f9. "Notice that the positions of B and N are reversed on the king's sides in order that bishop pairs are on opposite coloured squares."

Chancellor chess is a chess variant invented by Benjamin R. Foster in 1887. It features all the regular chess pieces plus one chancellor and extra pawn per side, on a 9×9 board.

John Gollon, in Chess Variations: Ancient, Regional, and Modern, expressed his belief that a variant like Foster's "will be the next step to the evolution of chess", because the addition of a single piece, the chancellor, a combination of rook and knight, "preserves a symmetry of power" on the chessboard with the queen, a combination of rook and bishop.

== Game rules ==
The starting setup is as shown. All the standard rules of chess apply, but when reaching the final rank, pawns can promote to one of the usual pieces or to chancellor.

== History ==
Chancellor chess was invented by Ben R. Foster in 1887 and was first published the same year in the St. Louis Globe-Democrat. Foster published a booklet titled Chancellor Chess in 1889, "dedicated to all liberal-minded chess players throughout the world". An advertisement for a book by Foster on the game appeared in American Chess magazine in October 1898. The ad informed that the game was named after the new piece, the chancellor, with the board "enlarged to nine squares".

== See also ==
- Modern chess – a 9×9 variant featuring one prime minister per side
