= Empress (chess) =

Fairy chess piece

White empress

Black empress

Common icons used in diagrams

The empress is a fairy chess piece that can move like a rook or a knight. It cannot jump over other pieces when moving as a rook but may do so when moving as a knight. The piece has acquired many alternative names, (Note: Less common names the piece has acquired include admiral, cannon, champion, chancellor, colonel, concubine, count, dabbabah, duke, elephant, guard, knook, lambeth, lord chancellor, marshal, samurai, superrook, tank, visier, and wolf.) with the most common being chancellor, marshal, and knook.

Chess moves in this article use E as notation for the empress.

== Movement ==
The empress can move as a rook or a knight.

Position: b8 black king, a7 black pawn, b7 black pawn, e7 black pawn, d6 black circle, e6 black cross, f6 black circle, c5 black circle, d5 white pawn, e5 black cross, g5 black circle, a4 black cross, b4 black cross, c4 black cross, d4 black cross, e4 white chancellor, f4 black cross, g4 white pawn, c3 black circle, e3 black cross, f3 white pawn, g3 black circle, d2 black circle, e2 black cross, f2 black circle, g2 white pawn, e1 black cross, g1 white king

The empress can move, but not jump, to squares with crosses; jump to squares with dots; or capture the black pawn on e7.

Position: e8 black cross, e7 black cross, d6 black circle, e6 black cross, f6 black circle, c5 black circle, e5 black cross, g5 black circle, a4 black cross, b4 black cross, c4 black cross, d4 black cross, e4 white chancellor, f4 black cross, g4 black cross, h4 black cross, c3 black circle, e3 black cross, g3 black circle, d2 black circle, e2 black cross, f2 black circle, e1 black cross

Maximum range of an empress on an empty board

== History and nomenclature ==
The empress is one of the most simply described fairy chess pieces and as such has a long history and has gone by many names. It was first used in Turkish Great Chess, a large medieval variant of chess, where it was called the war machine (dabbabah; not to be confused with the piece more commonly referred to as the dabbaba today, which is the (2,0) leaper). It was introduced in the West with Carrera's chess from 1617, where it was called a champion, (Note: The game seems to have been an afterthought to his chess treatise and it is mysterious to what extent, if any, he might have used it in practice while he lived, viz. Capablanca Chess.) and has been used in many chess variants since then.

The name chancellor was introduced by Ben Foster in his large variant Chancellor Chess (chess on a 9×9 board, with a chancellor on the opposite side of the king as the queen), and the name marshal was introduced by L. Tressan in his large variant The Sultan's Game. José Raúl Capablanca used both in his large variant Capablanca Chess: he originally called this piece the marshal, but later changed it to chancellor, which was his original name for the archbishop. Both chancellor and marshal are popular names for the rook+knight compound, although a case could be made for marshal, as the word is related to mare (female horse) and thus fits better for a piece that can move like a knight than chancellor, which has no connection to horses. Also, there are many commonly used chess pieces that, like chancellor, begin with C (e.g. the cannon in xiangqi, the camel in Tamerlane Chess, the champion in Omega Chess, and the cardinal or princess), and using the name marshal for the rook+knight compound would reduce this difficulty.

The name empress is the most widely used name among problemists. By analogy with the queen, which is a rook+bishop compound, it was suggested that the three basic combinations of the three simple chess pieces (rook, knight, and bishop) should all be named after female royalty. Since the rook+knight compound seemed to be obviously stronger than the bishop+knight compound (as the rook is stronger than the bishop), the name empress was used for the rook+knight compound, and the bishop+knight compound was called the princess. However, the word empress suggests a piece stronger than the queen, while this piece is at best equal to and perhaps weaker than the queen, especially in the endgame.

== Value ==
Position: f8 white king, h7 black king, f5 white chancellor

White to move can mate in one with 1.Eh4#.

Position: d8 white chancellor, f7 black pawn, g7 black pawn, h7 black king, h6 black pawn, d1 white king

Empress can mate by its own by move to 1. Ef8#.

Ralph Betza (inventor of chess with different armies, in which the empress was used in one of the armies) rated the empress as about nine points, equivalent to a queen, as the knight and bishop were about equal and the empress and queen were simply the knight and bishop with the power of a rook added to both. He noted that the queen may be slightly stronger than the empress in the endgame, but that the empress, on the other hand, has a greater ability to give perpetual checks and salvage a draw in an otherwise lost game. Unlike the queen, which can move in 8 different directions, the empress can move in 12.

In the endgame of king and amazon (queen+knight compound) versus king and empress, the amazon usually wins, but in a few positions, the weaker side may force a draw by setting up a fortress. These fortresses force the side with the amazon to give perpetual check, as otherwise the side with the empress can force a simplification or give its own perpetual check. King and empress versus king is a forced win for the side with the empress; checkmate can be forced within 11 moves. In comparison, the queen requires 10 moves, and the rook requires 16.

The drawing positions in the queen versus pawn endgame do not exist in the empress versus pawn endgame.

== Examples ==
	a	b	c	d	e	f	g	h	i	j
8	a8 black rook	b8 black knight	c8 black bishop	d8 black empress	e8 black queen	f8 black king	g8 black princess	h8 black bishop	i8 black knight	j8 black rook	8
7	a7 black pawn	b7 black pawn	c7 black pawn	d7 black pawn	e7 black pawn	f7 black pawn	g7 black pawn	h7 black pawn	i7 black pawn	j7 black pawn	7
6	a6	b6	c6	d6	e6	f6	g6	h6	i6	j6	6
5	a5	b5	c5	d5	e5	f5	g5	h5	i5	j5	5
4	a4	b4	c4	d4	e4	f4	g4	h4	i4	j4	4
3	a3	b3	c3	d3	e3	f3	g3	h3	i3	j3	3
2	a2 white pawn	b2 white pawn	c2 white pawn	d2 white pawn	e2 white pawn	f2 white pawn	g2 white pawn	h2 white pawn	i2 white pawn	j2 white pawn	2
1	a1 white rook	b1 white knight	c1 white bishop	d1 white empress	e1 white queen	f1 white king	g1 white princess	h1 white bishop	i1 white knight	j1 white rook	1
	a	b	c	d	e	f	g	h	i	j

Capablanca chess starting position. Empresses are on d1 and d8; princesses are on g1 and g8.

Position: a8 black rook, b8 black knight, c8 black bishop, d8 black chancellor, e8 black king, f8 black bishop, g8 black knight, h8 black rook, a7 black pawn, b7 black pawn, c7 black pawn, d7 black pawn, e7 black pawn, f7 black pawn, g7 black pawn, h7 black pawn, a2 white pawn, b2 white pawn, c2 white pawn, d2 white pawn, e2 white pawn, f2 white pawn, g2 white pawn, h2 white pawn, a1 white rook, b1 white knight, c1 white bishop, d1 white chancellor, e1 white king, f1 white bishop, g1 white knight, h1 white rook

Almost chess starting position. Empresses replace queens.

Many chess variants use a rook+knight compound, but due to its powerful ability, it is uncommon for variants to use more than one per colour on a normal 8×8 board. Seirawan chess uses one such piece (called an elephant) per colour. Capablanca chess uses one empress per colour on a 10×8 board.

Almost chess replaces queens with empresses; these pieces are approximately equal in value.

== Symbol ==
Both white and black symbols for the empress were added to version 12 of the Unicode standard in March 2019, in the Chess Symbols block:

🩏 U+1FA4F WHITE CHESS KNIGHT-ROOK
🩒 U+1FA52 BLACK CHESS KNIGHT-ROOK

== See also ==
- Amazon – the queen+knight compound
- Princess – the bishop+knight compound
- Queen – the rook+bishop compound
