= Modern chess =

Chess variant

	a	b	c	d	e	f	g	h	i
9	a9 black rook	b9 black knight	c9 black bishop	d9 black queen	e9 black king	f9 black princess	g9 black bishop	h9 black knight	i9 black rook	9
8	a8 black pawn	b8 black pawn	c8 black pawn	d8 black pawn	e8 black pawn	f8 black pawn	g8 black pawn	h8 black pawn	i8 black pawn	8
7	a7	b7	c7	d7	e7	f7	g7	h7	i7	7
6	a6	b6	c6	d6	e6	f6	g6	h6	i6	6
5	a5	b5	c5	d5	e5	f5	g5	h5	i5	5
4	a4	b4	c4	d4	e4	f4	g4	h4	i4	4
3	a3	b3	c3	d3	e3	f3	g3	h3	i3	3
2	a2 white pawn	b2 white pawn	c2 white pawn	d2 white pawn	e2 white pawn	f2 white pawn	g2 white pawn	h2 white pawn	i2 white pawn	2
1	a1 white rook	b1 white knight	c1 white bishop	d1 white princess	e1 white king	f1 white queen	g1 white bishop	h1 white knight	i1 white rook	1
	a	b	c	d	e	f	g	h	i

Modern chess starting setup. Each prime minister is to the left of its king.

Modern chess is a chess variant played on a 9×9 board. The game was invented by Gabriel Vicente Maura in 1968. Besides the usual set of chess pieces, each player has a prime minister, which can move both like a bishop and a knight, and an additional pawn.

The first match was played in Madrid at Escuela de Bellas Artes de San Fernando's cafe on March 18, 1968. The players were Gabriel Vicente Maura himself (White), and Bonifacio Pedraz Cabezas (Black).

== Game rules ==
The starting setup is as shown. All the standard rules of chess apply, along with the following special rules:

- A player can castle either ministerside (notated "0-M-0") or queenside (notated "0-Q-0"); in either case the king slides two squares toward the castling rook.
- When reaching the final rank, pawns can promote to one of the usual pieces or to prime minister.

=== Optional rule ===
In response to criticism that bishops are restricted to only one square color, the inventor proposed an optional new rule, if the players agree:

- One bishop may switch its position with a piece adjacent to it, provided that the bishop and the piece adjacent have not yet moved in the game. The switch is counted as a normal move. The notation for the move is B=[adjacent piece used]; for example B=Q for bishop and queen switch, or B=MN for a switch of the bishop and the minister's knight.

According to Ed Friedlander, in the countries where the game is played more commonly, another popular way to create a light square bishop is to require that one of the bishops must move one square orthogonally as its first move.

== See also ==
- Chancellor chess – a 9×9 variant featuring one chancellor per side
