= Janus Chess =

Chess variant played on a 10x8 board

	a	b	c	d	e	f	g	h	i	j
8	a8 black rook	b8 black princess	c8 black knight	d8 black bishop	e8 black king	f8 black queen	g8 black bishop	h8 black knight	i8 black princess	j8 black rook	8
7	a7 black pawn	b7 black pawn	c7 black pawn	d7 black pawn	e7 black pawn	f7 black pawn	g7 black pawn	h7 black pawn	i7 black pawn	j7 black pawn	7
6	a6	b6	c6	d6	e6	f6	g6	h6	i6	j6	6
5	a5	b5	c5	d5	e5	f5	g5	h5	i5	j5	5
4	a4	b4	c4	d4	e4	f4	g4	h4	i4	j4	4
3	a3	b3	c3	d3	e3	f3	g3	h3	i3	j3	3
2	a2 white pawn	b2 white pawn	c2 white pawn	d2 white pawn	e2 white pawn	f2 white pawn	g2 white pawn	h2 white pawn	i2 white pawn	j2 white pawn	2
1	a1 white rook	b1 white princess	c1 white knight	d1 white bishop	e1 white king	f1 white queen	g1 white bishop	h1 white knight	i1 white princess	j1 white rook	1
	a	b	c	d	e	f	g	h	i	j

Janus Chess initial position. The januses (knight+bishop compounds) start on the b- and i-files.

Janus Chess is a chess variant invented in 1978 by Werner Schöndorf from Bildstock, Germany. It is played on a 10×8 board and features a fairy chess piece, the janus, with the combined moves of a bishop and a knight. The janus piece is named after the Roman god Janus because this god was usually depicted with two faces looking in opposite directions.

== Description ==
The usual set of chess pieces is extended with two pawns and two januses per player. Each janus is placed between a rook and a knight. The relative position of the king and queen is reversed compared to chess. After castling, the king stands on either the b- or i-file and a rook stands on either the c- or h-file, depending on which side castling is done.

The janus is considered almost as powerful as a queen and is usually valued at about 8 points (based on chess piece values with pawns valued at 1). It is the only piece in the game that is able to checkmate the opponent's king without the assistance of any other piece, with the king in a corner and the janus two squares away on a diagonal, but this checkmate cannot be forced. Due to the extra pieces, each player starts the game with considerably more "material power" compared to standard chess; however, the game has only a slightly higher material "power density", since there is more room for players to maneuver pieces because of the larger board (10×8 = 80 squares). Due to the different board and pieces, players are unable to use normal chess opening theory, and chess tablebases have limited value in the endgame.

Janus Chess has been popular in Europe with regular tournaments drawing strong players. Several chess grandmasters have played this game including Viktor Korchnoi, Péter Lékó and Artur Yusupov. Korchnoi said: "I like playing Janus Chess because one can show more creativity than in normal chess."

== See also ==
Chess engines that play Janus Chess:

- ChessV
- Fairy-Max
