= Princess (chess) =

Fairy chess piece

White princess

Black princess

Common icons used in diagrams

The princess is a fairy chess piece that can move like a bishop or a knight. It cannot jump over other pieces when moving as a bishop, but may do so when moving as a knight. The piece has acquired many other names, the most common alternatives being archbishop and cardinal; (Note: Less common names the piece has acquired include adjutant, aircraft, centaur, chancellor, davidson, deacon, equerry, fox, hawk, horseman, janus, monk, pilot, police chief, prime minister, rhino, squire, superbishop, templar, wazir, and zek.) it may also simply be called a bishop+knight compound.

Chess moves in this article use letter H as notation for the princess.

== Movement ==
The princess can move as a bishop or a knight.

Position: a8 black cross, b7 black cross, c6 black cross, d6 black circle, f6 black circle, g6 white pawn, c5 black circle, d5 black cross, e5 white pawn, f5 black cross, g5 black circle, e4 white archbishop, f4 white pawn, c3 black circle, d3 black cross, f3 black cross, g3 black circle, c2 black pawn, d2 black circle, f2 black circle, g2 black cross, h1 black cross

The princess can move but not jump to squares with crosses, or it can capture the pawn on c2. It can jump to squares with dots, and it can capture the pawn on c2.

Position: a8 black cross, b7 black cross, h7 black cross, c6 black cross, d6 black circle, f6 black circle, g6 black cross, c5 black circle, d5 black cross, f5 black cross, g5 black circle, e4 white archbishop, c3 black circle, d3 black cross, f3 black cross, g3 black circle, c2 black cross, d2 black circle, f2 black circle, g2 black cross, b1 black cross, h1 black cross

Maximum range of a princess on an empty board

== History and nomenclature ==
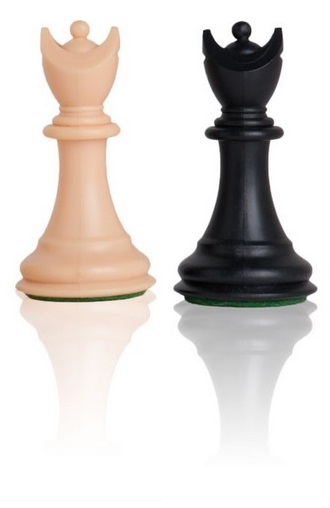
Staunton-style princess pieces. Many other designs have been used, usually based on the name used for the piece in each variant.

The princess is one of the most simply described fairy chess pieces and as such has a long history and has gone by many names. It was first used in Turkish Great Chess, a large medieval variant of chess, where it was called the vizir (not to be confused with the piece more commonly referred to as the wazir today, which is the (1,0) leaper). It was introduced in the West with Carrera's chess, a chess variant from 1617, where it was called a centaur, (Note: The game seems to have been an afterthought to his chess treatise and it is mysterious to what extent, if any, he might have used it in practice while he lived, viz. Capablanca Chess.) and has been used in many chess variants since then.

The name archbishop was introduced by José Raúl Capablanca in his large variant Capablanca chess. He originally called it the chancellor, but he later changed the names, and the rook + knight compound became known as the chancellor. Both of these names refer to higher ranks than the bishop in the Roman Catholic Church, but archbishop is more obvious to most people and thus became more popular. In fact, the name archbishop has been used for other augmented bishops as well, such as the reflecting bishop (which reflects off the sides of the board) and the bishop+king compound. Christian Freeling, the inventor of Grand Chess, took a similar approach to Capablanca, naming the piece the cardinal.

Princess is the most widely used name among problemists. By analogy with the queen, which is a rook+bishop compound, it was decided that the three basic combinations of the three simple chess pieces (rook, knight, and bishop) should all be named after female royalty. Since the bishop+knight compound is obviously weaker than the rook+knight compound (as the bishop is weaker than the rook), the name princess was assigned to the bishop+knight compound, while the rook+knight compound was named the empress.

== Value ==
Position: g8 black king, c6 white archbishop, g6 white king

White to move can force mate in two with 1.He7+ Kh8 2.Hf6#.

Position: a8 black king, d7 white archbishop, g1 white king

1.Hc6#

The princess is worth approximately 8 pawns, one less than a queen. Computer self-play studies show that a single pawn is enough to compensate for the difference between queen and princess on an 8×8 board, as well as that, on 10×8 boards, princess plus pawn even has a slight advantage over queen. This may seem counterintuitive, as the value difference of these pieces' non-bishop components (rook vs. knight) is closer to 2 pawns, implying a considerable synergy between the bishop and knight move. A mathematical approach used to determine relative piece value in Musketeer Chess estimated the value of the princess as 770 centipawns on an 8x8 board.

Princess versus rook is usually a draw, as is queen versus princess. King and princess versus king is a forced win for the side with the princess; checkmate can be forced within 17 moves. In comparison, the queen requires 10 moves and the rook requires 16. A princess can checkmate a lone king without the aid of its king in a position where the enemy king is in the corner and the princess is two spaces diagonally away from it, but this position cannot be forced.

Ralph Betza (inventor of Chess with different armies, in which the princess was used in one of the armies) rated the princess as about seven points, intermediate between a rook and a queen, noting that it was "a weak Queen" and that its 12 directions of movement are greater than the queen's 8 directions. However, all three of his alternate armies for that game are stronger than the standard FIDE army which they were supposed to equal, reflecting the general tendency for players to undervalue pieces that they are unfamiliar with; Larry Kaufman commented that this is particularly true for the princess.

== Symbol ==
Both white and black symbols for the princess were added to version 12 of the Unicode standard in March 2019, in the Chess Symbols block:

🩐 U+1FA50 WHITE CHESS KNIGHT-BISHOP
🩓 U+1FA53 BLACK CHESS KNIGHT-BISHOP

== See also ==
- Amazon – A queen + knight compound
- Empress – A rook + knight compound
- Queen – A rook + bishop compound, from Orthodox chess
