= Pietro Carrera =

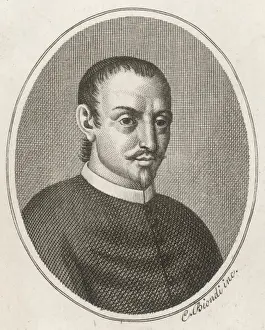
- Born: 12 July 1573 Militello in Val di Catania, Sicily, Italy
- Died: 18 September 1647 (aged 74) Messina, Sicily, Italy
- Occupation: chess player, historian, priest, author

Pietro Carrera (July 12, 1573 – September 18, 1647) was an Italian chess player, historian, priest and author.

== Biography ==
Pietro Carrera born in Sicily, in Militello in Val di Catania (Province of Catania), located in the Valley of Noto; here he grew up in the old colony of San Vito. He was the son of Donna Antonia Severino (mother) and Mariano Carrera, a traditional craftsman who entered the priesthood after his wife's death. During his studies in the Seminario Diocesiano of Siracusa, he had the opportunity to visit many different Sicilian cities. As a result of his travels he met Paolo Boi, so-called "The Siracusan", in the town of Palermo during 1597.

After taking his vows, he first become the chaplain at the church of S. Maria della Stella and later of Francesco Branciforte's Court (the Prince of Pietraperzia and Marchese of Militello). During his stay at Branciforte's Court he became interested in chess, winning against Salvatore Albino the so-called "Beneventano" and against Geronimo Cascio. Cascio won against the famous but old Polerio. After developing a fond relationship with the Prince's wife, Lady Giovanna, he composed a short poem for her in Latin in hexameter form regarding chess. Only fragments of this poem, the title being "The Pessopedia", remain today.

In 1617 he wrote and published Il Gioco degli Scacchi (The Game of Chess), subdivided into eight books where "learning the rules, the odds, the endgames, the blindfold chess and a discussion about the true origins of chess in itself", in course of that discussion mentioning in passing Italian and Spanish Draughts. This was the first book ever printed in Militello, on request of his patron Branciforte, by Giovanni Rosso from Trento; in this poem Carrera collected and elaborated in a systematic fashion information given by previous authors.

After the Prince of Branciforte's death in 1622, he moved to Messina, then to Canicattì and finally to Catania. Here in 1635, using an alias, he published the "Risposta di Valentino Vespaio contro l'apologia di Alessandro Salvio" ("Valentino Vespaio's answer against Alessandro Salvio's explanation"), where he debated the accusations and criticisms made against him from Salvio.

Famous and esteemed, he died on September 18, 1647, in Messina.

Carrera is also remembered as the inventor of chess variant (Carrera's chess) on an 8x10 chessboard, in which there were added two new pieces called the "Champion" (a combination of the moves of the tower (rook) and the knight) and "Centaurus" (a combination of the bishop and the knight); these innovations had more fame than the ones made by Piacenza (which follows his idea of introducing fairy pieces into the ordinary game) and Marinelli. Out of the context of Il Gioco degli Scacchi (The Game of Chess), where he previously describes odds of the weaker player playing with a royal crowned knight, this form of odds being the one he famously considered improper because it allows the odds-receiver to use their king to checkmate the enemy king from a knight's move away, or an Amazon, these pieces are easy to criticize as almost arbitrary, especially the "Champion" (the combination of the moves of the tower (rook) and the knight, which is a more awkward queen). Even in context, even though the precise specifications of the proposed game are beside his own implied point that it makes a better game for both players to play chess with the same fairy piece(s) than for only the weaker player to play with it/them by way of odds, it is nevertheless logical to criticize them as somewhat forced given that Italian draughts was still the more popular game in 17th-century Sicily and influence from Spanish draughts was responsible for the great reform of medieval chess, these being the same games he previously mentions in passing. It was a predecessor of Capablanca Chess.

He is not primarily remembered as a strong over-the-board player, but rather as a leading chess theorist and a valuable source of information on contemporary players of his era.

== See also ==
- Chess piece relative value
