= Amazon (chess) =

Fairy chess piece

White amazon

Black amazon

Common icons used in diagrams

The amazon, also known as the queen+knight compound or sometimes the dragon (a name sometimes used for the princess) or the superqueen, is a fairy chess piece that can move like a queen or a knight. It may thus be considered the sum of all orthodox chess pieces other than the king (because it cannot castle and does not know when it is under threat via the check rule) and the pawn (because it cannot practice en passant). The amazon can force checkmate on an enemy king without the help of any other friendly piece.

Chess moves in this article use A as notation for the amazon.

== Movement ==
	a	b	c	d	e	f	g	h
8	a8 black cross	b8	c8	d8	e8 black cross	f8	g8	h8	8
7	a7	b7 black cross	c7	d7	e7 black cross	f7	g7	h7 black cross	7
6	a6	b6	c6 black cross	d6 black circle	e6 black cross	f6 black circle	g6 black cross	h6	6
5	a5	b5	c5 black circle	d5 black cross	e5 black cross	f5 black cross	g5 black circle	h5	5
4	a4 black cross	b4 black cross	c4 black cross	d4 black cross	e4 A l	f4 black cross	g4 black cross	h4 black cross	4
3	a3	b3	c3 black circle	d3 black cross	e3 black cross	f3 black cross	g3 black circle	h3	3
2	a2	b2	c2 black cross	d2 black circle	e2 black cross	f2 black circle	g2 black cross	h2	2
1	a1	b1 black cross	c1	d1	e1 black cross	f1	g1	h1 black cross	1
	a	b	c	d	e	f	g	h

Moves of the amazon. It may jump to any square with a circle, or move as a rider to any square with a cross.

The amazon's movement combines those of the queen and the knight. Thus, it may move to any square on the same rank, file, or diagonal without jumping, or it may move to any of the nearest squares not on the same rank, file, or diagonal.

== History ==
The amazon is one of the most simply described fairy chess pieces and as such has a long history and has gone by many names. (Note: Other names the piece has acquired include angel, ayanu, commander, crown prince, elephant, empress, general, giraffe, grand chancellor, maharajah, rettah, royal guard, superqueen, tetra queen, and wyvern. Also omnipotent queen, and terror.) It was first used in Turkish Great Chess, a large medieval variant of chess, where it was called the giraffe. Later, it was widely experimented with in the Middle Ages to replace the slow ferz, and it competed with the modern queen for this role; the modern queen eventually won out, as the amazon's power was deemed excessive. In Russia, the amazon persisted into the 18th century; some players disapproved of this ability to "gallop like the horse" (knight). The book A History of Chess by H. J. R. Murray, page 384, says that one Mr. Coxe, who was in Russia in 1772, saw chess being played with the amazon.

The amazon is best known for its appearance in the chess variant Maharajah and the Sepoys, where it is the maharajah. It is royal and White's only piece.

== Value ==
	a	b	c	d	e	f	g	h
8	a8	b8 A d	c8	d8	e8	f8	g8	h8	8
7	a7	b7	c7	d7	e7	f7	g7	h7 black king	7
6	a6	b6	c6	d6	e6	f6	g6	h6	6
5	a5	b5	c5	d5 A l	e5	f5	g5	h5	5
4	a4	b4	c4	d4	e4	f4	g4	h4	4
3	a3	b3	c3	d3	e3	f3	g3	h3	3
2	a2	b2	c2	d2	e2	f2	g2	h2	2
1	a1 white king	b1	c1	d1	e1	f1	g1	h1	1
	a	b	c	d	e	f	g	h

White to move mates in one with 1.Af6# or 1.Af7#.

The amazon's value is estimated to be 12 or 13 points in the chess piece relative value system. The Amazon covers 35 squares, 27 squares from The Queen & 8 squares from The Knight. It is extremely mobile, can control every square surrounding itself in a 5×5 area, and can force checkmate by itself. In contrast, although the gryphon (or griffin) from Grande Acedrex (which moves one step diagonally before continuing outwards as a rook) would seem to have the value of two rooks (10–11 points), the squares it attacks are more dispersed, and it is more easily defended against than the amazon.

In the endgame of king and amazon versus king and empress (rook+knight compound), the amazon usually wins; however, in a few positions, the weaker side may force a draw by setting up a fortress. Such a fortress forces the side with the amazon to give perpetual check; otherwise, the side with the empress can force a simplification or give their own perpetual check. King and amazon versus king is a forced win for the side with the amazon; checkmate can be forced within four moves. In comparison, the queen requires 10 moves and the rook requires 16. In fact, the amazon does not even require its king's help to force checkmate (as an example of a checkmate position, the king is in the corner and the attacking amazon is a knight's move away from it), and this great power is the reason why it is not seen as often in chess variants as the princess or empress.

== Symbol ==
Both white and black symbols for the amazon were added to version 12 of the Unicode standard in March 2019, in the Chess Symbols block:

- U+1FA4E 🩎 WHITE CHESS KNIGHT-QUEEN
- U+1FA51 🩑 BLACK CHESS KNIGHT-QUEEN

== See also ==
- Empress – the rook+knight compound
- Princess – the bishop+knight compound
- Queen – the rook+bishop compound
