= Extinction chess =

Chess variant

Extinction chess is a chess variant invented by R. Wayne Schmittberger, (Note: Using pseudonym Paddy Smith.) editor of Games magazine, in 1985. Instead of checkmate as the winning condition, the object of the game is the elimination of all of a particular type of piece of the opponent.

== Rules ==
To win, the objective is any of the following:

- capture all the opponent's kings;
- capture all the opponent's queens;
- capture all the opponent's rooks;
- capture all the opponent's bishops;
- capture all the opponent's knights;
- eliminate all of the opponent's pawns, by capturing or by promotion.

A promoted pawn is considered no longer a pawn. By the same token, if a player already has a queen, and promotes a pawn to another queen, then both queens would need to be captured to make them extinct.

The king is not a special piece in this game, and it is legal to promote a pawn to a king. It is also legal to castle when in check, or to castle through check. The other rules of castling are the same: the king and the rook must not have previously moved, and there must be no pieces in between. Similarly, rooks, bishops, and queens may freely cross attacked squares, even if they are the last of their type.

If both sides suffer an extinction on the same move, which can happen if pawn promotion is involved, the player who caused the move wins. For example, White might have a last pawn on b7, and Black a last bishop on c8; then if White plays bxc8=Q, it causes the extinction of both the white pawns and the black bishops. In this case White is ruled to have won, as although both sides have fulfilled their winning conditions, it was a move by White that brought this situation about. (This is different from atomic chess, where you cannot explode your own king, even if the enemy king would also perish in the explosion.)

== Sample game ==
Position: a8 black rook, c8 black bishop, g8 black king, a7 black pawn, b7 black pawn, c7 black pawn, f7 black pawn, g7 black pawn, h7 black pawn, f6 black knight, b5 white pawn, e5 black pawn, c4 white bishop, d4 black rook, c2 white pawn, d2 white pawn, e2 white knight, f2 white pawn, g2 white pawn, h2 white pawn, a1 black queen, c1 white bishop, d1 white queen, f1 white rook, g1 white king

Final position

N.N. vs. Fabrice Liardet, Messigny 1998:
1. e4 d5 2. exd5 Qxd5 3. Nc3 Qa5 4. a3 e5 5. b4 Bxb4 6. axb4 Qxa1 7. Bc4 Nf6 8. Ba2? 0-0 9. Nge2 Rd8 10. Bc4 Nc6 11. b5 Nd4 12. 0-0 Nxe2 13. Nxe2 Rd4 0–1

White loses both bishops. Although "winning the exchange" is usually bad in Extinction Chess, the pin on the first rank in this case is very potent: White underestimated it and the black rook's swift arrival on the d-file.
