= Chess Symbols =

Unicode block

- Range: U+1FA00..U+1FA6F (112 code points)
- Plane: SMP
- Scripts: Common
- Symbol sets: Chess symbols Xiangqi symbols
- Assigned: 102 code points
- Unused: 10 reserved code points

Unicode version history
- 11.0 (2018): 14 (+14)
- 12.0 (2019): 98 (+84)
- 17.0 (2025): 102 (+4)

Unicode documentation
- Code chart ∣ Web page

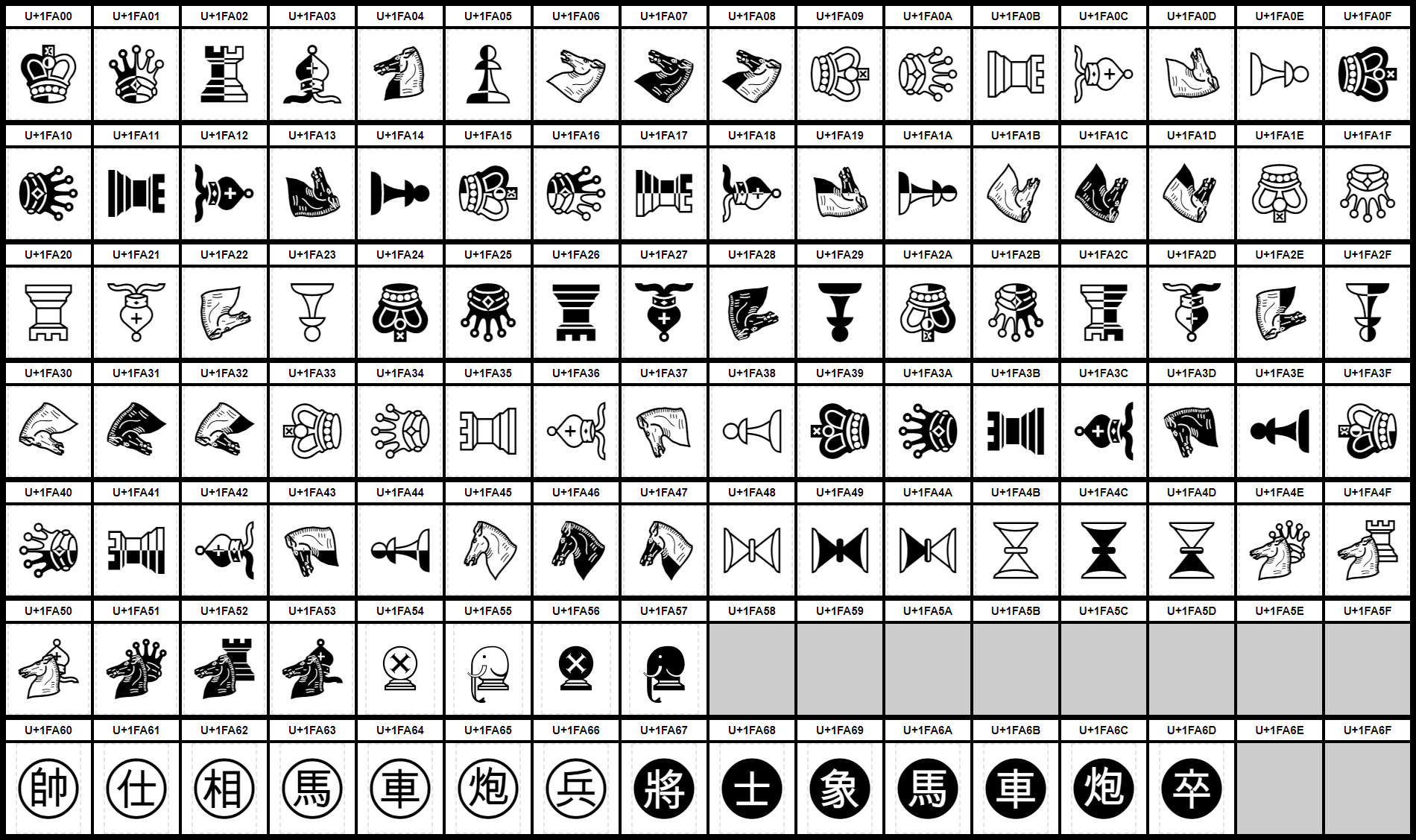
Graphical representation of the Chess Symbols Unicode block

Chess Symbols is a Unicode block containing characters for fairy chess and related notations beyond the basic Western chess symbols (U+2654 to U+265F) in the Miscellaneous Symbols block, as well as symbols representing game pieces for xiangqi (Chinese chess).

== Block ==
Chess Symbols^{[1]}^{[2]} Official Unicode Consortium code chart (PDF)
	0	1	2	3	4	5	6	7	8	9	A	B	C	D	E	F
U+1FA0x	🨀	🨁	🨂	🨃	🨄	🨅	🨆	🨇	🨈	🨉	🨊	🨋	🨌	🨍	🨎	🨏
U+1FA1x	🨐	🨑	🨒	🨓	🨔	🨕	🨖	🨗	🨘	🨙	🨚	🨛	🨜	🨝	🨞	🨟
U+1FA2x	🨠	🨡	🨢	🨣	🨤	🨥	🨦	🨧	🨨	🨩	🨪	🨫	🨬	🨭	🨮	🨯
U+1FA3x	🨰	🨱	🨲	🨳	🨴	🨵	🨶	🨷	🨸	🨹	🨺	🨻	🨼	🨽	🨾	🨿
U+1FA4x	🩀	🩁	🩂	🩃	🩄	🩅	🩆	🩇	🩈	🩉	🩊	🩋	🩌	🩍	🩎	🩏
U+1FA5x	🩐	🩑	🩒	🩓	🩔	🩕	🩖	🩗								
U+1FA6x	🩠	🩡	🩢	🩣	🩤	🩥	🩦	🩧	🩨	🩩	🩪	🩫	🩬	🩭		
Notes: 1. As of Unicode version 17.0; 2. Grey areas indicate non-assigned code points

== History ==
The following Unicode-related documents record the purpose and process of defining specific characters in the Chess Symbols block:

Version	Final code points (Note: Proposed code points and characters names may differ from final code points and names)	Count	L2 ID	WG2 ID	Document
11.0	U+1FA60..1FA6D	14	L2/10-368	N3910	Proposal for Encoding Chinese Chess Symbol in the SMP, 2010-09-16
11.0	U+1FA60..1FA6D	14	L2/10-463	N3966	Re: Proposal for encoding Chinese chess symbols, 2010-11-05
11.0	U+1FA60..1FA6D	14	L2/10-416R		Moore, Lisa (2010-11-09), "C.15", UTC #125 / L2 #222 Minutes
11.0	U+1FA60..1FA6D	14		N3992	R.O. Korea's Comments on "Proposal for Encoding Chinese Chess Symbol in the SMP (WG2 N3910)", 2011-03-03
11.0	U+1FA60..1FA6D	14		N3903 (pdf, doc)	"M57.28 (Chinese Chess symbols)", Unconfirmed minutes of WG2 meeting 57, 2011-03-31
11.0	U+1FA60..1FA6D	14		N4103	"11.8 Comments on N3910 "Proposal for Encoding Chinese Chess Symbols"", Unconfirmed minutes of WG 2 meeting 58, 2012-01-03
11.0	U+1FA60..1FA6D	14	L2/16-255	N4748	West, Andrew (2016-09-12), Proposal to encode Xiangqi game symbols
11.0	U+1FA60..1FA6D	14	L2/16-270	N4766	Everson, Michael (2016-09-28), Recommendations for encoding Xiàngqí game symbols
11.0	U+1FA60..1FA6D	14		N4873R (pdf, doc)	"10.3.10", Unconfirmed minutes of WG 2 meeting 65, 2018-03-16
11.0	U+1FA60..1FA6D	14	L2/16-325		Moore, Lisa (2016-11-18), "Consensus 149-C8", UTC #149 Minutes
11.0	U+1FA60..1FA6D	14	L2/17-161	N4794	Suignard, Michel (2017-05-08), "China T3, UK T7. Sub-clause 33", Draft disposition of comments on PDAM1.2 to ISO/IEC 10646 5th edition
11.0	U+1FA60..1FA6D	14	L2/17-103		Moore, Lisa (2017-05-18), "E.2.3 Xiangqi game symbols", UTC #151 Minutes
11.0	U+1FA60..1FA6D	14		N4953 (pdf, doc)	"M66.03d", Unconfirmed minutes of WG 2 meeting 66, 2018-03-23
11.0	U+1FA60..1FA6D	14	L2/17-353		Anderson, Deborah; Whistler, Ken (2017-10-02), "D. Chess Symbols", WG2 Consent Docket
11.0	U+1FA60..1FA6D	14	L2/17-362		Moore, Lisa (2018-02-02), "Consensus 153-C5", UTC #153 Minutes
12.0	U+1FA00..1FA53	84	L2/16-293		Wallace, Garth (2016-10-26), Proposal to Encode Heterodox Chess Symbols
12.0	U+1FA00..1FA53	84	L2/16-342		Anderson, Deborah; Whistler, Ken; Pournader, Roozbeh; Glass, Andrew; Iancu, Laurențiu (2016-11-07), "13. Chess", Recommendations to UTC #149 November 2016 on Script Proposals
12.0	U+1FA00..1FA53	84	L2/17-034R4	N4784R	Wallace, Garth; Everson, Michael (2017-03-28), Revised Proposal to Encode Heterodox Chess Symbols in the UCS
12.0	U+1FA00..1FA53	84	L2/17-153		Anderson, Deborah (2017-05-17), "22. Chess symbols", Recommendations to UTC #151 May 2017 on Script Proposals
12.0	U+1FA00..1FA53	84	L2/17-103		Moore, Lisa (2017-05-18), "E.2.1", UTC #151 Minutes
12.0	U+1FA00..1FA53	84		N4953 (pdf, doc)	"M66.07j", Unconfirmed minutes of WG 2 meeting 66, 2018-03-23
12.0	U+1FA00..1FA53	84	L2/17-362		Moore, Lisa (2018-02-02), "Consensus 153-C15", UTC #153 Minutes
17.0	U+1FA54..1FA57	4	L2/24-020		Bala, Gavin Jared; Miller, Kirk (2023-12-22), Unicode request for shatranj symbols
17.0	U+1FA54..1FA57	4	L2/24-013R		Anderson, Deborah; Goregaokar, Manish; Kučera, Jan; Whistler, Ken; Pournader, Roozbeh; Constable, Peter (2024-01-22), "13. Shatranj symbols", Recommendations to UTC #178 January 2024 on Script Proposals
17.0	U+1FA54..1FA57	4	L2/24-006		Constable, Peter (2024-01-31), "Consensus 178-C35", UTC #178 Minutes

== See also ==
- Chess symbols in Unicode
