= V. R. Parton =

English chess variant inventor (1897–1974)

- V. R. Parton demonstrating 3D chess to a reporter for the Birmingham Post, 9 September 1957
- Born: Vernon Rylands Parton; 2 October 1897; Cannock, Staffordshire, England
- Died: 31 December 1974 (aged 77); Liverpool, England
- Occupation: Teacher
- Known for: Alice chess; Chess variant invention

Vernon Rylands Parton (2 October 1897 – 31 December 1974) was an English chess enthusiast and prolific chess variant inventor, his most renowned variants being Alice chess and Racing Kings. Many of Parton's variants were inspired by the fictional characters and stories in the works of Lewis Carroll. Parton's formal education background, like Lewis Carroll's, was in mathematics. Parton's interests were wide and he was a great believer in Esperanto.

== Life ==
Parton's early education stemmed from his father's schools, where he also assisted. Parton's father was principal of Cannock Grammar School and a small international boarding school for children. After completing mathematics at Chester Teaching College, Parton returned to his father's school to give private instruction to older children in Latin, French, German, English, shorthand, typing, bookkeeping, and mathematics. In the 1920s he was left in charge of the school while his father returned to teach in state schools. Ill health cut short Parton's teaching career.

In 1960 Parton moved from Cannock to Liverpool, into a terraced house near Penny Lane, and published a series of nine monographs from 1961 to 1974 (also 1975 posthumously) detailing his inventions.

Parton died from emphysema at age 77 in Liverpool on 31 December 1974. The same year, variant inventor Philip M. Cohen created the variant Parton Chess in his honour.

Parton's nephew wrote:

I have distinct memories of sitting on his knee and listening to these [Lewis Carroll] stories, and not a book in sight.

I always knew him as a gentle and kindly person, and rarely saw one of his dark moods. He seemed to relate best to children.

I saw Vern often until about 1950, frequently accompanying him to his favorite location, the town library, or to the tobacconist, he having become a smoker. He seemed very reluctant to go out on his own. He had a favorite uncle, who was blind, and Vern was content to escort him around.

Vern never wanted to benefit financially from his work, but asked only for a contribution to charities for the blind.

— Peter Parton (nephew)

== Some chess variant inventions ==
=== Cubic chess ===
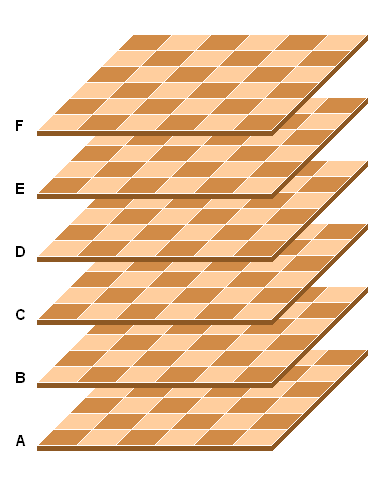
Cubic chess gamespace

In this 6×6×6 3D variant by Parton, boards are denoted A (bottom level) through F (top level). Each side has six pieces: king (K), queen (Q), bishop (B), unicorn (U), knight (N), and rook (R); and twelve pawns.

==== Game rules ====
Pieces move the same as in Raumschach, except that pawns move and capture one step forward (either orthogonally, diagonally, or vertexally), but not directly upward or downward. As in chess and Raumschach, the objective is checkmate.

- White's starting setup: KAa1, QAb1, BAc1, UAd1, NAe1, RAf1; pawns on Aa2–f2 and Ba1–f1
- Black's starting setup: KAf6, QAe6, BAd6, UAc6, NAb6, RAa6; pawns on Aa5–f5 and Ba6–f6

==== Variation ====
Parton made a variation of cubic chess for the same gameboard: In compulsion cubic chess, capture is compulsory, there are no checks, and the object is capture of the opposing king.

=== Alice chess ===
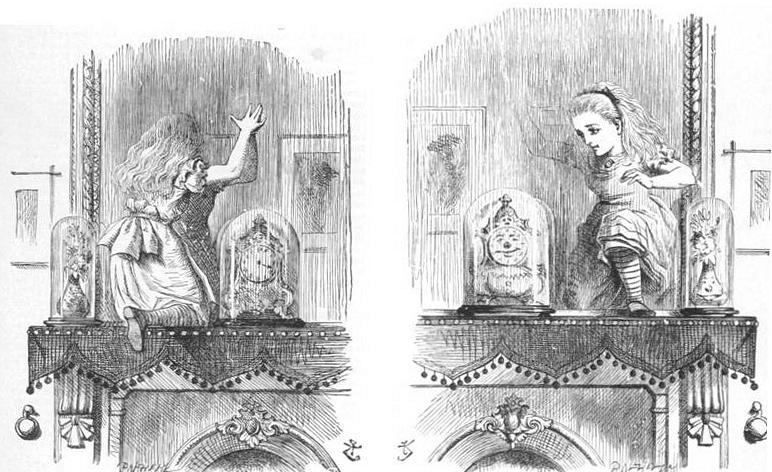
Alice steps through the looking-glass; illustration by Sir John Tenniel.

Parton's most famous chess variant, played on two adjacent chessboards. A piece that completes its move on one board automatically "vanishes strangely off its board to appear suddenly on the other board, magically out of thin air!" A move in Alice chess has two basic stipulations: the move must be legal on the board on which it is played, and the square transferred to on the opposite board must be vacant. (Consequently, capture is possible only on the board upon which a piece currently stands.)

Just as Alice encounters strange situations by passing through that looking-glass from reality to its reflection, so for Alician Chess a strange game is created by playing it on two separate boards! One board being as a looking-glass to the other, the resulting play is a game which has a character as fantastic perhaps as Alice's own game in Through the Looking-Glass. What a great loss it has been that Lewis Carroll never left his stamp on some idea for Chess! Whether he would approve of my using Alice's own name of the present game is an unsolvable problem.

— V. R. Parton, Curiouser and Curiouser (1961)

From D. B. Pritchard's Popular Chess Variants (2000):

This wonderful game, appropriately named after Lewis Carroll's eponymous heroine, was the inspiration of Vernon Parton. If you pass over every other game in this book, don't miss this one. Still, alas, little known, Alice chess, now almost a half-century old, continues to attract converts. The body of Alice players grows steadily.

=== Mad Threeparty chess ===
	a	b	c	d	e	f	g	h	i	j
10	a10	b10	c10	d10	e10	f10	g10	h10	i10	j10	10
9	a9	b9	c9	d9	e9	f9	g9	h9	i9	j9	9
8	a8	b8	c8	d8	e8	f8	g8	h8	i8	j8	8
7	a7	b7	c7	d7	e7	f7	g7	h7	i7	j7	7
6	a6	b6	c6	d6	e6	f6	g6	h6	i6	j6	6
5	a5	b5	c5	d5	e5	f5	g5	h5	i5	j5	5
4	a4	b4	c4	d4	e4	f4	g4	h4	i4	j4	4
3	a3	b3	c3	d3	e3	f3	g3	h3	i3	j3	3
2	a2	b2	c2	d2	e2	f2	g2	h2	i2	j2	2
1	a1	b1	c1	d1	e1	f1	g1	h1	i1	j1	1
	a	b	c	d	e	f	g	h	i	j

Mad Threeparty chess starts on an empty board.

This variant is for three (Note: "What are you three doing?" asked Alice. "We're going to have a Mad Three party" explained the Mad Hatter. Alice thought he must have meant "tea party". "Can I join you please in this party?" she asked politely, and with much curiosity over this painting with jam. "No, you can't" said the March Hare rather impolitely. "If you join, then it would be a Four party instead." Parton (1970) Part II, p. 6) players on a 10×10 board. Each player has a standard set of pieces in their own colour, including an extra king, (Note: "Each player has two Kings!" replied the Hatter very crossly at Alice's ignorance in this matter. "It is home-made plain cake commonsense. One of your opponents attacks one of your kings and the other attacks the other. That is quite easy to understand. If you had only a single king it would get too complicated when both of your opponents attacked the same king." He added with a glare of annoyance at Alice's obvious doubt about that point. "If they had only one teapot they would have to halve it, and what use is half a teapot? You seem as stupid as the Dormouse!" Parton (1970) Part II, p. 7) but no pawns.

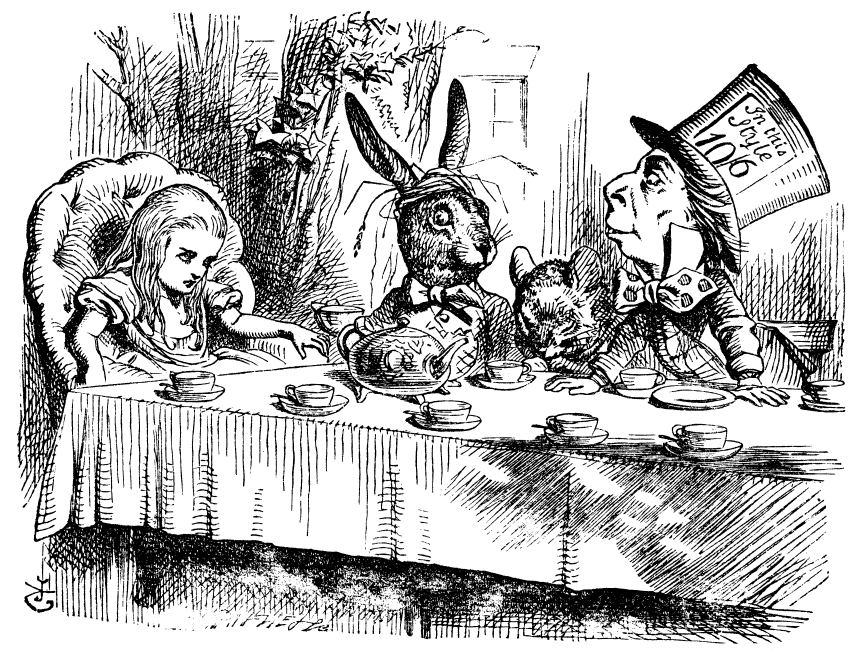
The Mad Hatter's tea party; illustration by Sir John Tenniel

==== Game rules ====
The board starts empty. Players take turns, in clockwise rotation around the board, placing one of their pieces on any vacant square. Kings are placed last, but must not be placed in check.

The two kings of each player are marked differently. (For example, of a player's two kings, one might be marked with a star.) Each player attacks the marked king of the opponent to their left, and the unmarked king of the opponent to their right. It is not permitted to check the opponents' other kings.

The first player to checkmate a king wins the game.

=== Tweedle chess ===
	a	b	c	d	e	f	g	h	i	j
10	a10 black rook	b10 black knight	c10 black bishop	d10 black king	e10 black queen	f10 black queen	g10 black king	h10 black bishop	i10 black knight	j10 black rook	10
9	a9 black pawn	b9 black pawn	c9 black pawn	d9 black pawn	e9 black pawn	f9 black pawn	g9 black pawn	h9 black pawn	i9 black pawn	j9 black pawn	9
8	a8	b8	c8	d8	e8	f8	g8	h8	i8	j8	8
7	a7	b7	c7	d7	e7	f7	g7	h7	i7	j7	7
6	a6	b6	c6	d6	e6	f6	g6	h6	i6	j6	6
5	a5	b5	c5	d5	e5	f5	g5	h5	i5	j5	5
4	a4	b4	c4	d4	e4	f4	g4	h4	i4	j4	4
3	a3	b3	c3	d3	e3	f3	g3	h3	i3	j3	3
2	a2 white pawn	b2 white pawn	c2 white pawn	d2 white pawn	e2 white pawn	f2 white pawn	g2 white pawn	h2 white pawn	i2 white pawn	j2 white pawn	2
1	a1 white rook	b1 white knight	c1 white bishop	d1 white king	e1 white queen	f1 white queen	g1 white king	h1 white bishop	i1 white knight	j1 white rook	1
	a	b	c	d	e	f	g	h	i	j

Tweedle chess board and starting setup

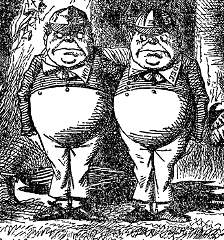
Tweedledum and Tweedledee; illustration by Sir John Tenniel

Also known as twin orthodox chess or double-king chess, each player has two kings (Note: "When first Alice had met Dee and Dum, these two little fat men looked exactly like a couple of great schoolboys. On this occasion, however, each of them had on his head, not a school cap but an oversized king's crown! (From the Alice unwritten)" Parton (1961), p. 13) and two queens on a 10×10 board. A player wins by checkmating either one of the opposing kings. (Note: "[...] the two Tweedle kings in the same force are exactly the same in status and in dignity; and equally have the same vital role to play during the conflict between the two colours. The checkmate of one of this player's Tweedles is at once destruction for its fellow Tweedle, as they share jointly the victory or disaster resulting from the struggle." Parton (1974), p. 9)

==== Game rules ====
The normal chess rules apply, except that kings and rooks can only castle "short" (i.e. with kings shifting two squares toward the nearest corner), and pawns can move one or two steps at any stage.

==== Comments ====
"While his pair of Queens will provide the player's main hopes for victory, his twin monarchs King Tweedledee and King Tweedledum jointly provide his sequence of headaches!" (Parton 1961:14) Parton makes note that the only way a player can escape mate from a fork on his two kings is by capturing the checking piece. (Note: "[...] a player may have to face the terrible menace where check is made simultaneously on both of his monarchs by a single enemy. If he is to save his game, then this player so doubly checked must obliterate the check against each Tweedle; in which terrible situation the only saving defence is to capture that foe checking, if such escaping move happily exists." Parton (1974), p. 9)

Boyer remarked that the variant yields "magnificent games" because there are two directions of attack and two points to defend.

=== March Hare chess ===
Position: a8 black rook, b8 black knight, c8 black bishop, d8 black queen, e8 black king, f8 black bishop, g8 black knight, h8 black rook, a7 black pawn, b7 black pawn, c7 black pawn, d7 black pawn, e7 black pawn, f7 black pawn, g7 black pawn, h7 black pawn, a2 white pawn, b2 white pawn, c2 white pawn, d2 white pawn, e2 white pawn, f2 white pawn, g2 white pawn, h2 white pawn, a1 white rook, b1 white knight, c1 white bishop, d1 white queen, e1 white king, f1 white bishop, g1 white knight, h1 white rook

March Hare chess startup appears normal.

In this variant, a player first moves one of their own pieces, "and then 'meddles' with his opponent's men". (Pritchard 2007:62)

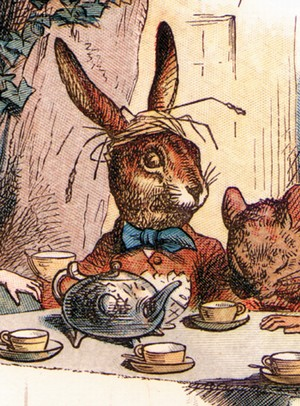
The March Hare; (Note: "Two days wrong!" sighed the Hatter about his watch. "I told you butter wouldn't suit the works," he added, looking angrily at the March Hare. "It was the best butter," the March Hare meekly replied. "Yes, but some crumbs must have got in as well," the Hatter grumbled, "you shouldn't have put it in with the bread-knife." The March Hare took the watch and looked at it gloomily; then he dipped it in his cup of tea and looked at it again, but he could think of nothing better to say than his first remark "It was the best butter." Parton (1961), p. 24 (paraphrased Alice's Adventures in Wonderland (Chapter 7), "A Mad Tea-Party")) illustration by Sir John Tenniel

==== Game rules ====
For each turn, a player makes two moves: he first moves one of his own pieces, then one of his opponent's.

- If a player moves one of his pawns, then he may move any enemy piece, including the enemy king. (Parton 1961:24)
- If a player moves his queen, rook, bishop, or knight, then he must move an enemy pawn.
- If a player moves his king, then he may move any enemy piece except the enemy king.

When in check, a player must get out of check immediately on his turn by moving one of his own men. (If he cannot legally do so, he loses the game.)

=== Cheshire Cat chess ===
	a	b	c	d	e	f	g	h	i	j
10	a10 black rook	b10 black rook	c10 black knight	d10 black bishop	e10 black queen	f10 black king	g10 black bishop	h10 black knight	i10 black rook	j10 black rook	10
9	a9 black pawn	b9 black pawn	c9 black pawn	d9 black pawn	e9 black pawn	f9 black pawn	g9 black pawn	h9 black pawn	i9 black pawn	j9 black pawn	9
8	a8	b8	c8	d8	e8	f8	g8	h8	i8	j8	8
7	a7	b7	c7	d7	e7	f7	g7	h7	i7	j7	7
6	a6	b6	c6	d6	e6	f6	g6	h6	i6	j6	6
5	a5	b5	c5	d5	e5	f5	g5	h5	i5	j5	5
4	a4	b4	c4	d4	e4	f4	g4	h4	i4	j4	4
3	a3	b3	c3	d3	e3	f3	g3	h3	i3	j3	3
2	a2 white pawn	b2 white pawn	c2 white pawn	d2 white pawn	e2 white pawn	f2 white pawn	g2 white pawn	h2 white pawn	i2 white pawn	j2 white pawn	2
1	a1 white rook	b1 white rook	c1 white knight	d1 white bishop	e1 white queen	f1 white king	g1 white bishop	h1 white knight	i1 white rook	j1 white rook	1
	a	b	c	d	e	f	g	h	i	j

Cheshire Cat chess board and starting setup

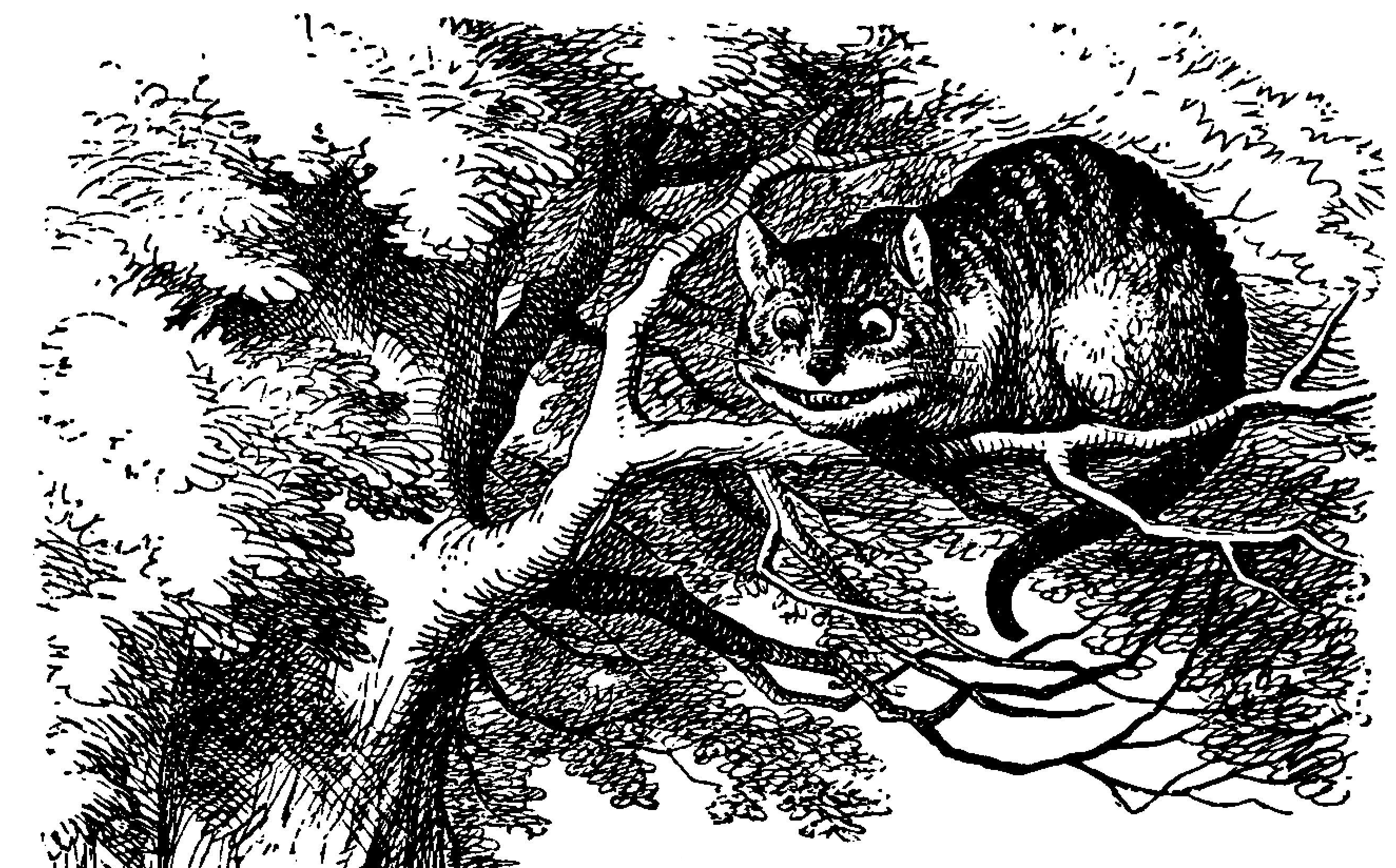
The mysterious Cheshire Cat appears ...

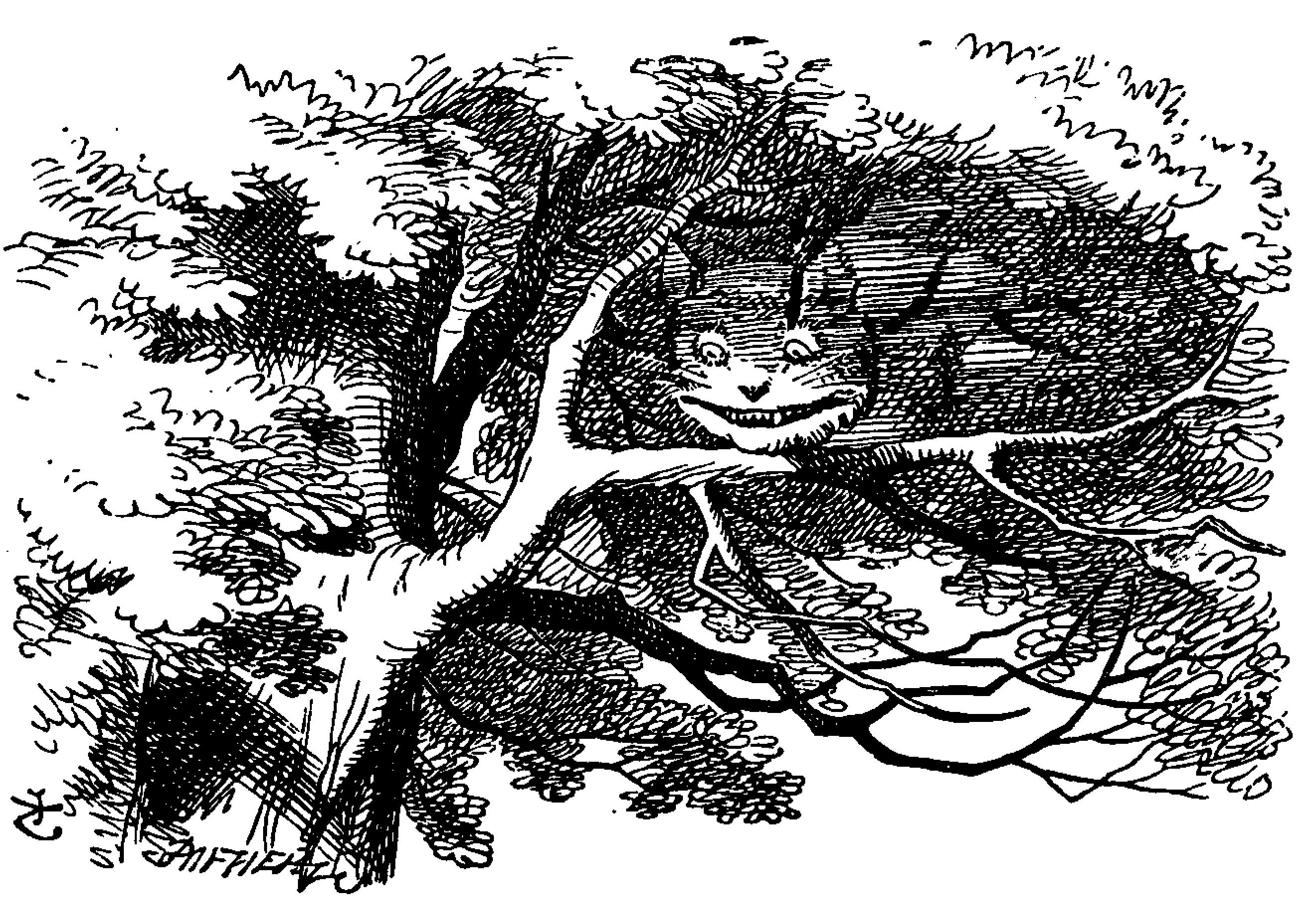
... then disappears; (Note: "[...] she looked up, and there was the Cat again, sitting on a branch of a tree. 'Did you say pig, or fig?' said the Cat. 'I said pig,' replied Alice; 'and I wish you wouldn't keep appearing and vanishing so suddenly: you make one quite giddy.' 'All right,' said the Cat; and this time it vanished quite slowly, beginning with the end of the tail, and ending with the grin, which remained some time after the rest of it had gone." Alice's Adventures in Wonderland (Chapter 6), "Pig and Pepper") illustrations by Sir John Tenniel.

==== Game rules ====
In this variant, all normal chess rules apply, except: Whenever a piece moves from its square, then that particular square "disappears". (Note: "In a real Alician Tale, I would obviously invite the Carpenter with the Walrus to help him if needed, to saw such a square out of a wooden chessboard." Parton (1970) Part II, p. 1)

Parton suggests using checker pieces to mark "disappeared" squares. Once vanished, a square may not be occupied again; however, pieces may move through disappeared square(s), including giving check through them.

Since castling is impossible in Cheshire Cat Chess (pieces which normally clear a path for castling cause needed squares to "disappear"), Parton permits the kings to be moved like queens once per game, on their first move.

==== Variation ====
The game can also be played using a regular 8×8 board and set, but Parton suggests the 10×10 board with two extra rooks in the corners as "best".

=== Co-regal chess ===
Position: a8 black rook, b8 black knight, c8 black bishop, d8 black queen, e8 black king, f8 black bishop, g8 black knight, h8 black rook, a7 black pawn, b7 black pawn, c7 black pawn, d7 black pawn, e7 black pawn, f7 black pawn, g7 black pawn, h7 black pawn, a2 white pawn, b2 white pawn, c2 white pawn, d2 white pawn, e2 white pawn, f2 white pawn, g2 white pawn, h2 white pawn, a1 white rook, b1 white knight, c1 white bishop, d1 white queen, e1 white king, f1 white bishop, g1 white knight, h1 white rook

Co-regal chess startup appears normal.

In this variant, the queens are subject to check and checkmate the same as kings. (Note: "The essential feature of this Alician theme is that, as a co-regal piece, a Queen will now become fully subject to all rules relating to check and checkmate exactly as is her King. No longer will her Majesty the Queen suffer that indignity of being roughly captured by some inferior enemy piece, and then thrown most ungracefully for any lady, into the chessbox like a common Bishop!" Parton (1970) Part I, p. 2) (Note: "An early blow struck on behalf of sexual equality." (Pritchard 1994:72))

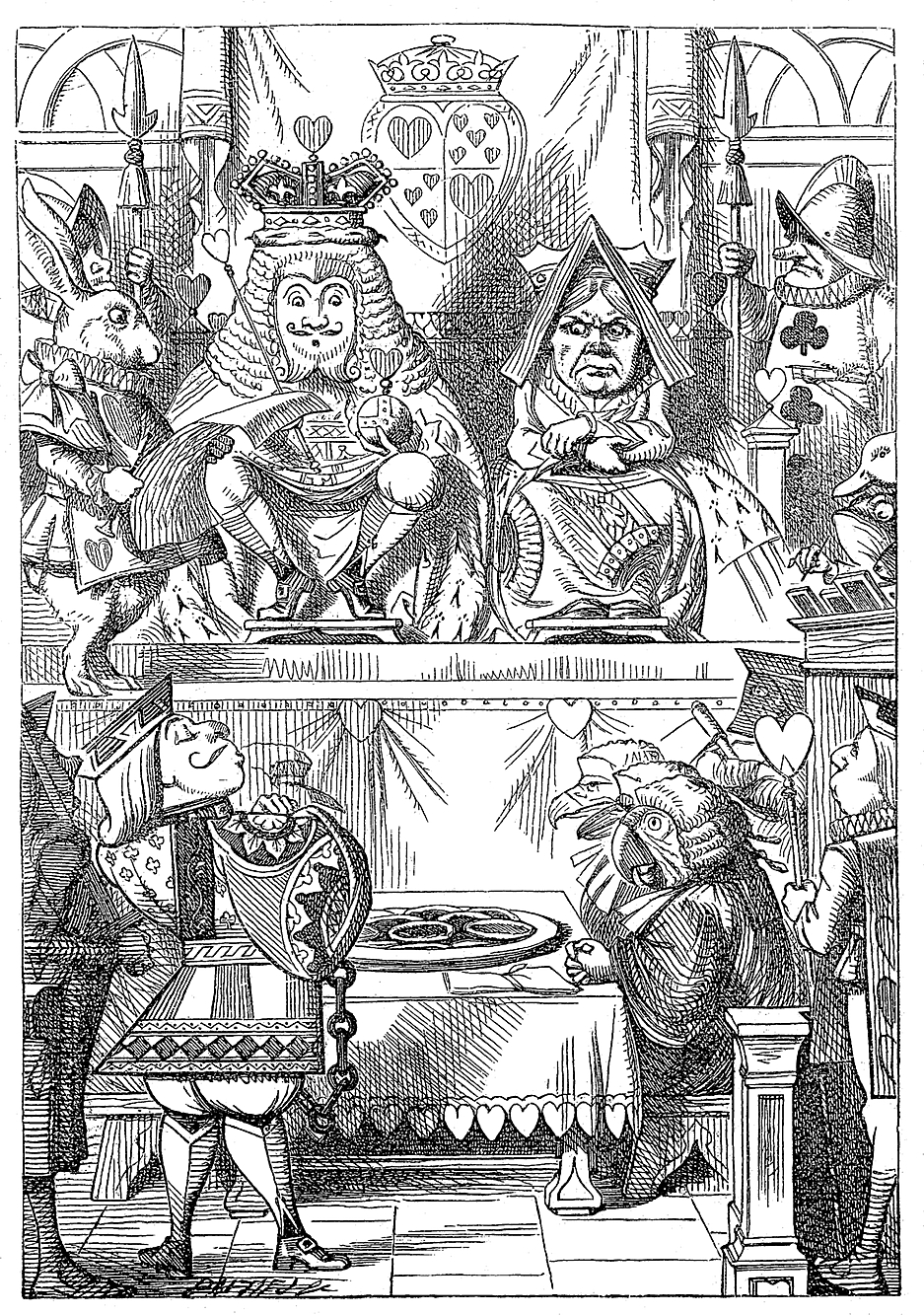
The often-displeased Queen of Hearts; illustration by Sir John Tenniel

==== Game rules ====
Checkmate of the opponent's king or queen wins the game. The queen moves and captures as a normal queen, but may not put itself in check. The queen may pass over attacked squares.

Amplified rules by NOST (Note: NOST (kNights of the Square Table), a (now defunct) correspondence game club formed in 1960 by Bob Lauzon and Jim France, enjoyed several hundred active members (Pritchard 1994:210).)

A queen, the result of a pawn promotion, is royal. A queen may check a king from a distance, but may not check a queen. Both kings and queens may castle long or short.

==== Comments ====
"It will be seen that difficulties for a 'checkmate' of the hostile Queen must chiefly arise from her great mobility which enables her to escape to safety with some degree of ease, in contrast with the King's poor slow power to move out of grave dangers. Victory in Co-regal will be in general achieved by checkmate of the enemy King. [...] A player must acquire two new habits at least. He must crush all his desires to make some brilliant Queen sacrifice. When he attacks the hostile co-regal Queen, he is obliged to give the polite word 'check' as warning!" (Parton 1970a, Part I:2)

==== Sample game ====
Walter Whiteman vs. Rib Orrell:
1.e4 Nf6 2.Nc3 e5 3.Nf3 Bc5 4.Bc4 Ng4 5.0-0 Nxf2+ 6.Rxf2 Bxf2+ 7.Kxf2 0-0 8.d3 d6 9.Ng5 Be6 10.Bxe6 fxe6+ 11.Ke1 h6 12.Nxe6+ Qh4+ 13.g3+?? Qxh2 0–1 "Black threatens 14...Qg/h1 mate since a K move is illegal as it exposes the Q to check. If 14.Qg4 (only legal move for Q) Rf2 15.Ne2 (forced: Qxg7 is not mate—it's illegal!) Rxe2+ and mate in three." (Pritchard 1994:72)

=== Racing Kings ===
Position: a2 black king, b2 black rook, c2 black bishop, d2 black knight, e2 white knight, f2 white bishop, g2 white rook, h2 white king, a1 black queen, b1 black rook, c1 black bishop, d1 black knight, e1 white knight, f1 white bishop, g1 white rook, h1 white queen

Racing Kings starting setup (Note: "The starting position and the fact that there are no pawns marks it further as a game out of the ordinary. [...] it is one of the more inspired creations of Vernon Parton, a prolific inventor of odd games." (Pritchard 2000:14))

This game was the original Dodo chess before being renamed. The rules are the same as Dodo chess, but there is a different board setup.

==== Sample game ====
R. Betza vs. J. Leitel:
1.Bd4 Be4 2.Kh3 Ka3 3.Nxc1 Rxc1 4.Be2? Nb3 5.Bh8? Ka4 6.Kg4 Ka5 7.Qh6 Rc6 8.Qe3 Rxe2 9.Qxe4! Qxh8? 10.Qxc6 Qc3 11.Qh6 Rxe1 12.Rxe1 Qxe1 13.Kf5 Qe7 14.Qe6 Qb7 15.Kg6 Nc5 16.Qf7 Ka6 17.Kh7 Ka7 18.Rg8 (18.Kg8 only draws) 1–0

Parton suggests also that play can be extended to a "double course", where a player wins by being first to go to the eighth rank and then return to the first.

=== Dodo chess ===
Position: a2 white rook, b2 white bishop, c2 white knight, f2 black knight, g2 black bishop, h2 black rook, a1 white king, b1 white bishop, c1 white knight, f1 black knight, g1 black bishop, h1 black king

Dodo chess starting setup

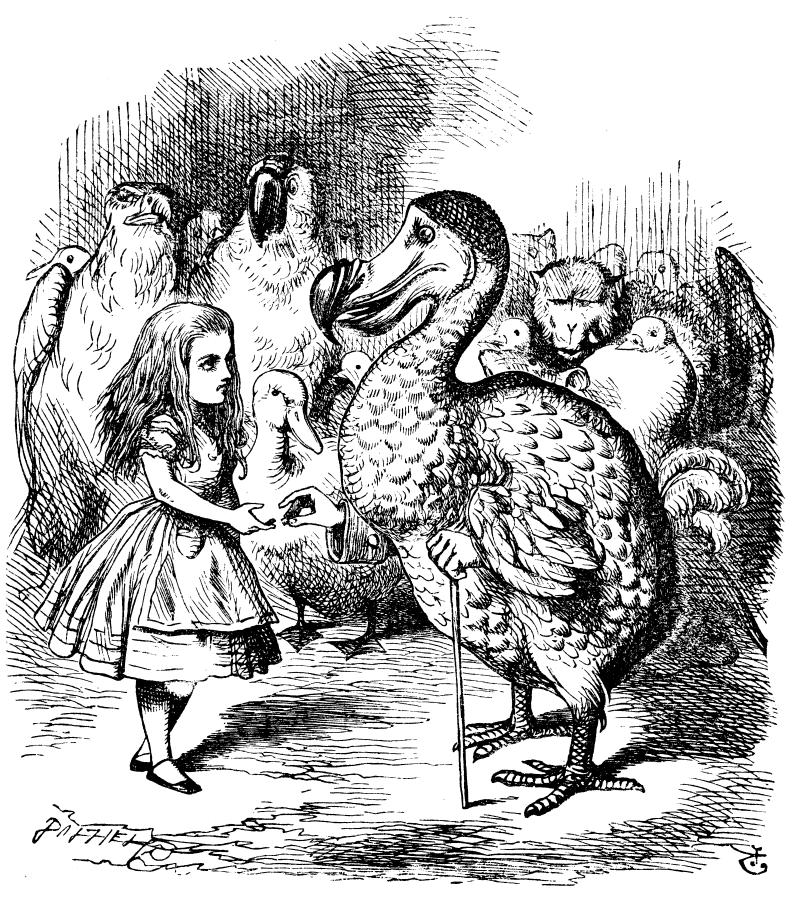
The flightless Dodo; illustration by Sir John Tenniel

Played on a regular chessboard, this variant is a simple race game: the first player to reach a square on the last rank with his king is the winner. (Note: "The peculiarity of Dodo Chess is that the purpose of play is a sort of racing competition between the Kings (such an idea was naturally expected of the Dodo)." Parton (1970) Part I, p. 12) (Note: "'What I was going to say,' said the Dodo in an offended tone, 'was, that the best thing to get us dry would be a Caucus-race.' 'What is a Caucus-race?' said Alice; not that she wanted much to know, but the Dodo had paused as if it thought that somebody ought to speak, and no one else seemed inclined to say anything. 'Why,' said the Dodo, 'the best way to explain it is to do it.'" Alice's Adventures in Wonderland (Chapter 3), "A Caucus-Race and a Long Tale") (Note: "That quite extinct bird was on this occasion explaining to the White and Red Kings how they ought to play chess according to its rules. The Dodo earnestly and with many tears begged Alice to write down these special rules in her memorandum book, in order that the game of Dodo Chess, quite unlike the poor bird itself should never, never, never at all become extinct." Parton (1970) Part I, p. 12)

==== Game rules ====
Checking is not permitted, neither is exposing one's own king to check. Captures are allowed, however, as in normal chess.

"By way of compensating for the first move (always an advantage in a race game) if White gets there first but Black follows on the next move the game is a draw." (Pritchard 2000:14)

=== Kinglet chess ===
Position: a8 black rook, b8 black knight, c8 black bishop, d8 black queen, e8 black king, f8 black bishop, g8 black knight, h8 black rook, a7 black pawn, b7 black pawn, c7 black pawn, d7 black pawn, e7 black pawn, f7 black pawn, g7 black pawn, h7 black pawn, a2 white pawn, b2 white pawn, c2 white pawn, d2 white pawn, e2 white pawn, f2 white pawn, g2 white pawn, h2 white pawn, a1 white rook, b1 white knight, c1 white bishop, d1 white queen, e1 white king, f1 white bishop, g1 white knight, h1 white rook

Kinglet chess startup appears normal. (Note: Or, Parton suggests the players' back row of pieces may be randomized for an equally playable startup (Pritchard 1994:159).)

Also known as imperial fiddlesticks, there is no checking or checkmate in kinglet chess – kings are treated like any normal piece. (Note: "Kings retain their ordinary move, of course, but they are now humiliated as it were, by being treated on the same level as the rest of the chessmen. In this game a King can suffer the indignity of being captured and lifted off the board and dropped into the chessbox, just as the White King was unceremoniously lifted up by Alice in her story." Parton (1961), p. 4) The winner is the first player to capture all the opponent's kinglets (i.e. pawns or Fiddlesticks).

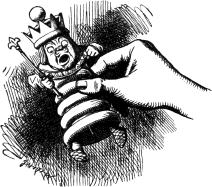
Alice picks up the White King; illustration by Sir John Tenniel.

==== Additional rules ====
When reaching the last rank, a kinglet promotes to a king. If a player is forced to promote his last kinglet, he is then without any kinglets so automatically loses. All pieces including kings are subject to capture. Stalemate is a draw.

==== Comments ====
"The idea contains some interesting problems in tactics. The balance between rushing to capture Fiddlesticks [pawns] quickly and fear of becoming defenceless thereby, (loss of major pieces) seems to be subtle and delicate." (Parton 1961:4)

==== Variations ====
Parton suggests two "less subtle" variations in Curiouser and Curiouser, one based on Progressive chess where players make an increasing number of moves per turn, and the other based on Marseillais chess where players move two pieces per turn, at least one of which must be a kinglet (or, the same kinglet may be moved twice).

=== Looking-glass chess ===
a8	b8	c8	d8	e8	f8	g8	h8
a7	b7	c7	d7	e7	f7	g7	h7
a6	b6	c6	d6	e6	f6	g6	h6
a5	b5	c5	d5	e5	f5	g5	h5
a4	b4	c4	d4	e4	f4	g4	h4
a3	b3	c3	d3	e3	f3	g3	h3
a2	b2	c2	d2	e2	f2	g2	h2
a1	b1	c1	d1	e1	f1	g1	h1

A

a8	b8	c8	d8	e8	f8	g8	h8
a7	b7	c7	d7	e7	f7	g7	h7
a6	b6	c6	d6	e6	f6	g6	h6
a5	b5	c5	d5	e5	f5	g5	h5
a4	b4	c4	d4	e4	f4	g4	h4
a3	b3	c3	d3	e3	f3	g3	h3
a2	b2	c2	d2	e2	f2	g2	h2
a1	b1	c1	d1	e1	f1	g1	h1

B

Looking-glass chess comprises two separate but interdependent games. Here White's first move was 1.Nf3/A and the reflected move 1.Nc3/B, and Black's response was 1...d5/B and the reflected move 1...e5/A.

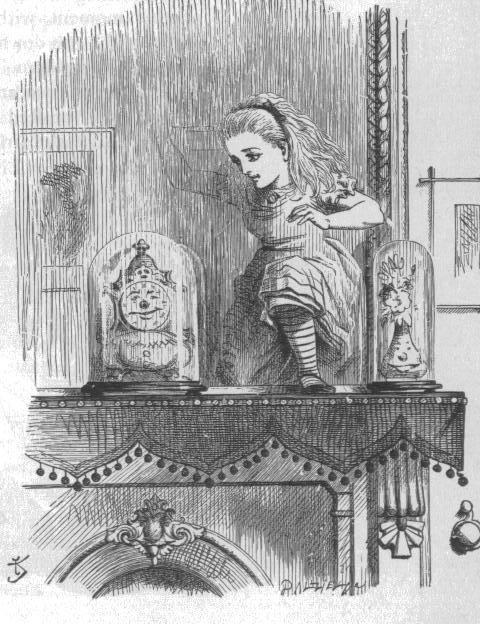
Alice discovers a reflected, alternate world; illustration by Sir John Tenniel.

Two separate games ensue in this Parton creation. A player may make any normal move on either board, and then must make the 'looking-glass' (reflected) move on the other board to complete his turn. (Note: "For some time the looking-glass was stubborn in its refusal to permit the Red Queen to pass through. At last, when the White Knight arrived and began to suggest that he might charge through on his horse with all their heavy armour, then the looking-glass agreed, but reluctantly, to allow them to pass through itself. Nevertheless, the condition which the looking-glass claimed on return was that Alice should write down there and then in her [memorandum] book, how the looking-glass saw the game of chess, both 'inside and outside' of course! For playing the 'Looking-glass Game', two chessboards and two ordinary sets of chessmen are required. The two boards are placed side by side, and between them is to be imagined the Looking-glass itself!" Parton (1970) Part II, p. 3)

==== Game rules ====
To illustrate, if White opens with 1.Nf3 on board A, then he must play 1.Nc3 on board B to complete his turn (see diagram). If a reflected move would put the player in check, then the first move may not be made.

The move of a king or queen must be mirrored on the other board, even if this means moving the king several squares. (For example, in the diagram if White captures 2.Nxe5/A Nxd5/B and Black recaptures 2...Qxd5/B, then Black's reflected move is: 2...Kxe5/A.)

Castling is normal, but then the reflected move must be executed to 'castle' the queen. (E.g. if White castles kingside, then reflected queenside castling results in the queen on b1 and the rook on c1.)

=== Gryphon chess ===
Position: a8 black rook, b8 black knight, c8 black bishop, d8 black queen, f8 black bishop, g8 black knight, h8 black rook, a7 black pawn, b7 black pawn, c7 black pawn, d7 black pawn, e7 black pawn, f7 black pawn, g7 black pawn, h7 black pawn, a2 white pawn, b2 white pawn, c2 white pawn, d2 white pawn, e2 white pawn, f2 white pawn, g2 white pawn, h2 white pawn, a1 white rook, b1 white knight, c1 white bishop, d1 white queen, f1 white bishop, g1 white knight, h1 white rook

Gryphon chess starts with kings omitted.

Also known as complicacious chess, at the end of a move, the moved piece transforms to a piece of a different type (the next in the series: pawn→knight→bishop→rook→queen→king). (Note: "An ordinary piece must have a very dull existence for it is always the same thing. Now look at me, am I not two things all at the same time?" Alice, looking at the Gryphon with its eagle's head and wings, but with its lion's body, thought to herself: "It isn't really two things at the same time, but only parts of these two things." She saw a grin slowly spreading about the creatures beak as a thought spread through its mind. Then it chuckled and said, half to itself and half to Alice: "What un-fun!" "What is the un-fun?" asked Alice with curiosity. "Ordinary pieces," replied the Gryphon. "It's all their un-fancy, of course; they hasn't got no metamorphosis. Indeed, the plain unvarnished truth of this fancy is that the pieces does change, and they does be complicacious." It repeated the word "complicacious" as if it found this word a tasty morsel to have in its beak. Parton (1961), "Gryphon's Fancy and Fun", p. 26) So after moving a pawn, the pawn transforms to a knight of the same colour. After moving a knight, it becomes a bishop; and so on. Kings do not transform.

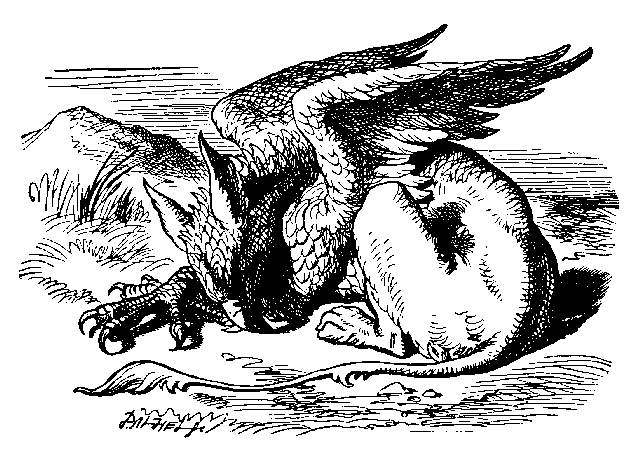
The Gryphon; illustration by Sir John Tenniel

==== Game rules ====
A player may have no more than four knights, four bishops, four rooks, or two queens on the board at any one time, but may have as many as fifteen kings. Checkmating any one of the enemy kings wins the game.

==== Comments ====
"It will be seen at once that a complicacious pawn reaches the status of kingship in five moves, whereas a complicacious Rook does so in two moves. [...] Naturally, a player will not capture the enemy Queen! Neither will he desire to move his own Queen, to provide the necessary target for his opponent to win by." (Parton 1961:26)

==== Variations ====
Position: a8 black rook, b8 black knight, c8 black bishop, d8 black queen, e8 black king, f8 black bishop, g8 black knight, h8 black rook, a7 black pawn, b7 black pawn, c7 black pawn, d7 black pawn, e7 black pawn, f7 black pawn, g7 black pawn, h7 black pawn, a2 white pawn, b2 white pawn, c2 white pawn, d2 white pawn, e2 white pawn, f2 white pawn, g2 white pawn, h2 white pawn, a1 white rook, b1 white knight, c1 white bishop, d1 white queen, e1 white king, f1 white bishop, g1 white knight, h1 white rook

Circular Gryphon chess

Position: e8 black king, a7 black pawn, b7 black pawn, c7 black pawn, d7 black pawn, e7 black pawn, f7 black pawn, g7 black pawn, h7 black pawn, a2 white pawn, b2 white pawn, c2 white pawn, d2 white pawn, e2 white pawn, f2 white pawn, g2 white pawn, h2 white pawn, e1 white king

Simplified Gryphon chess

In circular Gryphon chess, players have one king for the entire game as in normal chess. But the transformation sequence is changed and made circular: pawn→knight→bishop→rook→queen→pawn. (So, a piece can transform any number of times without limitation.) Again, no more than four knights, four bishops, four rooks, or two queens are permitted in play at any one time.

In simplified Gryphon chess, players start with their king and eight pawns. "The pawns change through the regular Gryphon order and terminate in kingship. Until a player has captured an enemy piece, he is forbidden to move his king sideways or backwards." (Parton 1974:17)

=== Mock chess ===
Position: a8 black rook, b8 black knight, c8 black bishop, d8 black queen, e8 black king, f8 black bishop, g8 black knight, h8 black rook, a7 black pawn, b7 black pawn, c7 black pawn, d7 black pawn, e7 black pawn, f7 black pawn, g7 black pawn, h7 black pawn, a2 white pawn, b2 white pawn, c2 white pawn, d2 white pawn, e2 white pawn, f2 white pawn, g2 white pawn, h2 white pawn, a1 white rook, b1 white knight, c1 white bishop, d1 white queen, e1 white king, f1 white bishop, g1 white knight, h1 white rook

Mock chess startup appears normal.

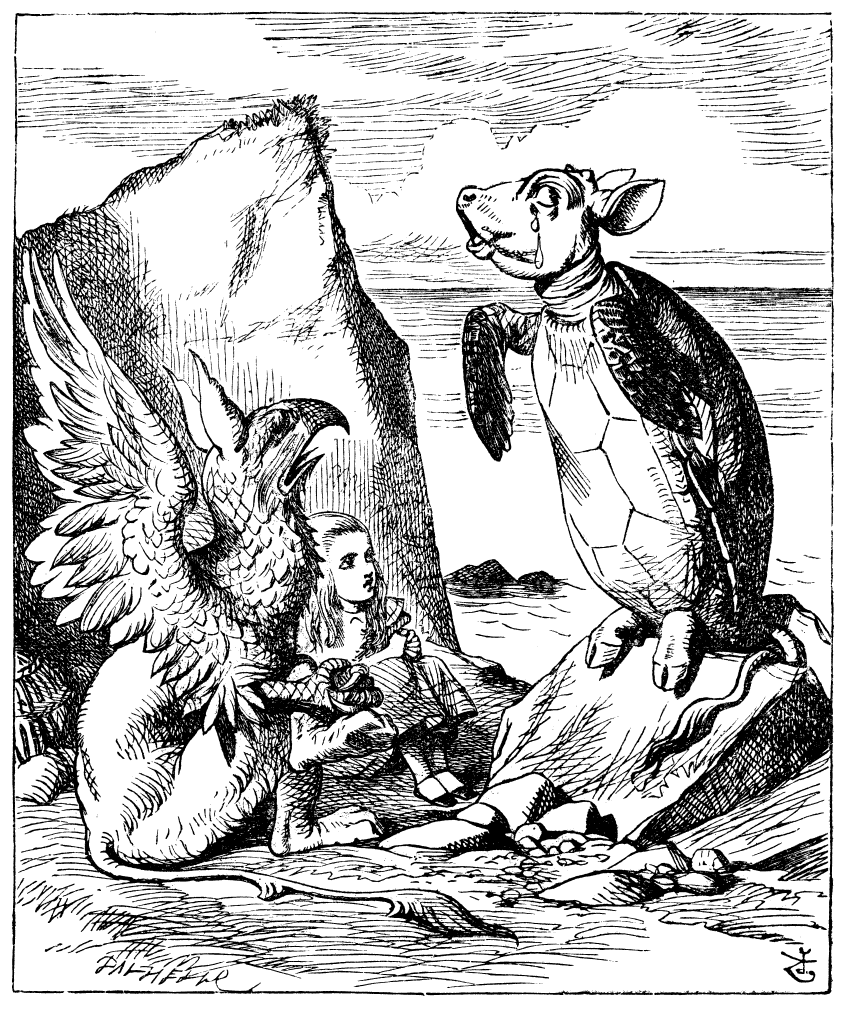
The Mock Turtle's story; (Note: "Sit down, both of you, and don't speak a word till I've finished." So they sat down, and nobody spoke for some minutes. Alice thought to herself, "I don't see how he can ever finish, if he doesn't begin." But she waited patiently. "Once," said the Mock Turtle at last, with a deep sigh, "I was a real Turtle." Alice's Adventures in Wonderland (Chapter 9), "The Mock Turtle's Story") (Note: "'I felt at once in my whiskers, you must be something not real,' said the King. 'To be unreal is silly.' 'I'm a real Mock Turtle,' answered the Mock Turtle, very annoyed at the King's doubt on its reality. 'Royal stuff and nonsense! You'll be telling me and Alice next there are real mock chessmen [...] also they can even play games of real Mock Chess!' (From the Alice unwritten)" Parton (1961), p. 15) illustration by Sir John Tenniel

To win the game, a player must capture all his opponent's pieces, including the king. "A proper pseudomorph to Chess, for it has no elements of check and mate whatever in its basis. Kings are now merely treated like any other chessman." (Parton 1961:15)

==== Game rules ====
If a player can capture, he must do so. If more than one capture are possible on his turn, he may choose which one to make. Only one capture per turn may be made.

On its first move, a pawn must advance two squares—unless the pawn's first move is a capture.

=== Contramatic chess ===
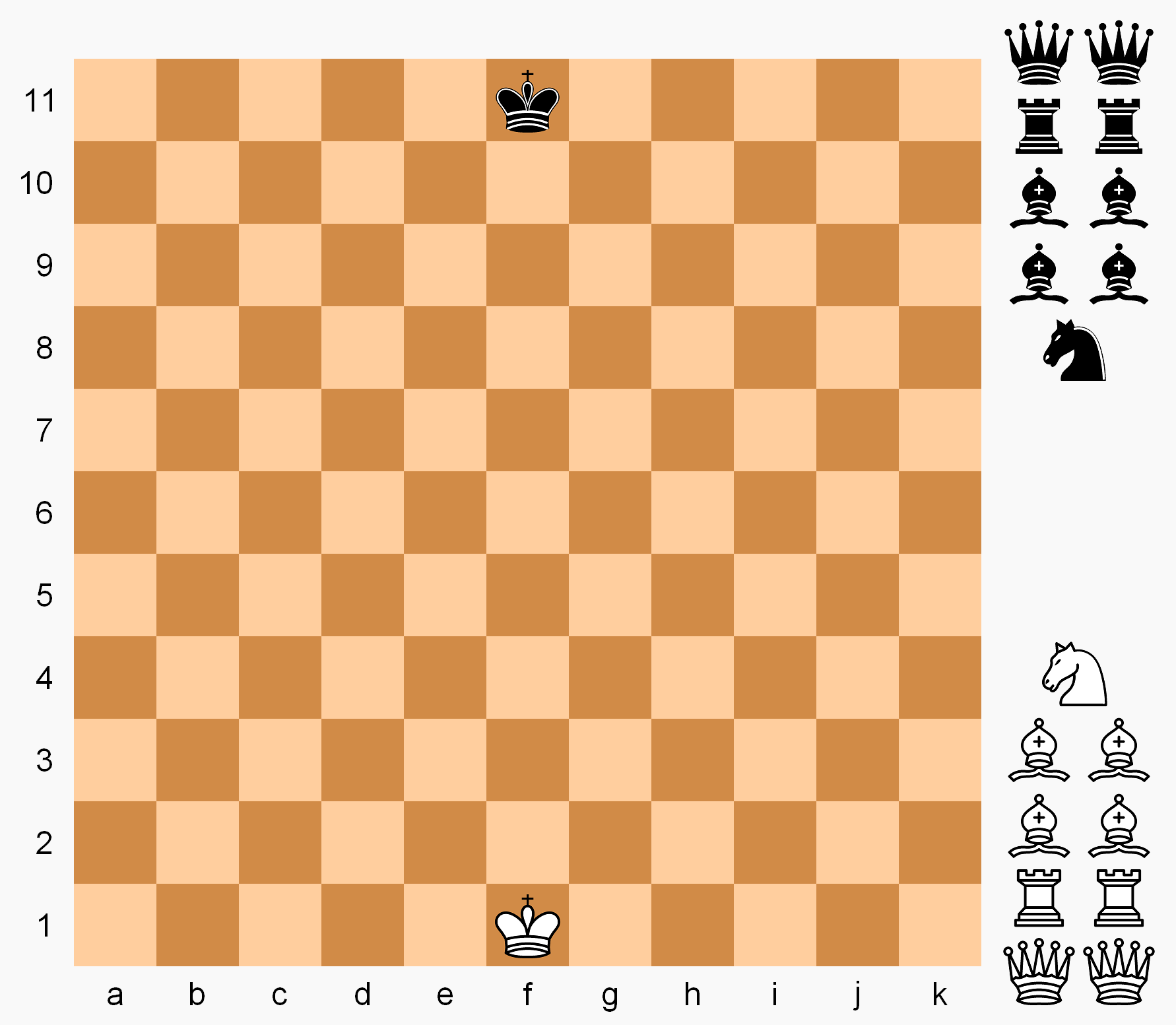
Contramatic chess board (Note: "The board of 9×9 squares is required for Contramatic, but the board of 11×11 squares is probably the ideal." Parton (1961), p. 23) and pawnless starting setup (Note: Parton recommends two or more rooks, but "the actual composition of a player's force is rather a matter of the size of the board and also of whether players wish for short or long games." Parton (1961), p. 23)

The normal rules for check and checkmate are contradicted—a player may not check the enemy king, but may move his own king into check. A player wins when his opponent cannot escape giving check. (Note: "As the character of my 'Blue Caterpillar' idea is truly the logical contrary of orthodox checkmate, my name of 'Contramatic' is obviously the right name to give this Antipodean idea." Parton (1961), p. 22)

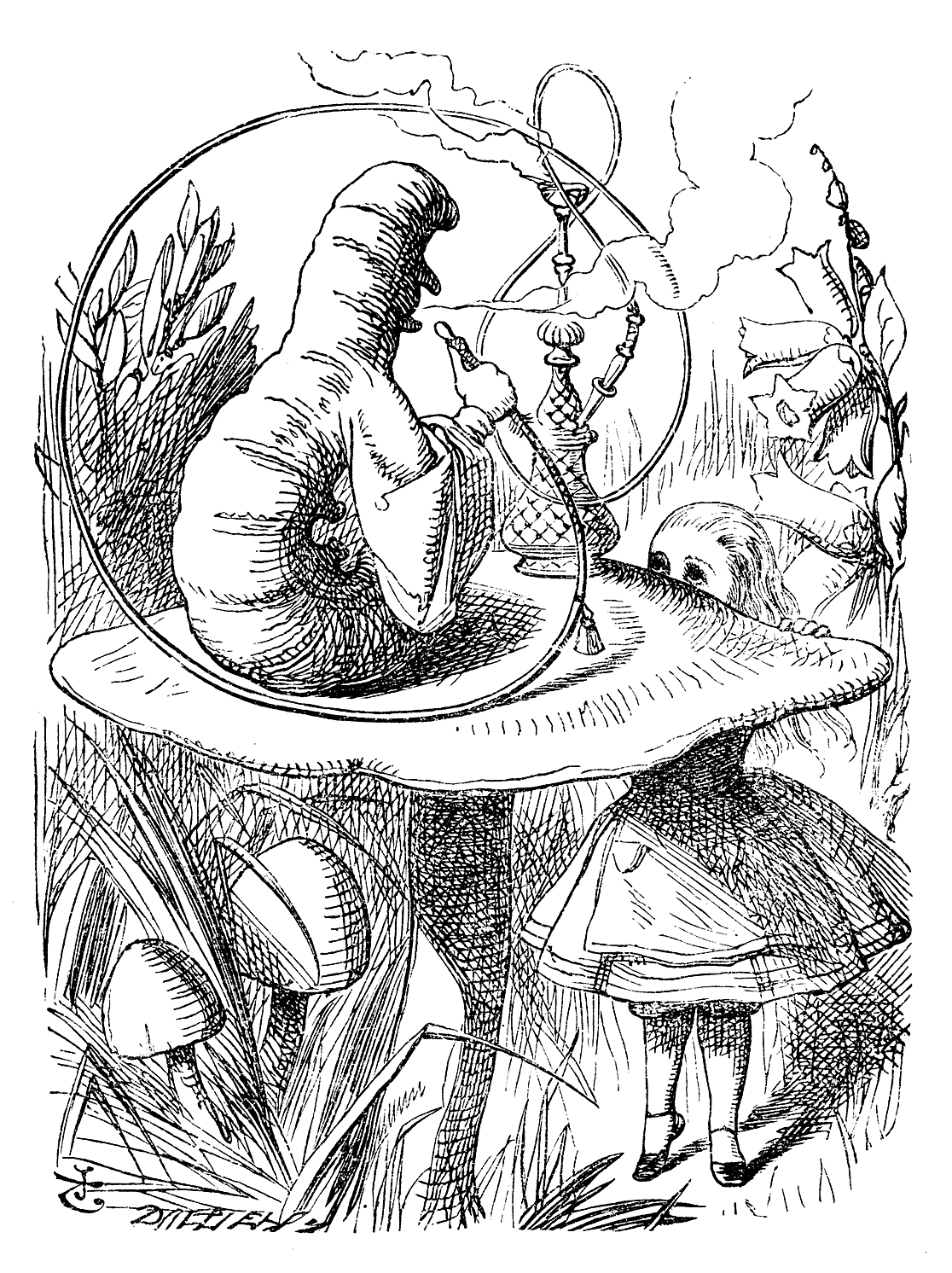
The antipodal Blue Caterpillar; (Note: "I can't explain myself, I'm afraid Sir," said Alice to the Caterpillar (a large blue one that was sitting on top of the large mushroom and smoking a long hookah), "because I'm not myself, you see." "I don't see," said the Caterpillar. "I'm afraid I can't put it more clearly," said Alice very politely, "for I can't understand it myself to begin with, and being so many sizes in a day is very confusing." "It isn't," said the Caterpillar. [...] "Are you content now?" said the Caterpillar. "Well, I should like to be a little larger, Sir, if you wouldn't mind," said Alice: "three inches is such a wretched height to be". "It is a very good height indeed!" said the Caterpillar angrily, rearing itself upright as it spoke. It was exactly three inches high. Parton (1961), p. 22 (paraphrased Alice's Adventures in Wonderland (Chapter 5), "Advice from a Caterpillar")) illustration by Sir John Tenniel

==== Game rules ====
Players start with kings positioned as shown. White places his remaining pieces anywhere he likes on his side of the board, then Black does the same. White moves first.

Checking the opponent is not allowed. (If a player has no move other than to give check, then he loses.) A player may make a move putting his own king in check from enemy piece(s)—unless the move would also give check to the opponent. When a player is in check, his opponent must remove the check on his next turn or lose the game.

==== Observations ====
Kings tend to move more than any other piece. (Note: "The player usually thinks of the King as what is 'hunted or chased.' Whereas formerly the enemy pieces attacked the miserable monarch, here now he is attacking and chasing them instead. Very probably, the most 'chased and hunted' by this special King will be the hostile Queen." Parton (1961), p. 23) Kings cannot occupy adjacent squares, since it would result in giving check to the opponent (in violation of the rules). Captures are rare, since capturing the opponent's men reduces the chance of putting one's own king in check.

==== Variation ====
In Complete Contramatic chess (also known as C.C.C.) each player has two kings – a normal (orthodox) king in addition to the regular "contramatic" king. There are two ways to win: putting one's own contramatic king into inescapable check, or checkmating the enemy orthodox king. Players place the orthodox kings last, after other pieces are placed.

==== Observations ====
A contramatic king can move to a square adjacent to the enemy orthodox king (since the orthodox king may be checked as in normal chess, and the contramatic king may put itself into check). But an orthodox king may not move adjacent to the enemy contramatic king (since it is not allowed to check an opponent's contramatic king, or to put one's own orthodox king into check).

=== Idle Kings' chess ===
Position: a8 black rook, b8 black knight, c8 black bishop, d8 black queen, f8 black bishop, g8 black knight, h8 black rook, a7 black pawn, b7 black pawn, c7 black pawn, d7 black pawn, e7 black pawn, f7 black pawn, g7 black pawn, h7 black pawn, a2 white pawn, b2 white pawn, c2 white pawn, d2 white pawn, e2 white pawn, f2 white pawn, g2 white pawn, h2 white pawn, a1 white rook, b1 white knight, c1 white bishop, d1 white queen, f1 white bishop, g1 white knight, h1 white rook

Idle Kings' chess startup is absent kings.

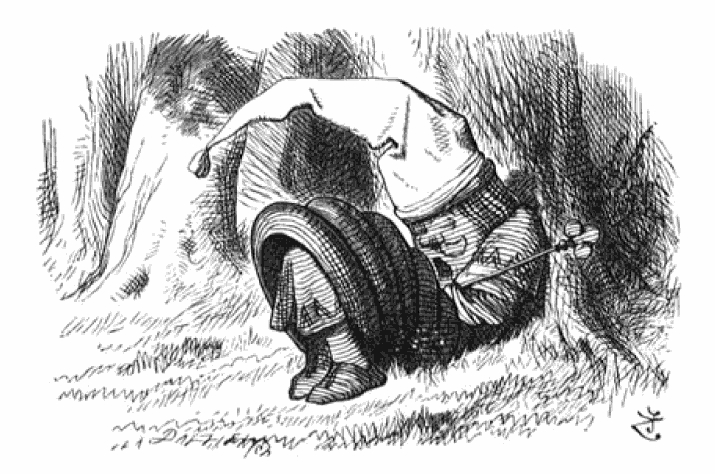
The snoring Red King; (Note: "Here she checked herself in some alarm, at hearing something that sounded to her like the puffing of a large steam-engine in the wood near them, though she feared it was more likely to be a wild beast. 'Are there any lions or tigers about here?' she asked timidly. 'It's only the Red King snoring,' said Tweedledee." Through the Looking-Glass, and What Alice Found There (Chapter 4), "Tweedledum and Tweedledee") illustration by Sir John Tenniel

==== Game rules ====
Players play without kings until after Black's 12th move, when White places his king on any open square (but not in check), and Black does the same.

==== Additional rule ====
After kings are placed the game continues normally, except that kings may not move, unless in check.

=== Unirexal chess ===
Position: a8 black rook, b8 black knight, c8 black bishop, d8 black queen, e8 black queen, f8 black bishop, g8 black knight, h8 black rook, a7 black pawn, b7 black pawn, c7 black pawn, d7 black pawn, e7 black pawn, f7 black pawn, g7 black pawn, h7 black pawn, a2 white pawn, b2 white pawn, c2 white pawn, d2 white pawn, e2 white pawn, f2 white pawn, g2 white pawn, h2 white pawn, a1 white rook, b1 white knight, c1 white bishop, d1 white queen, e1 white king, f1 white bishop, g1 white knight, h1 white rook

Unirexal chess starts with Black's king replaced by a second black queen.

Also known as The Black King's Complaint, Unirexal variants are those with only one king on the board. "The black king disappeared, explains Parton, because he was fed up with always being mated in problems." (Pritchard 1994:332) (Note: "Alice heard someone weeping behind the chessbox, and there she found the Black King shedding bitter tears into a bucket. 'What is the trouble, Your Majesty?' asked Alice with sympathy. 'They are most unkind. Why am I always the one chosen to be checkmated in problems? They are not fair to my royal dignity. It is really time that old White King took his turn. [...] I know now what I must do. I will disappear; then they will really have to find something else to checkmate.' Alice saw the Black King thereupon change himself completely into hot tears and splash into the bucket, where he boiled rapidly away from sight! (From the Alice unwritten)" Parton (1961), p. 11)

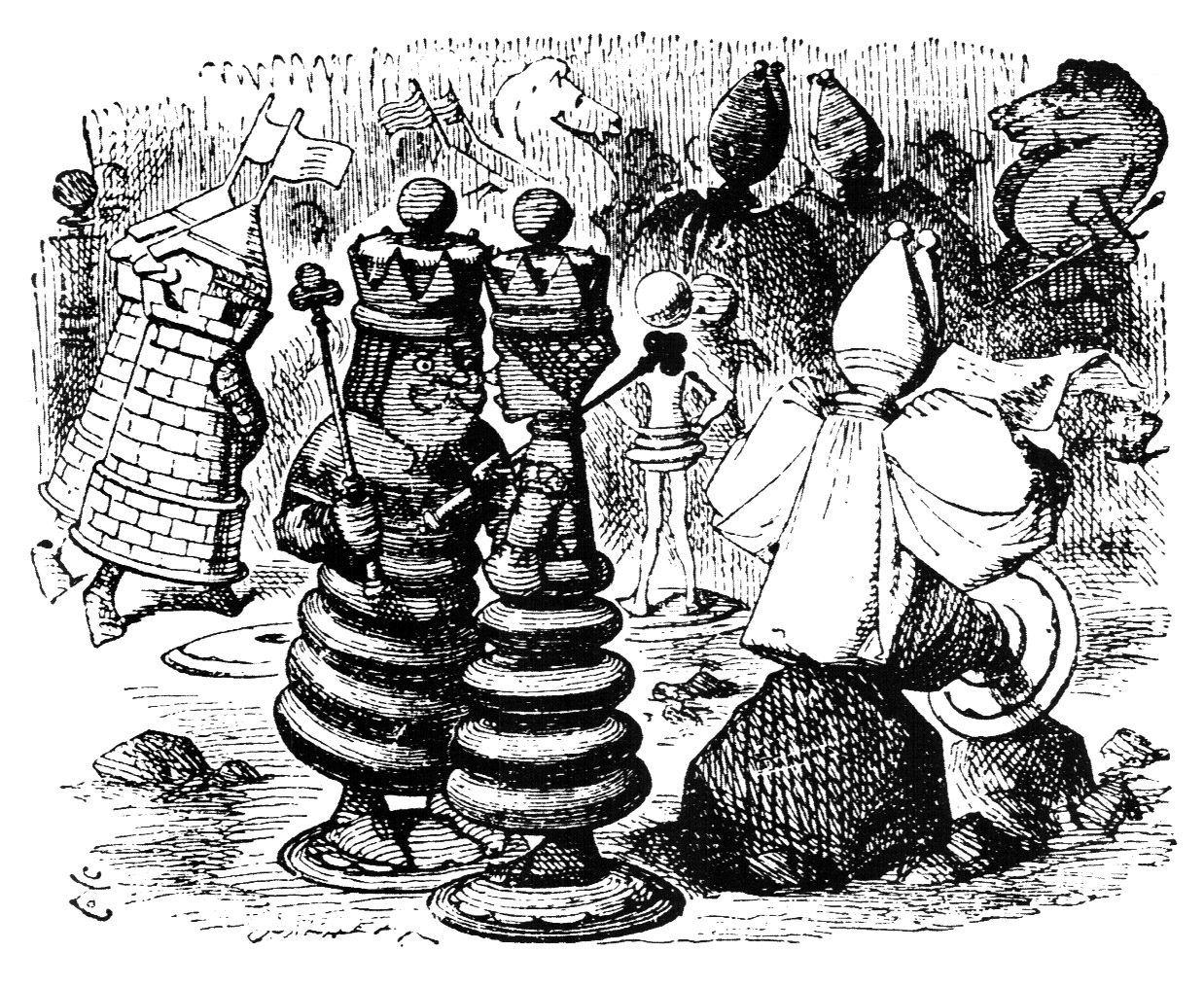
The chessmen through the looking glass; illustration by Sir John Tenniel

==== Game rules ====
Black has a second queen (Note: A rook, bishop, knight, or even pawn may replace the black king instead, if the players prefer (Parton 1961:11).) instead of a king, and must checkmate White in a reasonable number of moves (agreed to before the game), otherwise White wins.

==== Variation ====
Position: a8 black knight, b8 black knight, c8 black knight, d8 black knight, e8 black knight, f8 black knight, g8 black knight, h8 black knight, a7 black knight, b7 black knight, c7 black knight, d7 black knight, e7 black knight, f7 black knight, g7 black knight, h7 black knight, a6 black knight, b6 black knight, g6 black knight, h6 black knight, a2 white pawn, b2 white pawn, c2 white pawn, d2 white pawn, e2 white pawn, f2 white pawn, g2 white pawn, h2 white pawn, a1 white rook, b1 white knight, c1 white bishop, d1 white queen, e1 white king, f1 white bishop, g1 white knight, h1 white rook

Unirexal variation

Black has 20 knights, but no king. If Black does not checkmate White within 50 moves, he loses.

=== Decimal Rettah chess ===
	a	b	c	d	e	f	g	h	i	j
10	a10 black rook	b10 black knight	c10 black bishop	d10 black queen	e10 black king	f10 black king	g10 black queen	h10 black bishop	i10 black knight	j10 black rook	10
9	a9 black pawn	b9 black pawn	c9 black pawn	d9 black pawn	e9 black pawn	f9 black pawn	g9 black pawn	h9 black pawn	i9 black pawn	j9 black pawn	9
8	a8	b8	c8	d8	e8	f8	g8	h8	i8	j8	8
7	a7	b7	c7	d7	e7	f7	g7	h7	i7	j7	7
6	a6	b6	c6	d6	e6	f6	g6	h6	i6	j6	6
5	a5	b5	c5	d5	e5	f5	g5	h5	i5	j5	5
4	a4	b4	c4	d4	e4	f4	g4	h4	i4	j4	4
3	a3	b3	c3	d3	e3	f3	g3	h3	i3	j3	3
2	a2 white pawn	b2 white pawn	c2 white pawn	d2 white pawn	e2 white pawn	f2 white pawn	g2 white pawn	h2 white pawn	i2 white pawn	j2 white pawn	2
1	a1 white rook	b1 white knight	c1 white bishop	d1 white queen	e1 white king	f1 white king	g1 white queen	h1 white bishop	i1 white knight	j1 white rook	1
	a	b	c	d	e	f	g	h	i	j

Decimal Rettah chess board and startup (Note: Parton expressed no preference for a particular back rank setup. Another is RNKBQQBKNR given in Feenschach.)

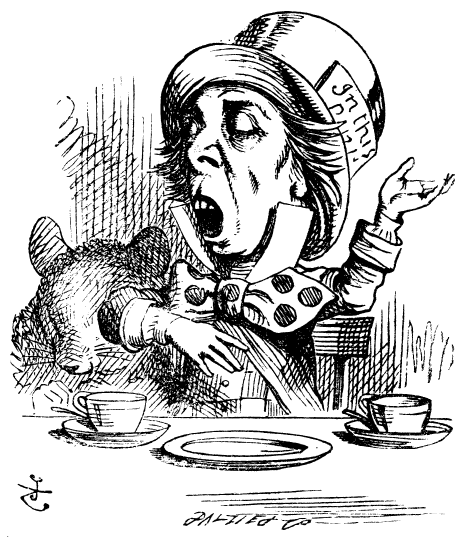
The Mad Hatter; (Note: "Alice found the Hatter gazing into the Looking-glass; he was admiring the reflection of the hat on his head. 'That's a beautiful hat,' he said to Alice, 'it is worth any crown, gold or tin.' He then added very proudly, as he raised himself on tiptoe, 'It makes me every inch a King!' (From the Alice unwritten)" Parton (1961), p. 7) illustration by Sir John Tenniel

This is Parton's first chess variant invention. The idea sprang from a dislike for weak kings: "The king ought to be strong, not feeble, by aesthetic standards: he is the centre around which turns the whole game itself. In consequence, my Rettah monarch is the most powerful of all pieces." (Parton 1961:7)

Each player has two rettahs (kings) and two queens on a 10×10 board. There is no checkmate; a player wins by capturing both opponent's rettahs.

==== Game rules ====
A rettah [hatter spelled backwards] moves and captures as a Q+N compound. If a rettah is attacked, the attacking piece must be captured immediately. (If more than one piece is able to capture, the player may choose. An attacked rettah will always have the option to capture.) If a rettah is attacked by two pieces simultaneously, the attacked rettah must capture one of them (the player may choose which).

Pawns can move up to three steps on their first move. There is no en passant. If players agree, pawns can also move one step diagonally forward (to facilitate opening lines). A pawn promotes to rettah, but only if a rettah of the same colour was previously captured. There is no castling in Decimal Rettah.

==== Variations ====
Parton gives several variations, although Decimal Rettah is "possibly the earlier version and arguably the better" (Pritchard 1994:82). In Absolute Rettah chess, only a rettah may capture a rettah. (So a successful tactic involves attacking a rettah with a piece guarded by one's own rettah.) In Giveaway Rettah, Decimal or Absolute Rettah are played according to Suicide chess rules. In Rettah chess (one rettah; pawns move only one step forward) and Double Rettah chess (two rettahs; no forced capture; win by checkmating a rettah), play is on a regular 8×8 board.

==== Sample game ====
Decimal Rettah, "a game of assault and sacrifice", received high praise from Boyer who published the following sample game [the game uses an alternate initial setup NBKQRRQKBN and incorrect interpretation of the capture rule, requiring that only a rettah may capture its attacker]:

1.c3 f6 2.Qb3 Rf8 3.Qxb9+ Kxb9 4.Bf5+ Kxf5 5.e4+ Kxe4 6.f3+ Kxf3 7.Rxf3 Qc6 8.Rh3 Qxc3+ 9.Kxc3 Rc8+ 10.Kxc8 dxc8 11.Qc5 e7 12.Rxh9+ Kxh9 13.Qh5+ Kxh5 14.Ni3+ Kxi3 15.Kxi3 1–0

=== Identific ===
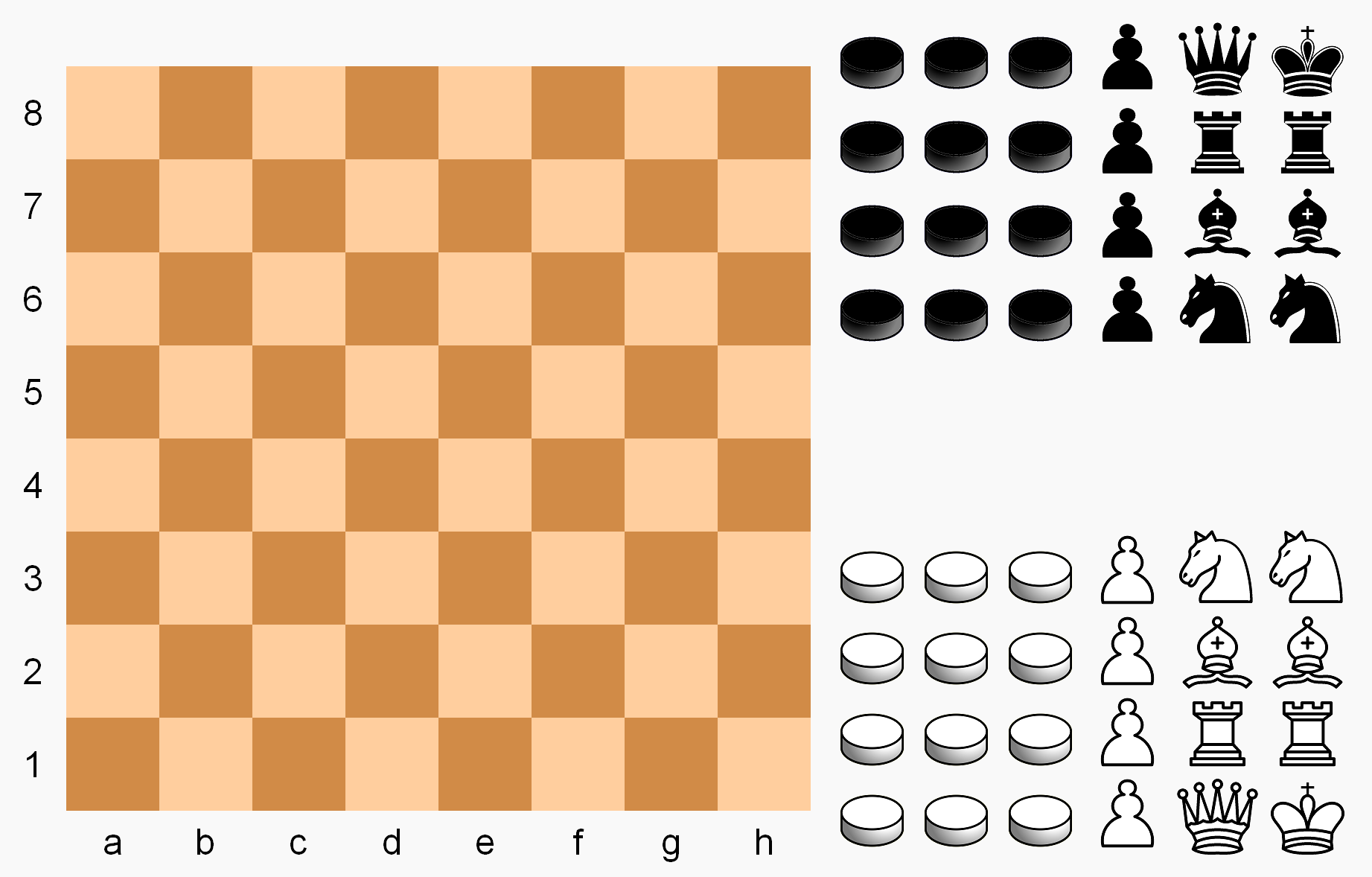
Identific starts on an empty board. Players start with 12 counters "in hand", as well as the regular chess army minus four pawns.

In this variant, the identity of chess pieces becomes known as play proceeds.

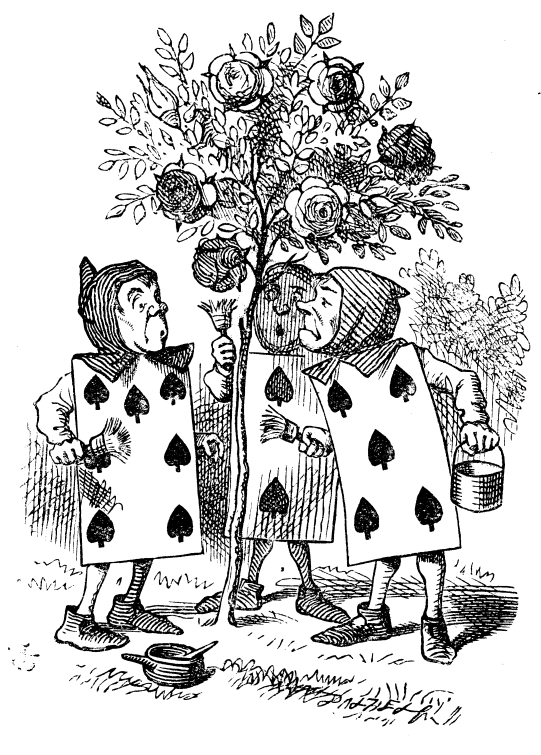
The Queen's gardeners; (Note: "When groups of cards saw the Queen of Hearts approaching, they went down flat on their faces to show loyalty and respect to her Majesty as she passed by. 'What, which and who?' asked the White King. 'Some of these, those and the others are my own subjects' replied the Queen, 'and some of them aren't mine. I borrow subjects off the other queens to make mine look a multitude instead of a mere handful.' 'All of them look exactly the same to my eyes' said the White King with a puzzled expression on his face. 'Problems of identification must be impossible to solve as their backs are all alike. This is like that, and so is that this or that, I'd like to know.' 'It's very easy and simple,' said the Queen, 'for you just turn them over with your left toe, not the right toe of course, because that is to stand on.'" Parton (1970) Part I, p. 7) illustration by Sir John Tenniel

==== Game rules ====
Players first place their 12 counters (draughtsmen) on any squares of their choosing on their own half of the board. (Either White places all his counters first, followed by Black; or one per turn if the players prefer.)

After all counters have been placed, White moves any one of his counters as a regular chess piece of his choosing, then immediately replaces that counter with the corresponding chess piece. Black does similarly on his turn. These "moves of identification" obey the following rules:

- A pawn is identified by the move of a counter one step forward.
- A bishop or queen is identified by a diagonal move two or more squares.
- A rook or queen is identified by an orthogonal move two or more squares.
- Counters cannot capture or give check.

After each player has identified one chess piece, on subsequent turns players may choose to identify an additional piece from those still in-hand, or move one of their chess pieces already on the board. Chess pieces move, capture, give check/checkmate as normal, and may capture enemy counters.

A player's fourth identified piece must be his king. (Or the players can agree on a different schedule, for example, the sixth identified piece.) Players might also want to prevent the early identification of queens, for example, by requiring at least five identifications, or by limiting identification of queen to a player's last-remaining counter.

=== Synchronistic chess ===
Position: a8 black rook, b8 black knight, c8 black bishop, d8 black queen, e8 black king, f8 black bishop, g8 black knight, h8 black rook, a7 black pawn, b7 black pawn, c7 black pawn, d7 black pawn, e7 black pawn, f7 black pawn, g7 black pawn, h7 black pawn, a2 white pawn, b2 white pawn, c2 white pawn, d2 white pawn, e2 white pawn, f2 white pawn, g2 white pawn, h2 white pawn, a1 white rook, b1 white knight, c1 white bishop, d1 white queen, e1 white king, f1 white bishop, g1 white knight, h1 white rook

Synchronistic chess startup appears normal.

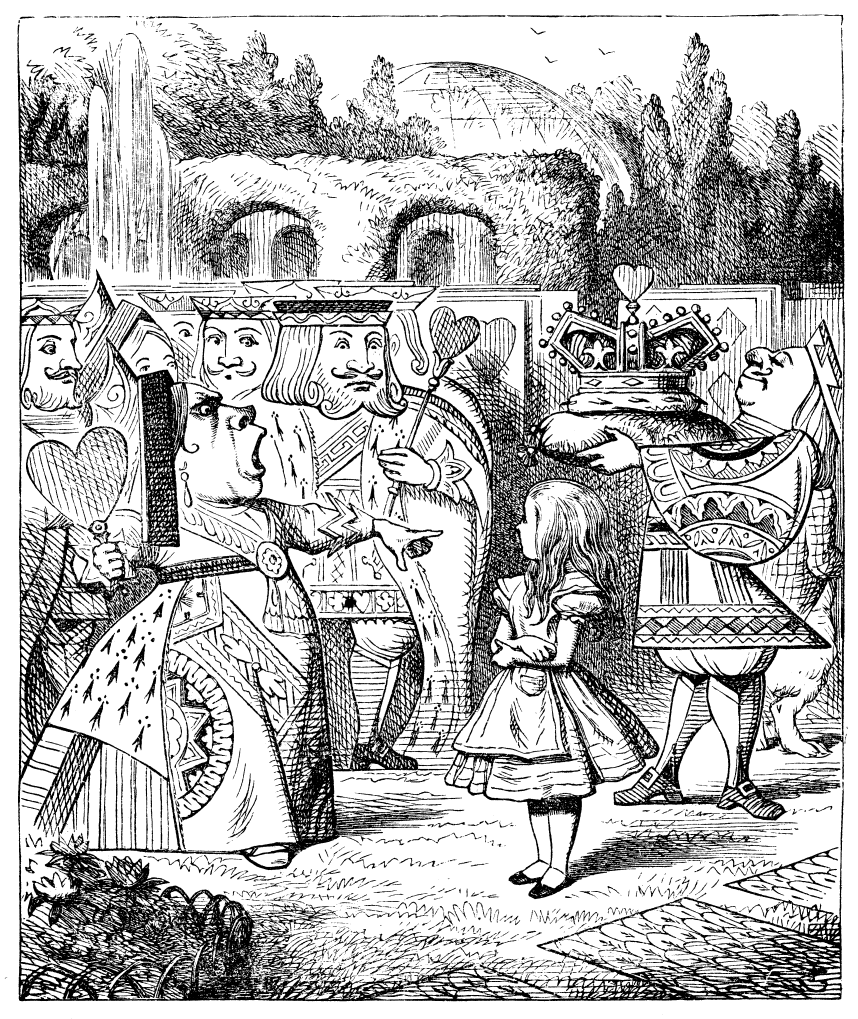
The King and Queen of Hearts (grand procession); (Note: "Last of all through the castle gates came the White King and the Queen of Hearts who were, Alice saw, engaged in a very bitter and irrational wrangle over the question of which was superior Whist or Chess? The White King put forward seriously the claim that the golden idea of Chess is far worthier of respect and attention than is the tinsel-natured idea of the card game Whist. Is not the game of Chess an honourable rational conflict, a combat purely and entirely of intelligence and psychological acrobatics between the two opponents? Quite unlike in Whist, there is no 'luck' bestowed by the Lady Caissa on one player over the other in Chess. The White King furthermore claimed that Chess is a game where real justice is in full control. Have not the two opponents forces of equal strength and identical pattern at the start of play? [...] Hereupon the Queen of Hearts retorted 'Stupid old monarch, you claim initial equality between the two players, but what about the advantage or otherwise to the player who makes the very first move in the battle. You can't be equal when you are not starting together!'" Parton (1970) Part I, p. 9) illustration by Sir John Tenniel

"A variant designed, part tongue-in-cheek, to achieve absolute equality." (Pritchard 1994:297) "[...] to eliminate altogether that inequality between White and Black, by the simple idea that White and Black shall always play their corresponding moves simultaneously!" (Parton 1970a, Part I:9)

==== Game rules ====
For each turn players decide their moves, write them down secretly, then disclose them. They adjust the position accordingly, using the following rules of resolution when needed:

- If moves were to the same square, then White captures Black if the square is on Black's half of the board; Black captures White if the square is on White's half.
- If moves were reciprocal captures, then both pieces are removed from the board.
- If one player moved to a square the opponent's piece occupied, but that piece moved away in the turn, it is considered captured and removed from the board if it is of lower rank (K > Q > R > B > N > P). If it is the same or higher rank, then both moves stand.

In Synchronistic Chess, simultaneous checkmate is possible. (Note: "Most non-taking moves, and takes where the pieces captured did not move, will scarcely raise a difficulty. Whatever the fantastications created, my idea Synchronistic is the most just and rational form of Chess! Indeed, in the Synchronistic game, it is possible for the white and black Kings to be checkmated simultaneously! What can be more equal?" Parton (1970) Part I, p. 10)

=== Damate ===
	a	b	c	d	e	f	g	h	i	j
10	a10 black rook	b10 black bishop	c10 black knight	d10 black queen	e10 black king	f10 black king	g10 black queen	h10 black knight	i10 black bishop	j10 black rook	10
9	a9 black pawn	b9 black pawn	c9 black pawn	d9 black pawn	e9 black pawn	f9 black pawn	g9 black pawn	h9 black pawn	i9 black pawn	j9 black pawn	9
8	a8	b8	c8	d8	e8	f8	g8	h8	i8	j8	8
7	a7	b7	c7	d7	e7	f7	g7	h7	i7	j7	7
6	a6	b6	c6	d6	e6	f6	g6	h6	i6	j6	6
5	a5	b5	c5	d5	e5	f5	g5	h5	i5	j5	5
4	a4	b4	c4	d4	e4	f4	g4	h4	i4	j4	4
3	a3	b3	c3	d3	e3	f3	g3	h3	i3	j3	3
2	a2 white pawn	b2 white pawn	c2 white pawn	d2 white pawn	e2 white pawn	f2 white pawn	g2 white pawn	h2 white pawn	i2 white pawn	j2 white pawn	2
1	a1 white rook	b1 white bishop	c1 white knight	d1 white queen	e1 white king	f1 white king	g1 white queen	h1 white knight	i1 white bishop	j1 white rook	1
	a	b	c	d	e	f	g	h	i	j

Damate board and starting setup (Note: If knight rules are cumbersome for the players, Parton gives an alternative knightless 1st rank setup of PBRQKKQRBP. Or, knights can be treated as stationary but capturable.)

Also known as Damate Game, the game is a synthesis between draughts and chess. (Note: The general idea of Damification is more or less the introduction and application to the game of chess of the principal elements characteristic of its sister game, that of draughts. Such an idea may appear as most shocking to some players of either game; let heresies at least be orthodox and not unorthodox in themselves! (Parton 1961:16).) (Note: The baby grunted again, and Alice looked very anxiously into its face. There could be no doubt that it had a very turn-up nose, much more like a snout than a real nose; also its eyes were getting extremely small for a baby. "If you're going to turn into a pig," said Alice, "I'll have nothing more to do with you. Mind now!" ... When it grunted again, so violently, she looked down into its face in some alarm. This time there could be no mistake about it; it was neither more or less than a pig! Parton (1961), p. 15 (paraphrased Alice's Adventures in Wonderland (Chapter 6), "Pig and Pepper"))

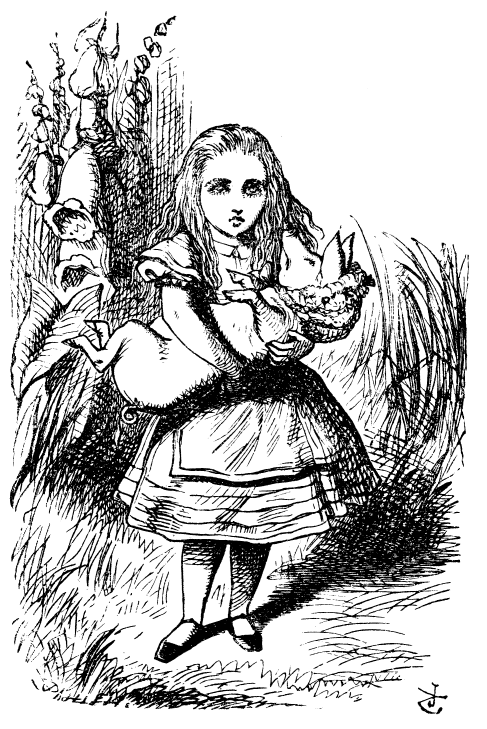
Illustration by Sir John Tenniel

==== Game rules ====
A king has no royal powers and is considered a normal man; a player wins by eliminating all the opponent's men. The pieces move normally, except that pawns have no initial two-step option, and besides their normal one-step move straight forward, can move one step diagonally forward. A piece captures an enemy piece by jumping it:

- A king captures by jumping an adjacent man in any direction, landing on the vacant square immediately beyond.
- The rook, bishop, and queen capture by jumping a man in their path, landing on any of the vacant squares immediately beyond. Only the piece captured may be jumped.
- The pawn captures by jumping an adjacent man either diagonally forward or straight forward, landing on the vacant square immediately beyond.
- The knight captures by jumping a man it would normally replace in chess, landing on the vacant square one additional knight-move away in a straight line (similar to the move of a nightrider; for example, a knight on c1 captures a man on d3, by jumping to the vacant square e5).

As in draughts, jumping is always mandatory, multi-jumps are possible, and the multi-jump chosen must capture the maximum number of pieces possible. (If more than one jumping sequence captures the maximum, the player may choose.) The pieces captured in a multi-jump are not removed from the board until the end of the turn.

A pawn promotes to queen when it crosses the centre line of the board. A pawn jumping over the centre line both promotes and immediately ends the turn (i.e. no further jumps are allowed).

=== Dunce's chess ===
Position: a8 black rook, b8 black knight, c8 black bishop, d8 black queen, e8 black king, f8 black bishop, g8 black knight, h8 black rook, a7 black pawn, b7 black pawn, c7 black pawn, d7 black pawn, e7 black pawn, f7 black pawn, g7 black pawn, h7 black pawn, a2 white pawn, b2 white pawn, c2 white pawn, d2 white pawn, e2 white pawn, f2 white pawn, g2 white pawn, h2 white pawn, a1 white rook, b1 white knight, c1 white bishop, d1 white queen, e1 white king, f1 white bishop, g1 white knight, h1 white rook

Dunce's chess startup appears normal.

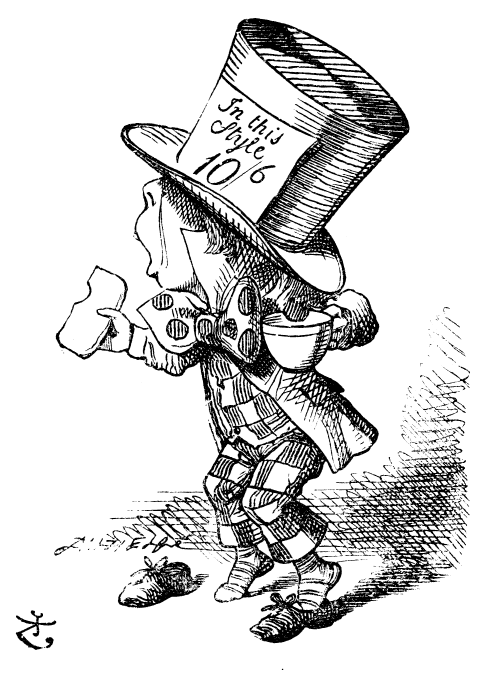
The Mad Hatter; (Note: [...] the wretched Hatter trembled so, that he shook both his shoes off. "Give your evidence," the King of Hearts repeated angrily, "or I'll have you executed, whether you're nervous or not." "I'm a poor man, your Majesty," the Hatter began in a trembling voice, "and I hadn't begun my tea ... not above a week or so ... and what with the bread-and-butter getting so thin ... and the twinkling of the tea ..." "The twinkling of the what?" said the King. "It began with the tea," the Hatter replied. "Of course, twinkling begins with a T," said the King sharply. "Do you take me for a dunce?" Alice's Adventures in Wonderland (Chapter 11), "Who Stole the Tarts?") illustration by Sir John Tenniel

Also known as Advancing chess, (Note: This grade [variation] of Dunce's Chess is my original idea of this game, to which I gave the name of "Advancing Chess" (Parton 1961:3).) the game has simple rules: Moves, captures, and checks are restricted to straight forward or diagonally forward directions. (Sideways or backwards is not permitted.) Pawns do not promote. The game is won by checkmating or stalemating the opponent.

==== Variations ====
- The same rules, but the initial position is without queens and rooks.
- The same rules, but the initial position is without queens, rooks, and pawns.

=== Semi-queen chess ===
	a	b	c	d	e	f	g	h	i	j
10	a10 black rook	b10 black knight	c10 black bishop	d10 B d	e10 black queen	f10 black king	g10 black upside-down rook	h10 black bishop	i10 black knight	j10 black rook	10
9	a9 black pawn	b9 black pawn	c9 black pawn	d9 black pawn	e9 black pawn	f9 black pawn	g9 black pawn	h9 black pawn	i9 black pawn	j9 black pawn	9
8	a8	b8	c8	d8	e8	f8	g8	h8	i8	j8	8
7	a7	b7	c7	d7	e7	f7	g7	h7	i7	j7	7
6	a6	b6	c6	d6	e6	f6	g6	h6	i6	j6	6
5	a5	b5	c5	d5	e5	f5	g5	h5	i5	j5	5
4	a4	b4	c4	d4	e4	f4	g4	h4	i4	j4	4
3	a3	b3	c3	d3	e3	f3	g3	h3	i3	j3	3
2	a2 white pawn	b2 white pawn	c2 white pawn	d2 white pawn	e2 white pawn	f2 white pawn	g2 white pawn	h2 white pawn	i2 white pawn	j2 white pawn	2
1	a1 white rook	b1 white knight	c1 white bishop	d1 B l	e1 white queen	f1 white king	g1 white upside-down rook	h1 white bishop	i1 white knight	j1 white rook	1
	a	b	c	d	e	f	g	h	i	j

Semi-queen chess board and starting setup. Bioks are represented by inverted rooks. Roshops are represented by inverted bishops.

Also known as half-queen's chess, the game introduces two additional pawns and two new pieces per side, the "ugly-named Biok and Roshop".

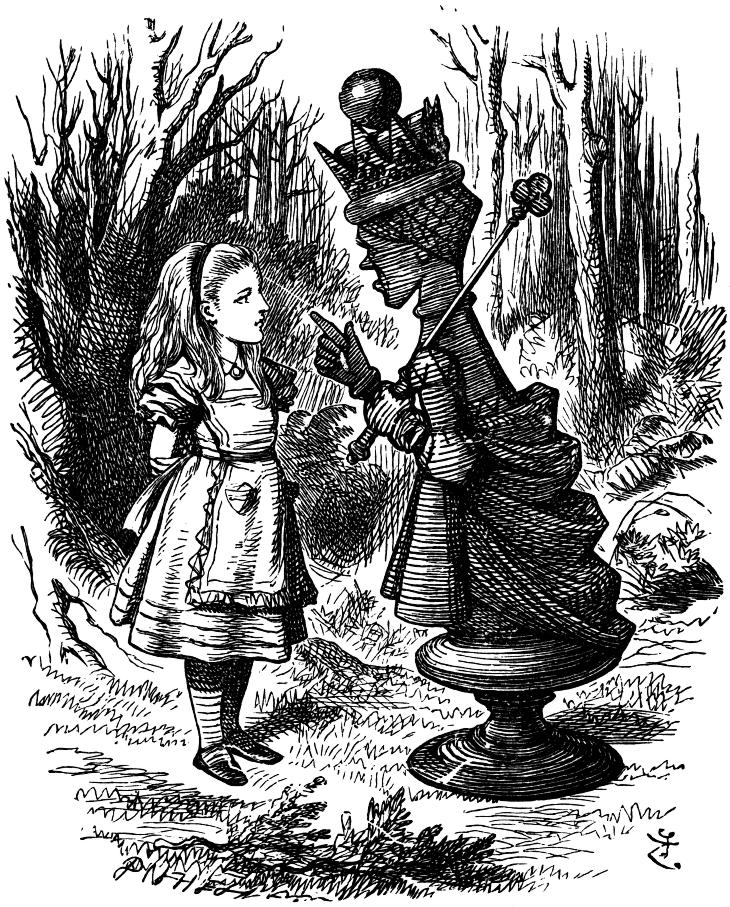
Alice meets the Red Queen; (Note: "The Red Queen was talking to Alice about crowns, teacups and dust, when a strange-looking chessman passed haughtily by. At first glance, Alice thought he must be a Rook which had been badly shaped by some lazy wood-carver. 'Please, Your Red Majesty, that Rook seems out of shape.' 'That is not a Rook; she is the Biok,' said the Red Queen with much annoyance. 'She is very conceited, for she now regards herself as my sister, but she is really—' the Queen whispered to Alice, 'only my half-sister. She behaves awkwardly like the other half-sister.' (From the Alice unwritten)" Parton (1961), "The Queen's Relations", p. 7) illustration by Sir John Tenniel

==== Game rules ====
The Biok makes non-capturing moves like a bishop, and captures like a rook. The Roshop makes non-capturing moves like a rook, and captures like a bishop. (Note: The "half-sisters", as these may be considered of the Queen, are consequently the "Biok" who moves like the Bishop but captures like the Rook, and the "Roshop" who behaves reversely. Together, these two half-queens compound into the queen proper.(Parton 1961:5).)

As a result, the Roshop "has the great advantage of being able to change from one colour system of squares to the other when required" (Parton 1974:5).

==== Variation ====
	a	b	c	d	e	f	g	h	i	j
10	a10 black rook	b10 black upside-down rook	c10 B d	d10 black bishop	e10 black queen	f10 black king	g10 black bishop	h10 B d	i10 black upside-down rook	j10 black rook	10
9	a9 black pawn	b9 black pawn	c9 black pawn	d9 black pawn	e9 black knight	f9 black knight	g9 black pawn	h9 black pawn	i9 black pawn	j9 black pawn	9
8	a8	b8	c8	d8	e8	f8	g8	h8	i8	j8	8
7	a7	b7	c7	d7	e7	f7	g7	h7	i7	j7	7
6	a6	b6	c6	d6	e6	f6	g6	h6	i6	j6	6
5	a5	b5	c5	d5	e5	f5	g5	h5	i5	j5	5
4	a4	b4	c4	d4	e4	f4	g4	h4	i4	j4	4
3	a3	b3	c3	d3	e3	f3	g3	h3	i3	j3	3
2	a2 white pawn	b2 white pawn	c2 white pawn	d2 white pawn	e2 white knight	f2 white knight	g2 white pawn	h2 white pawn	i2 white pawn	j2 white pawn	2
1	a1 white rook	b1 white upside-down rook	c1 B l	d1 white bishop	e1 white queen	f1 white king	g1 white bishop	h1 B l	i1 white upside-down rook	j1 white rook	1
	a	b	c	d	e	f	g	h	i	j

Semi-queen chess extension

Parton defines an extension having no additional pawns and a pair of Bioks and Roshops per player.

=== Black and White chess ===
Position: a8 black rook, b8 black knight, c8 black bishop, d8 black queen, e8 black king, f8 black bishop, g8 black knight, h8 black rook, a7 black pawn, b7 black pawn, c7 black pawn, d7 black pawn, e7 black pawn, f7 black pawn, g7 black pawn, h7 black pawn, a2 white pawn, b2 white pawn, c2 white pawn, d2 white pawn, e2 white pawn, f2 white pawn, g2 white pawn, h2 white pawn, a1 white rook, b1 white knight, c1 white bishop, d1 white queen, e1 white king, f1 white bishop, g1 white knight, h1 white rook

Black and White chess startup appears normal.

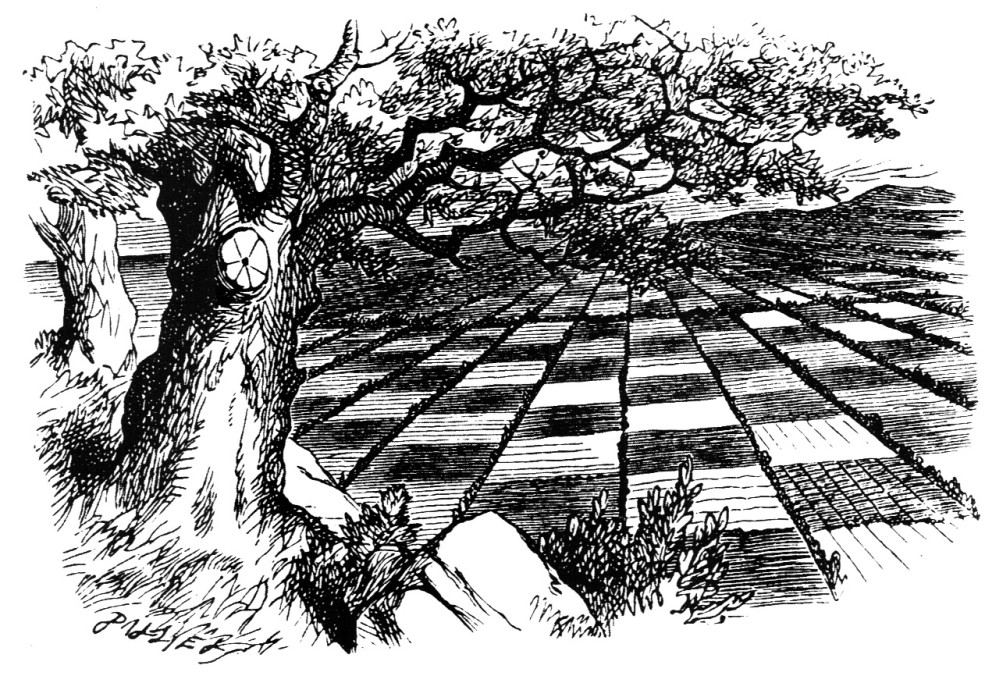
Curious country; (Note: "'I declare it's marked out just like a large chess-board!' Alice said at last." Through the Looking-Glass, and What Alice Found There (Chapter 2), "The Garden of Live Flowers") illustration by Sir John Tenniel

Also known as Black and White Marseillais chess, this game follows a simple rule: each player makes two moves per turn, first with a man standing on a white (light) square, then with a man standing on a black (dark) square. Some resolutions are provided:

- If either move is impossible, that move is lost.
- If the first move delivers a check, the second move is lost.
- If a player is in check, their first move must get out of check. If doing so requires moving from a black square, it "counts as a second move and the first move is lost".

Castling can be done on either the first or second move of a turn. A man can be moved twice in a turn if square colour requirements are met. (For example, with a white pawn on a2 and a black bishop on b4, White's turn can consist of a3 followed by axb4.)

== List of game inventions ==
=== Chess variants ===
- Checkers chess (1950s)
- Decimal four-handed chess (1950s)
- Idle Kings' chess (1950s)
- Nightrider chess (1950s)
- Scaci Partonici (1950s)
- Decimal Rettah chess (1952)
- Double Rettah chess (1952)
- Parton's Game (1952)
- Rettah chess (1952)
- Tweedle chess (or Twin Orthodox chess) (1952)
- Alice chess (1953)
- Kinglet chess (or imperial fiddlesticks) (1953)
- Neutral King chess (1953)
- No-retreat chess (1954), co-inventor J. Boyer
- Black and White chess (or Black and White Marseillais chess) (1955) (Note: Credited to Parton and published in the March 1955 issue of British Chess Magazine (Pritchard 2007:23).)
- Ecila (1957 or earlier)
- Degraded chess (1958)
- Complete contramatic chess (1961)
- Contramatic chess (1961)
- Damate (1961)
- Racing Kings (1961)
- Dunce's chess (or advancing chess) (1961)
- Gryphon chess (or complicacious chess) (1961)
- Jabberwocky chess (1961)
- Knightmare chess (1961)
- Linear chess (1961)
- March Hare chess (1961)
- Royal Scaci Partonici (1961)
- Scacia (1961)
- Simpleton chess (or Simpletonry) (1961)
- Twin chess (1961)
- Unirexal chess (or The Black King's Complaint) (1961)
- Chimaera chess (1969)
- Mock chess (1969)
- Ambi-chess (1970)
- Best decimal butter (1970)
- Blot-straight chess (1970)
- Butters (1970)
- Capricorn chess (1970)
- Centaur Royal (1970)
- Cheshire Cat chess (1970)
- Co-regal chess (1970)
- Cubic chess (1970)
- Demigorgon chess (1970)
- Dodo chess (1970)
- Gorgona chess (1970)
- Identific (1970)
- Looking-glass chess (1970)
- Mad Threeparty chess (1970)
- Meddlers' chess (1970)
- Semi-queen chess (or half-queen's chess) (1970)
- Sphinx chess (1970)
- Timur's cubic chess (1970)
- Wyvern chess (1970)
- Circean (1971)
- Dabbabante chess (1971)
- Decimal Oriental chess (1971)
- Imitante Queen chess (1971)
- Synchronistic chess (1971)
- 2000 A.D. (1972)
- Royal Fury (1972)
- Gorgon chess (1973)
- Megasaur chess (1973)
- Mimotaur chess (1973)
- Rangers chess (1973)
- Triscacia (1974)

=== Draughts variants ===
- Alician Draughts (1956) (Note: International draughts played by rules similar to Alice chess. The player with no pieces remaining on the original board, loses.)
- Damate (1961)
- Dragon
- Kinger, Simple Kinger, and Grand Kinger
- Scoundrels

=== Other games ===
- Salterello (Note: Described by Parton as "Halma-like".)

== Monographs (with section headings) ==
Curiouser and Curiouser (1961), (Note: "Dedicated to Blind Players of Chess • The author sincerely thanks Professor J. Boyer (Paris), Miss G. M. King, and his brother, Mr. C. T. Parton, for their very kind help concerning this little book on 'Alician Themes' in chess and related ideas." (Parton 1961, Foreword)) 31 pp.

- Scacetic
- The First Lesson in Chess
- Dunce's Chess in Three Grades
- Imperial Fiddlesticks
- The Queen's Relations
- The Dodo's Chess
- Rettah
- Simpletonry
- Alician
- The Black King's Complaint
- Tweedledee and Tweedledum
- Mock Turtle's Pseudomorphy
- Damification
- A New Pudding
- Podospherism
- Contramatic
- The Rules According to the March Hare
- Knightmares
- Gryphon's Fancy and Fun
- The Realm of Circum Morus
- The Caterpillar's Idea of C.C.C.

Challenge and Delight of Chessical and Decimal (1970), 14 pp.

Chesshire-Cat-Playeth Looking-Glass Chessys (1970) Part I, 14 pp.

- The Queen of Hearts' Chess
- Capricorn Chess
- The Black King's Complaint
- The Rules According to the March Hare
- Identific
- Synchronistic Chess
- Jabberwocky Chess
- Dodo Chess

Chesshire-Cat-Playeth Looking-Glass Chessys (1970) Part II, 13 pp.

- The Chesshire Cat's Grin
- Scaci Partonici
- A Chess Reflection
- Demigorgons
- The Mad Tea Party
- Knightmares
- Scaci Partonici

Chessical Cubism or Chess in Space (1971), 16 pp.

- Cubic Chess
- Tamerlane Variation of Cubic Chess
- Sphinxian Chess
- The Compulsion Sphinx Chess Variations
- Ecila Chess

100 Squares for Chess + Damante (1971), 16 pp.

- Capablancan Chess
- Decimal Falcon-Hunter (Schulz Chess)
- Half-Queen's Chess
- Decimal Oriental Chess
- Decimal Imitante Q Chess
- Centaur Royal
- Damate Game
- Damatic Chess
- Decimal Duffer's Chess
- Wyvern Chess
- Dabbabante Chess
- Decimal Butter
- Decimal Obstacles Chess
- Chimaera
- Gorgona
- Circean
- Ambi-Chess
- Decimal Scaci Partonici

My Game for 2000 A.D. and After (1972), 12 pp.

Enduring Spirit of Dasapada (1973), 19 pp.

- Dasapada

Idea for a Personal Game (1973), 12 pp.

- The Basis of Pawn Partonici
- The Idea of Scaci Partonici

Chessery for Duffer and Master (1974), 23 pp.

- Chessery for Duffer and Master
- The Game of Rettah Chess
- Semi-Queen Chess
- The Diversion of Zerta
- Meddlers Chess Game
- The Alice chess Game
- The Idea of Gryphon Chess
- Royal Fury
