= 2000 AD =

2000 AD may refer to:

- 2000, a year in the Anno Domini calendar era
- 2000 AD (comics), a weekly British science-fiction comic
- 2000 AD (film), a Singapore-Hong Kong action movie
- 2000 A.D. (chess variant), a chess variant by V. R. Parton
- 2000 AD: The Ultimate Collection

== See also ==
- 2000 (disambiguation)
