= Circe chess =

Chess variant

Position: e8 black knight, g7 black bishop, e4 white rook, f4 white pawn, g3 white king, d2 white pawn, f1 black king

Black to move. White is threatening 2.Re1# but Black can defend with 1...Ba1!

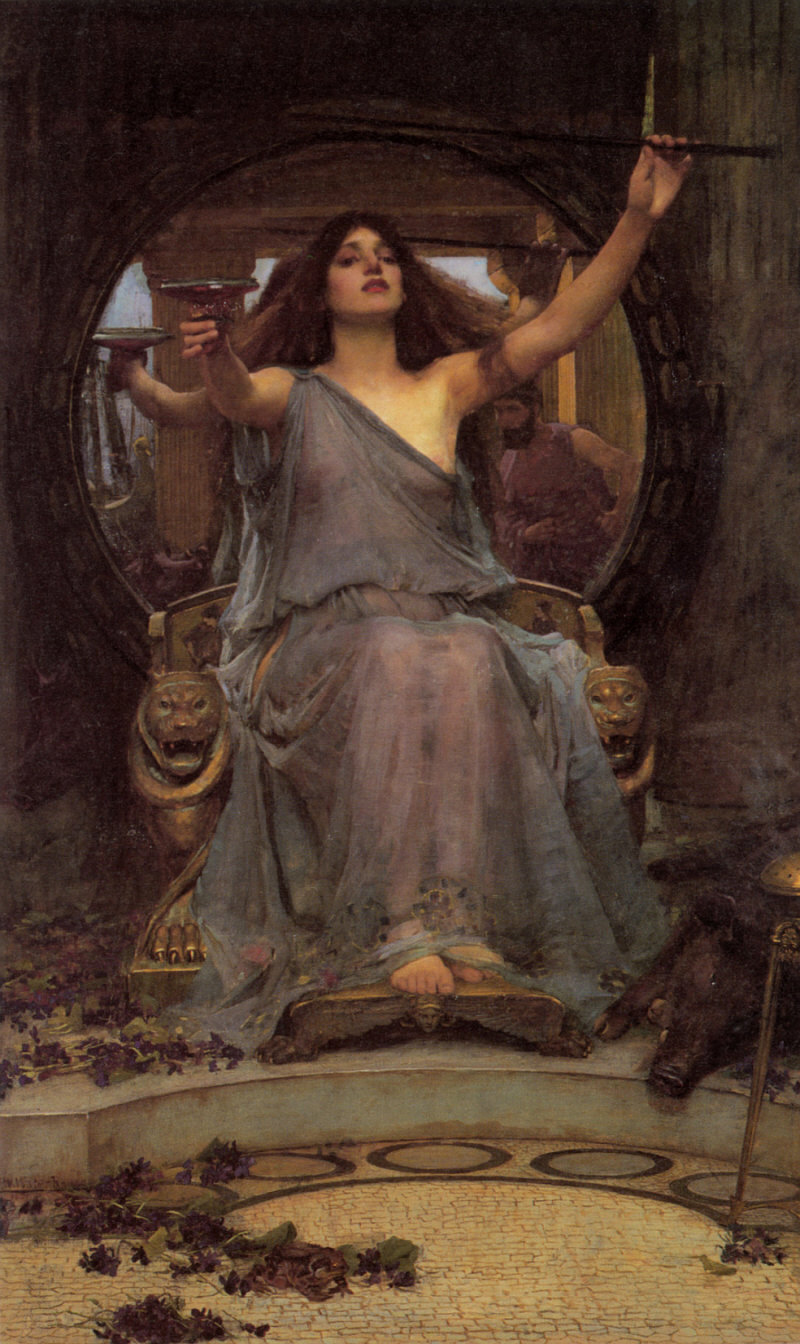
Circe, the namesake of Circe chess

Circe chess (or just Circe) is a chess variant in which captured pieces return to their starting positions as soon as they are captured. The game was invented by French composer Pierre Monréal in 1967 and the rules of Circe chess were first detailed by Monréal and Jean-Pierre Boyer in an article in Problème, 1968. It is named for the enchantress Circe, who in the Odyssey instructs Odysseus on how to enter the Underworld and return, just as pieces in Circe chess can return after being killed.

Circe is rarely played as a variant game (when it is, it is usually combined with progressive chess), but very often employed in composed fairy chess problems.

== Rules ==
These are the most usual rules employed in Circe—there are numerous other forms of the game in which the rules of rebirth may vary.

- Pawns return to the start position on the same file they are captured on.
- Rooks, knights and bishops return to the starting square which is the same colour as the square they are captured on.
- Captured queens are returned to the queen's square.

For instance, a white pawn captured on b4 is reborn on b2; a black knight captured on f6 is reborn on b8; a black rook captured on the same square is reborn on h8. Castling with a reborn rook is permitted. A reborn pawn regains its initial two-step move option. A captured promoted piece is treated as a piece (not a pawn).

If the square that the rebirth should take place on is occupied, either by a friendly or enemy piece, the captured unit is not reborn—it is instead removed from the board and takes no further part in the game (like a capture in orthodox chess).

If a pawn captures via en passant, it would be immediately in front of the reborn opponent's pawn, thus preventing either pawn from moving.

Philip Cohen has suggested that a move that simply reverses the opponent's previous move should not be permitted. (For example, White Qd1, Black Bg4: if White plays Qxg4, the bishop is reborn on c8, and Black should not be permitted to immediately recapture Bxg4.)

== Example ==
The position illustrated demonstrates a couple of unusual effects which can occur in Circe. It is Black to move. White is threatening checkmate with 1.Re1#. Black would not be able to defend with 1...Kxe1 after this move, because the rook is instantly reborn on a1 from where it gives check (Black's bishop does defend a1, and the black king is free to move to e2 or capture at d2, but this is of no consequence as after Kxe1 it will be White's move.). It might appear that there is nothing Black can do to prevent this threat, but in fact he has 1...Ba1! – if now 2.Re1+, Kxe1 is possible because the rook is not reborn because its rebirth square is occupied.

== Notation ==
When notating a Circe game in algebraic notation, it is conventional to place details of where a captured piece has been reborn in parentheses following the move. For example, if in the example diagram, White were to take Black's knight, this would be notated Rxe8(Ng8).

== Circe variants ==
There are many variants of Circe, especially in chess problems. Instead of being reborn on their starting positions the pieces may be reborn on other locations.

- Anticirce: The capturing piece is reborn on its initial square. The captured piece disappears from the board. The rebirth square must be empty or the capture is illegal. There are two types: Type Cheylan: captures on the rebirth square are illegal (i.e. a white rook can not capture on a1). Type Calvet: captures on the rebirth square are legal.
- Assassin Circe: The rebirth occurs even if the rebirth square is occupied. The occupying piece is removed from the board. When a piece is captured on its rebirth square, the capturing piece disappears.
- Chamaeleon Circe: A captured piece (other than a pawn) is reborn as a different piece: knight becomes bishop, bishop becomes rook, rook becomes queen and queen becomes knight. The reborn piece is placed according to the Circe rule for the new piece.
- Circe Parrain: A captured piece is reborn on the square displaced from the capture square by a vector equal to that of the move following the capture. If the following move is castling, then the sum of the king-move and rook-move vectors is used (for a kingside castle, rebirth can occur only if the piece is a pawn captured en passant).
- Circe Rex inclusive: As Circe, but also the kings may be captured. A mate requires that the initial square of the king is occupied.
- Clone Circe: A captured piece is reborn on its initial square but reappears as the piece by which it is captured (not a king).
- CouCou Circe: As Circe, but the rebirth square is that of the capturing piece. Pawns captured by a piece are reborn on the promotion rank, and promote. The promotion is chosen by the capturing side.
- CousCous Circe: As CouCou Circe, but for captures resulting in promotion, the promotion type is chosen by the side whose pawn promotes.
- Diagram Circe: A captured piece is reborn on the position it had on the diagram.
- Equipollents Circe: As Circe Parrain, but the rebirth occurs immediately on a vector equal to the capturing move.
- Kamikaze Circe: The captured piece is reborn on its initial square. The capturing piece disappears.
- Martian Circe: Pieces move in the ordinary manner but capture only from their initial position (if it is unoccupied). Captured pieces disappear from the board.
- Mirror Circe: A captured piece is reborn on a square where a piece of the opposite colour would be reborn in ordinary Circe.
- Platzwechsel Circe (PWC): A captured piece is reborn on the square where the capturer was placed before the capture. Platzwechsel means "position exchange" in German.
- Strict Circe: As ordinary Circe, but the rebirth square must be free for the capture to be legal.
- Symmetrical Circe: As Circe, but the rebirth square is the capture square mirrored across the center of the board.
- Volcanic Circe: As Circe, but if the rebirth square is occupied, the captured piece is 'hidden' under that piece. When that piece moves, the hidden piece is revealed. E.g. white king on f1, white bishop on a6, black king on b6: Black captures Kb6xa6(+wBf1(hidden)) Kf1-e1 (+wBf1).

== See also ==
- Reincarnation Chess
