= Alice chess =

Chess variant played on two boards

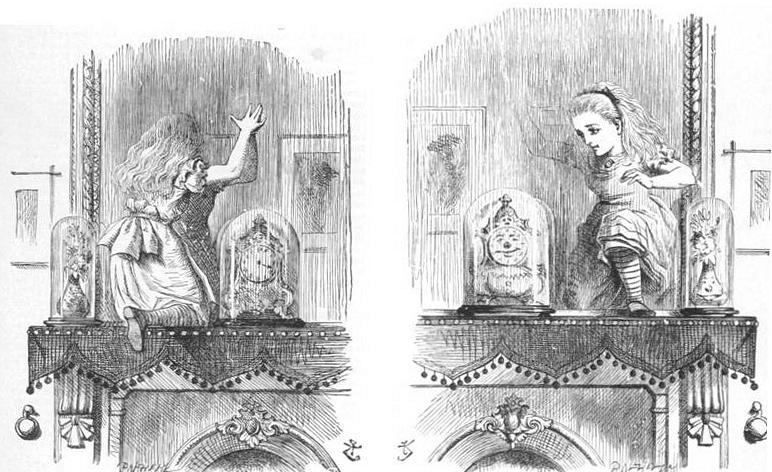
Alice steps through the looking-glass; illustration by Sir John Tenniel.

| a8 | b8 | c8 | d8 | e8 | f8 | g8 | h8 |
| a7 | b7 | c7 | d7 | e7 | f7 | g7 | h7 |
| a6 | b6 | c6 | d6 | e6 | f6 | g6 | h6 |
| a5 | b5 | c5 | d5 | e5 | f5 | g5 | h5 |
| a4 | b4 | c4 | d4 | e4 | f4 | g4 | h4 |
| a3 | b3 | c3 | d3 | e3 | f3 | g3 | h3 |
| a2 | b2 | c2 | d2 | e2 | f2 | g2 | h2 |
| a1 | b1 | c1 | d1 | e1 | f1 | g1 | h1 |

A

| a8 | b8 | c8 | d8 | e8 | f8 | g8 | h8 |
| a7 | b7 | c7 | d7 | e7 | f7 | g7 | h7 |
| a6 | b6 | c6 | d6 | e6 | f6 | g6 | h6 |
| a5 | b5 | c5 | d5 | e5 | f5 | g5 | h5 |
| a4 | b4 | c4 | d4 | e4 | f4 | g4 | h4 |
| a3 | b3 | c3 | d3 | e3 | f3 | g3 | h3 |
| a2 | b2 | c2 | d2 | e2 | f2 | g2 | h2 |
| a1 | b1 | c1 | d1 | e1 | f1 | g1 | h1 |

B

White mates in two moves
by Udo Marks

[Moves returning to board A are notated "/A".]

Solution: 1.Kb1/A! (waiting!)

- 1...Re7 2.Rxe7/A#
- 1...R(e8)–other 2.Re7/A#
- 1...R(g5)–any 2.Rg5/A#
- 1...Ba1 2.Qxa1/A#
- 1...Bb2 2.Qxb2/A#
- 1...B(c3)–other 2.Qc3/A#
- 1...B(h5)–any 2.Nf3/A#
- 1...N(c5)–any 2.Rc5/A#
- 1...N(d6)–any 2.Bd6/A# (2.Bc7/A+? Nd6/A!)
- 1...b6 (or 1...b5) 2.Nc6/A#
- 1...e2 2.Qe3/A#
- 1...g2 2.Bh2/A#! (2.Bg3/A+? Rxg3)

Tries:

- 1.Qd3/A? (threatening 2.Rd5/A#) Nxd3? 2.Rc5/A#, but 1...Ra8+!
- 1.b5/A? Ba1! 2.Qc3/A+ Bxd4/A!

Alice chess is a chess variant invented in 1953 by V. R. Parton which employs two chessboards rather than one, (Note: Since the rules disallow a given square to be occupied on both boards simultaneously, it is possible to play Alice chess using one board only, placing checkers under pieces to indicate they are on board B. A similar technique can be used in computer displays or with pocket–magnetic sets, by turning pieces upside-down instead of using checkers.) and a slight (but significant) alteration to the standard rules of chess. The game is named after the main character "Alice" in Lewis Carroll's work Through the Looking-Glass, where transport through the mirror into an alternative world is portrayed on the chessboards by the after-move transfer of chess pieces between boards A and B.

This simple transfer rule is well known for causing disorientation and confusion in players new to the game, often leading to surprises and amusing mistakes as pieces "disappear" and "reappear" between boards, and pieces interposed to block attacks on one board are simply bypassed on the other. This "nothing is as it seems" experience probably accounts for Alice chess remaining Parton's most popular and successful variant among the numerous others he invented.

== Move rules ==
At the beginning of the game, pieces start in their normal positions on board A, while board B starts empty. At each turn, a player can choose whether to move on board A or B. Pieces move the same as they do in standard chess, but, at the completion of its move, a piece goes "through the looking-glass", transferring to the corresponding square on the opposite board. This simple change has dramatic impact on gameplay.

| a8 | b8 | c8 | d8 | e8 | f8 | g8 | h8 |
| a7 | b7 | c7 | d7 | e7 | f7 | g7 | h7 |
| a6 | b6 | c6 | d6 | e6 | f6 | g6 | h6 |
| a5 | b5 | c5 | d5 | e5 | f5 | g5 | h5 |
| a4 | b4 | c4 | d4 | e4 | f4 | g4 | h4 |
| a3 | b3 | c3 | d3 | e3 | f3 | g3 | h3 |
| a2 | b2 | c2 | d2 | e2 | f2 | g2 | h2 |
| a1 | b1 | c1 | d1 | e1 | f1 | g1 | h1 |

A

| a8 | b8 | c8 | d8 | e8 | f8 | g8 | h8 |
| a7 | b7 | c7 | d7 | e7 | f7 | g7 | h7 |
| a6 | b6 | c6 | d6 | e6 | f6 | g6 | h6 |
| a5 | b5 | c5 | d5 | e5 | f5 | g5 | h5 |
| a4 | b4 | c4 | d4 | e4 | f4 | g4 | h4 |
| a3 | b3 | c3 | d3 | e3 | f3 | g3 | h3 |
| a2 | b2 | c2 | d2 | e2 | f2 | g2 | h2 |
| a1 | b1 | c1 | d1 | e1 | f1 | g1 | h1 |

B

Position after 1.Nf3 e6 2.Ne5 Bc5

For example, after the opening moves 1. Nf3 e6, the white knight and black pawn transfer after moving on board A to their corresponding squares on board B. If the game continued 2. Ne5 Bc5, the knight returns to board A and the bishop finishes on board B (see diagram).

A move in Alice chess has two basic stipulations: the move must be legal on the board on which it is played, and the square transferred to on the opposite board must be vacant. Consequently, a piece can capture only on the board upon which it currently stands; it then transfers to the opposite board, as for a non-capturing move.

| a8 | b8 | c8 | d8 | e8 | f8 | g8 | h8 |
| a7 | b7 | c7 | d7 | e7 | f7 | g7 | h7 |
| a6 | b6 | c6 | d6 | e6 | f6 | g6 | h6 |
| a5 | b5 | c5 | d5 | e5 | f5 | g5 | h5 |
| a4 | b4 | c4 | d4 | e4 | f4 | g4 | h4 |
| a3 | b3 | c3 | d3 | e3 | f3 | g3 | h3 |
| a2 | b2 | c2 | d2 | e2 | f2 | g2 | h2 |
| a1 | b1 | c1 | d1 | e1 | f1 | g1 | h1 |

A

| a8 | b8 | c8 | d8 | e8 | f8 | g8 | h8 |
| a7 | b7 | c7 | d7 | e7 | f7 | g7 | h7 |
| a6 | b6 | c6 | d6 | e6 | f6 | g6 | h6 |
| a5 | b5 | c5 | d5 | e5 | f5 | g5 | h5 |
| a4 | b4 | c4 | d4 | e4 | f4 | g4 | h4 |
| a3 | b3 | c3 | d3 | e3 | f3 | g3 | h3 |
| a2 | b2 | c2 | d2 | e2 | f2 | g2 | h2 |
| a1 | b1 | c1 | d1 | e1 | f1 | g1 | h1 |

B

Position after 3.Nxf7 Bg1

To demonstrate, if the above game continued 3. Nxf7, the knight transfers to board B. Then with Black to move, neither 3...Kxf7 nor 3...Bxf2+ are possible. Black cannot play 3...Qd4 either, since the queen may not hop over the pawn on d7. But the move 3... Bg1 is possible (see diagram), even though a white pawn is on f2 on board A. (The bishop move on board B is legal, and the square transferred to, g1 on board A, is vacant.)

While making a move on the first board, the player is allowed to remain in check on the second board, if the transferred piece then interposes to block the check.

A player must not be in check on the first board after making the move but before the transfer; thus the king cannot transfer out of check.

A player must also not be in check on either board after the transfer; thus they must not put themself in discovered check on the first board by making the transfer, and the king cannot transfer into check on the second board.

Castling is largely regarded as permitted in Alice chess; both king and rook would then transfer to the second board.

The en passant capture is normally excluded, but it can be included. In most such games, the target square is considered to be the square passed over on the first board, though opinions differ.

== Early mates ==
=== Fool's mate ===
| a8 | b8 | c8 | d8 | e8 | f8 | g8 | h8 |
| a7 | b7 | c7 | d7 | e7 | f7 | g7 | h7 |
| a6 | b6 | c6 | d6 | e6 | f6 | g6 | h6 |
| a5 | b5 | c5 | d5 | e5 | f5 | g5 | h5 |
| a4 | b4 | c4 | d4 | e4 | f4 | g4 | h4 |
| a3 | b3 | c3 | d3 | e3 | f3 | g3 | h3 |
| a2 | b2 | c2 | d2 | e2 | f2 | g2 | h2 |
| a1 | b1 | c1 | d1 | e1 | f1 | g1 | h1 |

A

| a8 | b8 | c8 | d8 | e8 | f8 | g8 | h8 |
| a7 | b7 | c7 | d7 | e7 | f7 | g7 | h7 |
| a6 | b6 | c6 | d6 | e6 | f6 | g6 | h6 |
| a5 | b5 | c5 | d5 | e5 | f5 | g5 | h5 |
| a4 | b4 | c4 | d4 | e4 | f4 | g4 | h4 |
| a3 | b3 | c3 | d3 | e3 | f3 | g3 | h3 |
| a2 | b2 | c2 | d2 | e2 | f2 | g2 | h2 |
| a1 | b1 | c1 | d1 | e1 | f1 | g1 | h1 |

B

Fool's Mate

Several exist; one is as follows: 1. e4 d5 2. Be2 dxe4?? 3. Bb5# (see diagram).

At first glance, it might seem that Black can simply interpose a piece between White's bishop and his king to block the check (for example, 3...Bd7 or 3...Nc6 or 3...c6). But any piece so interposed immediately "disappears" when it transfers to board B. And Black cannot escape check by fleeing to the opposite board via 3...Kd7, because the move is not a legal move on board A. Therefore, it is checkmate.

Another form of fool's mate: 1. e4 d6 2. Bc4 Qxd2?? 3. Bb5#

And another: 1. e4 e5 2. Qh5 Nf6?? 3. Qxe5#

=== Scholar's mate ===
| a8 | b8 | c8 | d8 | e8 | f8 | g8 | h8 |
| a7 | b7 | c7 | d7 | e7 | f7 | g7 | h7 |
| a6 | b6 | c6 | d6 | e6 | f6 | g6 | h6 |
| a5 | b5 | c5 | d5 | e5 | f5 | g5 | h5 |
| a4 | b4 | c4 | d4 | e4 | f4 | g4 | h4 |
| a3 | b3 | c3 | d3 | e3 | f3 | g3 | h3 |
| a2 | b2 | c2 | d2 | e2 | f2 | g2 | h2 |
| a1 | b1 | c1 | d1 | e1 | f1 | g1 | h1 |

A

| a8 | b8 | c8 | d8 | e8 | f8 | g8 | h8 |
| a7 | b7 | c7 | d7 | e7 | f7 | g7 | h7 |
| a6 | b6 | c6 | d6 | e6 | f6 | g6 | h6 |
| a5 | b5 | c5 | d5 | e5 | f5 | g5 | h5 |
| a4 | b4 | c4 | d4 | e4 | f4 | g4 | h4 |
| a3 | b3 | c3 | d3 | e3 | f3 | g3 | h3 |
| a2 | b2 | c2 | d2 | e2 | f2 | g2 | h2 |
| a1 | b1 | c1 | d1 | e1 | f1 | g1 | h1 |

B

Scholar's Mate

1. e4 h5 2. Be2 Rh4 3. Bxh5 Rxe4+ 4. Kf1 d5 5. Qe2? (threatening 6.Qb5#) 5... Bh3# (see diagram).

1. d4 e6 2. Qd6 Be7? 3. Qe5+ Kf8 4. Bh6# (Seitz–Nadvorney, 1973).

== Example game ==
Paul Yearout vs. George Jelliss, 1996 AISE Grand Prix
[Annotations by George Jelliss; moves returning to board A are notated "/A".]

| a8 | b8 | c8 | d8 | e8 | f8 | g8 | h8 |
| a7 | b7 | c7 | d7 | e7 | f7 | g7 | h7 |
| a6 | b6 | c6 | d6 | e6 | f6 | g6 | h6 |
| a5 | b5 | c5 | d5 | e5 | f5 | g5 | h5 |
| a4 | b4 | c4 | d4 | e4 | f4 | g4 | h4 |
| a3 | b3 | c3 | d3 | e3 | f3 | g3 | h3 |
| a2 | b2 | c2 | d2 | e2 | f2 | g2 | h2 |
| a1 | b1 | c1 | d1 | e1 | f1 | g1 | h1 |

A

| a8 | b8 | c8 | d8 | e8 | f8 | g8 | h8 |
| a7 | b7 | c7 | d7 | e7 | f7 | g7 | h7 |
| a6 | b6 | c6 | d6 | e6 | f6 | g6 | h6 |
| a5 | b5 | c5 | d5 | e5 | f5 | g5 | h5 |
| a4 | b4 | c4 | d4 | e4 | f4 | g4 | h4 |
| a3 | b3 | c3 | d3 | e3 | f3 | g3 | h3 |
| a2 | b2 | c2 | d2 | e2 | f2 | g2 | h2 |
| a1 | b1 | c1 | d1 | e1 | f1 | g1 | h1 |

B

Position after 11.0-0-0

1. d3 Nf6 2. Nc3 c5 3. Qd2 Nc6 (To give a direct check to the king the checking piece must come from the other board, so it is necessary first to transfer forces to the other board.) 4. d4/A Rb8 (This way of developing rooks is common in Alice chess.) 5. e3 g5 (This prevents the Bc1 coming to g5 or f4.) 6. f4 Rbg8/A (Guarding Pg5 on the other board.) 7. Nd5/A h6 8. Nf3 gxf4/A (Inconsistent play on my part. Ne4/A now looks better to me.) 9. Bxf4 Rg4 10. Be5/A Rh5 11. 0-0-0 [diagram] (Perhaps judging that the activated black force now being on the second board the king might be safer there. The black queen is now effectively 'pinned': 11...Q–c7/b6?? 12.Qd8#.) 11... Ne4/A 12. Bc7 Ra4/A 13. Ba6 Bg7 (The idea is 14...Rc4+ 15.c3/Nc3 Bxc3+/A.) 14. Bb5/A Rc4+ 15. Kb1/A Rf5/A 16. Ba5/A (Desperate measures now needed to save the 'pinned' queen.) 16... Rxd5 17. Qxd5/A Qxa5 (Threatening 18...Qa1#.) 18. a3 Qd2/A 19. Qxd7+ Kf8 (I put these two moves in as an 'if...then' clause, but it seems Paul may not have noticed the discovered check, so perhaps I should have kept quiet!) 20. Qxg7/A Qc3 (Stops Qh8#.) 21. Rd8/A 1–0 (Black resigns. If 21...Bd7/Be6/Nf6 [then] 22.Qg8/Re8/Qh8#.)

== Variations ==
Rule modifications have sprouted a number of variations of Alice chess.

=== Looking glass Alice chess ===
The black army starts out on the opposite board (board B).

=== Ms. Alice chess ===
Null or zero moves are permitted. (A move consisting of piece transfer only – from the current square a piece sits on, to the corresponding square, if vacant, on the opposite board.) A king cannot escape check with a zero move, and castling is denied if either king or rook have made a zero move. By John Ishkan (1973).

=== O'Donohue chess ===
Alice chess rules, except that a move is permitted even though the square normally transferred to on the opposite board is occupied. (In that case, the transfer portion of the move is omitted.) By Michael O'Donohue (2003).

=== Duo chess ===
Position: a8 black rook, b8 black queen, c8 black king, d8 black rook, a7 black knight, b7 black bishop, c7 black bishop, d7 black knight, a6 black pawn, b6 black pawn, c6 black pawn, d6 black pawn, a3 white pawn, b3 white pawn, c3 white pawn, d3 white pawn, a2 white knight, b2 white bishop, c2 white bishop, d2 white knight, a1 white rook, b1 white queen, c1 white king, d1 white rook

8×4 version of Alice chess

Black starts out on board B; transfers are optional; non-pawn pieces may make zero moves (and may capture in so doing); a king is checked when an opposing piece sits on the king's zero square; mate must cover the king's ability to flee via a zero move. By Jed Stone (1981).

Parton also introduced a smaller, 8×4 version of Alice chess (see diagram). He also observed that Alice chess can be played using three boards instead of two. (Players then having a choice between two boards when transferring pieces.)

Alice chess rules can be adopted by practically any other chess variant too, by simply doubling the number of gameboards in the variant and applying the piece transfer policy (for example, Raumschach using two 5×5×5 boards).

== See also ==
- Knightmare Chess
- Looking-glass chess – also by V. R. Parton
- Three-dimensional chess
