= 2000 A.D. (chess variant) =

Chess variant

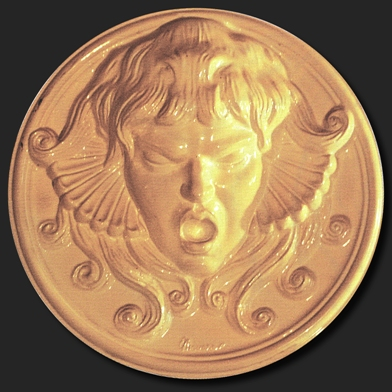
The Gorgon—a fearsome creature in Greek mythology and in Parton's 2000 A.D.

2000 A.D. is a chess variant created by V. R. Parton which employs fairy chess pieces on a 10×10 board. Parton published the variant in his 1972 monograph My Game for 2000 A.D. and After.

== Description ==
Parton describes his invention as "the game for Future Players in the Next Millennium", feeling that to be sufficiently challenging for later generations a variant should possess a larger board and increased possibilities. The distinction between moving and capturing methods of most of the pieces is a feature characteristic of the game. (Note: "The feature of the game, possibly inspired by Ultima, is that all the major pieces move as a queen but each has its own method of capture.")

The Gorgon, Ximaera (Chimaera), and Fury are all terrifying female monsters from Greek mythology. The Dragon is also referred to by Parton as female (Parton 1974:19). The Attendant stands next to the Empress at the beginning of the game and moves as a chess king, but is stripped of all normal royal powers. (Note: Capturable and the weakest of the non-pawn pieces, the Attendant probably best "serves as a screen for the empress".)

== Game rules ==
	a	b	c	d	e	f	g	h	i	j
10	a10 D d	b10 M d	c10 black upside-down queen	d10 C d	e10 x d	f10 black queen	g10 C d	h10 black upside-down queen	i10 M d	j10 D d	10
9	a9 black empress	b9 black pawn	c9 black pawn	d9 black pawn	e9 black unicorn	f9 black unicorn	g9 black pawn	h9 black pawn	i9 black pawn	j9 black empress	9
8	a8	b8	c8	d8	e8 black pawn	f8 black pawn	g8	h8	i8	j8	8
7	a7	b7	c7	d7	e7	f7	g7	h7	i7	j7	7
6	a6	b6	c6	d6	e6	f6	g6	h6	i6	j6	6
5	a5	b5	c5	d5	e5	f5	g5	h5	i5	j5	5
4	a4	b4	c4	d4	e4	f4	g4	h4	i4	j4	4
3	a3	b3	c3	d3	e3 white pawn	f3 white pawn	g3	h3	i3	j3	3
2	a2 white empress	b2 white pawn	c2 white pawn	d2 white pawn	e2 white unicorn	f2 white unicorn	g2 white pawn	h2 white pawn	i2 white pawn	j2 white empress	2
1	a1 D l	b1 M l	c1 white upside-down queen	d1 C l	e1 white queen	f1 x l	g1 C l	h1 white upside-down queen	i1 M l	j1 D l	1
	a	b	c	d	e	f	g	h	i	j

2000 A.D. starting position (pawns on e3, f3, e8, and f8 are optional)

White moves first. Capturing the enemy Empress wins the game. There is no castling or checking in 2000 A.D.

=== Pieces that move and capture the same way ===
The following pieces capture the same as they move :

Empress (E)

- Moves as a chess queen;
- If captured the game is over.

Attendant (A)

- Moves as a chess king without royal powers.

Unicorn (U)

- Moves as a chess knight.
- Has the ability to capture Gorgons.

Pawn (P)

- Moves one step straight or diagonally forward;
- Can promote on entering the opponent's half of the board to any piece previously lost.

=== Pieces that move as a queen but have other powers ===
The following pieces move as a chess queen, but capture (or exercise other power) in their own special ways:

Capricorn (C)

- Captures by charging (moving to a vacant square orthogonally or diagonally adjacent to) an enemy piece;
- Can capture up to seven pieces in one turn, if they are all adjacent to the square the Capricorn charges to.
- A Capricorn has the ability to capture Gorgons.

Gorgon (G)

- Captures as a chess queen;
- Petrifies (immobilizes) any enemy piece it attacks;
- If petrified by an enemy Gorgon, does not lose its power to petrify other pieces;
- Can be captured only by a Unicorn or a Capricorn.

Ximaera (X)

- Cannot capture but is subject to capture;
- Swaps places with any enemy piece it attacks;
- If swapped with an enemy Ximaera, the player may reverse-swap them, but not on his next turn.

Dragon (D)

- Captures by leaping an enemy piece to any vacant square immediately beyond it;
- Can make multiple captures in a single turn in the same direction;
- In a multiple capture, a Dragon is immobilized after one of the captures, if a Gorgon attacks it.

Mimotaur (M)

- The Mimotaur (Note: "The Mimotaur (the spelling is correct as the name of this Fury monster) [...]") (presumably a Minotaur that mimics) captures in the same manner as the piece being captured;
- Counter-petrifies an enemy Gorgon;
- Can swap places with an enemy Ximaera;
- A Mimotaur is incapable of attacking another Mimotaur;
- Must be adjacent to the Attendant to capture it;
- Must be in front of and adjacent to a pawn to capture it.

=== Alternate piece ===
The following is an alternate piece; if used, Furies replace Gorgons in the starting position:

Fury (F)

- Combines the powers of all the other pieces "[...] into one Supreme Terror" (Parton 1974:22).

== See also ==
- Ultima

== Notes ==
=== References ===
- Parton, V. R. (1972). My Game for 2000 A.D. and After. WorldCat. p. 12. OCLC 57502218.
- Parton, V. R. (1974). Chessery for Duffer and Master. Amazon. pp. 19–23. ASIN B0007C9VCY.
- Pritchard, D. B. (1994). The Encyclopedia of Chess Variants. Games & Puzzles Publications. ISBN 0-9524142-0-1.
- Pritchard, D. B. (2007). Beasley, John (ed.). The Classified Encyclopedia of Chess Variants. John Beasley. ISBN 978-0-9555168-0-1.
