= Marseillais chess =

Chess variant in which each player moves twice per turn

Marseillais chess (also called Double-Move chess) is a chess variant in which each player moves twice per turn. The rules of the game were first published in Marseillais local newspaper Le Soleil in 1925. The variant became quite popular in the late 1930s with such chess grandmasters as Alexander Alekhine, Richard Réti, Eugene Znosko-Borovsky, and André Chéron playing it.

== Rules ==
A player can either move one piece twice (this is the source of the famous trap in the "balanced" version of the game where White opening with pawn-two appears to be trivially busted by an unprincipled defense with the pawn on an adjacent file) or move two different pieces on their turn. Castling is considered a single move.

When a player gives check on the first move, they lose the second move of their turn. If a player is in check, they must move out of check on the first move of the turn. It is not allowed to move the king into check on the first move of a turn and then move out of check on the second.

En passant capture is allowed even if the opponent moved the corresponding pawn on the first move of their turn. Capturing en passant, however, must be done on the first move of the turn. When two pawns can be captured en passant, both can be captured in the turn.

To ensure White's advantage of moving first is not excessive, usually a "balanced" version of the game is played. In the balanced version, White makes only one move on the first turn. The moves are made in the following order: White, Black, Black, White, White, Black, Black, and so on. This rule was introduced in 1963 by Robert Bruce and has gained wide acceptance since then.

== See also ==
- Progressive chess
