= Progressive chess =

Chess variant with more moves per turn

Progressive chess is a chess variant in which players, rather than just making one move per turn, play progressively longer series of moves. The game starts with White making one move, then Black makes two consecutive moves, White replies with three, Black makes four and so on. Progressive chess can be combined with other variants; for example, when Circe chess is played as a game, it is usually progressively. Progressive chess is considered particularly apt for playing correspondence chess using mail or some other slow medium, because of the relatively small number of moves in a typical game.

== Rules ==
There are two main varieties of progressive chess: Italian progressive chess and Scottish progressive chess (otherwise known as Scotch chess). The two have the following rules in common:

- A check must be escaped from on the first move of a series—if this cannot be done, it is checkmate and the game is lost.
- En passant captures of pawns are allowed if the pawn in question moved two squares in one move, but no further, at some point during the last turn, but the capture must be made on the first move of a series.
- If 10 consecutive turns are played with no captures and no pawn moves, then the game is declared a draw unless one of the players can force a checkmate (this is the progressive chess equivalent of the fifty-move rule in orthodox chess).
- If, during their turn, a player has no legal moves but is not in check, the game is a draw by progressive stalemate. (In particular it is possible to save a draw by stalemating oneself.)

Italian and Scottish progressive chess are distinguished by rules on when a player is allowed to give check:

- Scottish progressive chess: check may be given on any move of a series, but a check ends the series—all further moves that would otherwise be allowed are forfeited. This has no effect on the next series: the other player will receive the normal number of moves. (For example, if Black on move six checks immediately, then the second through sixth moves are forfeited; but White will still be able to play seven moves on the next turn.)
- Italian progressive chess: a check may only be given on the last move of a full series (for example, on move six, a check can only be given on the sixth move)—giving a check at any other point in a series is illegal. In particular, if the only way to escape a check is to give check on the first move of the series, then the game is lost by the player in check by "progressive checkmate".

In practice, the difference between the Scottish and Italian rules is not often relevant. John Beasley examined 416 mating positions that either occurred or could have occurred in games played by the Italian rules; of them 158 were such "progressive checkmates" (Beasley calls them "Italian mates"). In all but two cases (Cassano–Dipilato 1986 and Boniface– Archer 1993), there would have been a mate next turn under the Scottish rules as well; and in Boniface–Archer 1993, White could have given a Scottish mate on his last turn rather than an Italian mate, leaving only one case where the difference in rules would actually have affected the result. (And even in Cassano–Dipilato 1986, Black did not see that he could have given an Italian mate, and the play that followed – ending in a draw – was the best available under Scottish rules, according to Beasley.)

Progressive chess, like orthodox chess, is notated with algebraic notation. However, the numbering of moves is handled slightly differently. Rather than one White and one Black move being given under each move number (leading to notation in orthodox chess like 1.e4 e5 2.Nf3 Nc6 3.Bb5 a6), each turn by each player is given its own move number (leading to notation in progressive chess like 1.e4 2.e5 Nf6 3.Bc4 Qh5 Qxf7#). In this way, the move number is equal to the number of moves in a series available to a player on that turn.

== Other variations ==
There is another form of progressive chess, English progressive chess, which makes quite a significant change to the rules: within each turn, no piece may be moved twice until every other piece which has a legal move has moved once; no piece may move three times until every other piece which can has moved twice; and so on. These restrictions do not carry over from one turn to the next—so the opening 1.e4 2.e6 f6 3.e5 Nf3 Bc4 is legal (White's e-pawn may move again because its moves are on different turns), but the sequence 1.e4 2.e6 f6 3.e5 Ba6 Bxb7 is not (the bishop has made two moves, but there are many other white pieces which have not moved on that turn). There is no en passant capture under English rules, and rules on checks follow the Scottish rules.

Progressive Take-All uses the same rules as Progressive chess, but involves capturing all pieces of your opponent's instead of checkmate. Pawns can also be promoted to Kings.

In Logical progressive chess (by Paul Byway, Variant Chess 18, automne 1995) there's no castling or pawn two advance (hence no en-passant capture) since these rules were added to speed up the game, which is not relevant in progressive form.

== See also ==
- Marseillais chess—a chess variant in which each player moves twice per turn.
