= List of chess variants =

Gliński's hexagonal chess by Władysław Gliński (1936) was popular in Eastern Europe with a reported half-million players.

This page is a list of chess variants. Many thousands of variants exist. The 2007 catalogue The Encyclopedia of Chess Variants estimates that there are well over 2,000, and many more were considered too trivial for inclusion in the catalogue.

Position: a8 black rook, b8 black knight, c8 black bishop, d8 black queen, e8 black king, f8 black bishop, g8 black knight, h8 black rook, a7 black pawn, b7 black pawn, c7 black pawn, d7 black pawn, e7 black pawn, f7 black pawn, g7 black pawn, h7 black pawn, a2 white pawn, b2 white pawn, c2 white pawn, d2 white pawn, e2 white pawn, f2 white pawn, g2 white pawn, h2 white pawn, a1 white rook, b1 white knight, c1 white bishop, d1 white queen, e1 white king, f1 white bishop, g1 white knight, h1 white rook

Standard chess

== Contemporary chess variants ==
The chess variants listed below are derived from chess by changing one or more of the many rules of the game. The rules can be grouped into categories, from the most innocuous (starting position) to the most dramatic (adding chance/randomness to the gameplay after the initial piece placement). If a variant changes rules from multiple categories, it belongs to the sub-section below corresponding to the later-listed category.

- Starting position and armies
- Piece types
- Midgame rules and end-of-game rules
- Board shape
- Number of players
- Use of hidden information or chance

Names that represent a set of variants are annotated with "[multivariant]" after their name. All variants use an 8x8 board unless otherwise specified.

=== Variant starting position (rectangular board, standard piece types and rules) ===
Many variants employ standard chess rules and mechanics, but vary the number of pieces, or their starting positions. In most such variants, the pawns are placed on their usual squares, but the position of other pieces is either randomly determined or selected by the players. The motivation for these variants is usually to nullify established opening knowledge. The downside of these variants is that the initial position usually has less harmony and balance than the standard chess position.

Position: a8 white rook, b8 white knight, c8 white bishop, d8 white king, e8 white queen, f8 white bishop, g8 white knight, h8 white rook, a7 white pawn, b7 white pawn, c7 white pawn, d7 white pawn, e7 white pawn, f7 white pawn, g7 white pawn, h7 white pawn, a2 black pawn, b2 black pawn, c2 black pawn, d2 black pawn, e2 black pawn, f2 black pawn, g2 black pawn, h2 black pawn, a1 black rook, b1 black knight, c1 black bishop, d1 black king, e1 black queen, f1 black bishop, g1 black knight, h1 black rook

Upside-down chess starting position (White sits at bottom)

==== Fixed positions ====
- Active chess: Played on a 9×8 board, adding a queen with an extra pawn in front. Invented by G. Kuzmichov (1989), whose students tested the game, deciding that the optimal starting position was to place the second queen on the eighth or ninth files.
- Displacement chess [multivariant]: Some pieces in the initial position are exchanged but the rules remain exactly the same. Some examples of this may be that the king and queen are flipped, or the knight on the b-file is traded with the bishop on the f-file.

	a	b	c	d	e	f	g	h	i	j	k	l	m	n	o	p
12	a12 black rook	b12 black knight	c12 black bishop	d12 black queen	e12 black king	f12 black bishop	g12 black knight	h12 black rook	i12 black rook	j12 black knight	k12 black bishop	l12 black queen	m12 black king	n12 black bishop	o12 black knight	p12 black rook	12
11	a11 black pawn	b11 black pawn	c11 black pawn	d11 black pawn	e11 black pawn	f11 black pawn	g11 black pawn	h11 black pawn	i11 black pawn	j11 black pawn	k11 black pawn	l11 black pawn	m11 black pawn	n11 black pawn	o11 black pawn	p11 black pawn	11
10	a10	b10	c10	d10	e10	f10	g10	h10	i10	j10	k10	l10	m10	n10	o10	p10	10
9	a9	b9	c9	d9	e9	f9	g9	h9	i9	j9	k9	l9	m9	n9	o9	p9	9
8	a8	b8	c8	d8	e8	f8	g8	h8	i8	j8	k8	l8	m8	n8	o8	p8	8
7	a7	b7	c7	d7	e7	f7	g7	h7	i7	j7	k7	l7	m7	n7	o7	p7	7
6	a6	b6	c6	d6	e6	f6	g6	h6	i6	j6	k6	l6	m6	n6	o6	p6	6
5	a5	b5	c5	d5	e5	f5	g5	h5	i5	j5	k5	l5	m5	n5	o5	p5	5
4	a4	b4	c4	d4	e4	f4	g4	h4	i4	j4	k4	l4	m4	n4	o4	p4	4
3	a3	b3	c3	d3	e3	f3	g3	h3	i3	j3	k3	l3	m3	n3	o3	p3	3
2	a2 white pawn	b2 white pawn	c2 white pawn	d2 white pawn	e2 white pawn	f2 white pawn	g2 white pawn	h2 white pawn	i2 white pawn	j2 white pawn	k2 white pawn	l2 white pawn	m2 white pawn	n2 white pawn	o2 white pawn	p2 white pawn	2
1	a1 white rook	b1 white knight	c1 white bishop	d1 white queen	e1 white king	f1 white bishop	g1 white knight	h1 white rook	i1 white rook	j1 white knight	k1 white bishop	l1 white queen	m1 white king	n1 white bishop	o1 white knight	p1 white rook	1
	a	b	c	d	e	f	g	h	i	j	k	l	m	n	o	p

Double Chess by Julian Hayward
- Double chess: Two full armies per side on a 12×16 board, the first to mate an enemy king wins. Pawns advance up to four steps on their first move. Capablanca found the game "remarkably interesting". Invented by Julian Hayward (1916).
- Endgame chess (or the Pawns Game, with unknown origins): Players start the game with only pawns and a king. Normal check, checkmate, en passant, and pawn promotion rules apply.
- Los Alamos chess (or anti-clerical chess): Played on a 6×6 board without bishops. This was the first chess-like game played by a computer program.
- Upside-down chess: The white and black pieces are switched so that White's pieces are on the 8th rank, with pawns on the 7th rank, one step away from promotion. The starting position looks like a standard chess starting position, but from the other player's perspective. As the pawns are blocked by pieces in the starting position, the game always starts with a knight move, and smothered mates are common.

==== Player-chosen positions ====
- Casablanca chess: The starting position is chosen from a famous historic game; usually an interesting middlegame position. The position is verified to be approximately equal by a computer, and should have winning chances for both sides. The first Casablanca chess tournament was played in May 2024, and won by Magnus Carlsen.
- Pre-chess: The game starts with white and black pawns set as usual, but the initial position of other pieces is selected by the players. White first places one of their pieces on their first rank, and then Black does the same. Players continue to alternate in this manner until all pieces have been placed, with the only restriction being that bishops must be on opposite-colour squares. The game then proceeds in the usual way. Proposed by Pal Benko in 1978.
- Polgar reform chess [multivariant]: In his book Reform-Chess (1997), László Polgár proposed several variants played on board of size 5×8, 6×8, 8×6, or 9×6. The initial piece setup is determined by players in the same way as in Benko's Pre-chess. There are special rules for castling depending on the board. Polgár recommended these variants to train creativity and to speed up the game.

==== Random positions ====
Position: a8 black bishop, b8 black knight, c8 black rook, d8 black bishop, e8 black knight, f8 black king, g8 black rook, h8 black queen, a7 black pawn, b7 black pawn, c7 black pawn, d7 black pawn, e7 black pawn, f7 black pawn, g7 black pawn, h7 black pawn, a2 white pawn, b2 white pawn, c2 white pawn, d2 white pawn, e2 white pawn, f2 white pawn, g2 white pawn, h2 white pawn, a1 white bishop, b1 white knight, c1 white rook, d1 white bishop, e1 white knight, f1 white king, g1 white rook, h1 white queen

Chess960, one of the 960 possible starting positions

- Fischer Random Chess (also known as Chess960 and more recently as Freestyle Chess): The placement of the pieces on the first rank is randomized; although there are rules such as the 2 starting Bishops have to be on different colour squares, and the King has to start between the 2 Rooks. The opponent's pieces mirror it. Invented by Bobby Fischer (1996).
- Transcendental Chess: Similar to Chess960, but the opening white and black positions do not necessarily mirror each other. By Maxwell Lawrence (1978).

==== Unequal armies ====
In these variants, White and Black do not necessarily begin with the same quantities of each piece type (for example, White may begin with more pawns than Black).

- Dunsany's Chess (and the similar Horde chess): One side (Black) has standard chess pieces, and the other side (White) has 32 pawns. Black moves first. By Lord Dunsany (1942). Horde chess has a slightly different pawn arrangement, and White moves first.
- Peasants' Revolt: White has a king and eight pawns (the peasants) against Black's king, pawn, and four knights (the nobles). Black has the advantage. To narrow the contest, the game has also been played with three knights (on b8, c8, and g8) instead of four. By R. L. Frey (1947).
- Really Bad Chess: An asymmetric mobile video game variant by Zach Gage (2016). Each player has one king and fifteen other pieces selected at random.
- Weak!: White has the usual pieces, Black has one king, seven knights, and sixteen pawns. Attributed to Ralph Betza (1973).

Position: a8 black rook, b8 black knight, c8 black bishop, d8 black queen, e8 black king, f8 black bishop, g8 black knight, h8 black rook, a7 black pawn, b7 black pawn, c7 black pawn, d7 black pawn, e7 black pawn, f7 black pawn, g7 black pawn, h7 black pawn, a4 white pawn, b4 white pawn, c4 white pawn, d4 white pawn, e4 white pawn, f4 white pawn, g4 white pawn, h4 white pawn, a3 white pawn, b3 white pawn, c3 white pawn, d3 white pawn, e3 white pawn, f3 white pawn, g3 white pawn, h3 white pawn, a2 white pawn, b2 white pawn, c2 white pawn, d2 white pawn, e2 white pawn, f2 white pawn, g2 white pawn, h2 white pawn, a1 white pawn, b1 white pawn, c1 white pawn, d1 white pawn, e1 white pawn, f1 white pawn, g1 white pawn, h1 white pawn

Dunsany's Chess by Lord Dunsany

Position: b8 black knight, c8 black knight, e8 black king, f8 black knight, g8 black knight, e7 black pawn, a2 white pawn, b2 white pawn, c2 white pawn, d2 white pawn, e2 white pawn, f2 white pawn, g2 white pawn, h2 white pawn, e1 white king

Peasants' Revolt by R. L. Frey

Position: a8 black knight, b8 black queen, c8 black pawn, d8 black bishop, e8 black king, f8 black pawn, g8 black pawn, h8 black rook, a7 black bishop, b7 black pawn, c7 black knight, d7 black knight, e7 black bishop, f7 black queen, g7 black rook, h7 black pawn, a2 white knight, b2 white knight, c2 white knight, d2 white bishop, e2 white pawn, f2 white queen, g2 white rook, h2 white queen, a1 white bishop, b1 white rook, c1 white queen, d1 white queen, e1 white king, f1 white pawn, g1 white knight, h1 white queen

Really Bad Chess (example) by Zach Gage

Position: a8 black knight, b8 black knight, c8 black knight, d8 black knight, e8 black king, f8 black knight, g8 black knight, h8 black knight, a7 black pawn, b7 black pawn, c7 black pawn, d7 black pawn, e7 black pawn, f7 black pawn, g7 black pawn, h7 black pawn, c6 black pawn, f6 black pawn, b5 black pawn, c5 black pawn, d5 black pawn, e5 black pawn, f5 black pawn, g5 black pawn, a2 white pawn, b2 white pawn, c2 white pawn, d2 white pawn, e2 white pawn, f2 white pawn, g2 white pawn, h2 white pawn, a1 white rook, b1 white knight, c1 white bishop, d1 white queen, e1 white king, f1 white bishop, g1 white knight, h1 white rook

Weak! by Ralph Betza

=== Variants with fairy chess pieces ===
Ea5 black rook	Eb5 black knight	Ec5 black king	Ed5 black knight	Ee5 black rook
Ea4 black pawn	Eb4 black pawn	Ec4 black pawn	Ed4 black pawn	Ee4 black pawn
Ea3	Eb3	Ec3	Ed3	Ee3
Ea2	Eb2	Ec2	Ed2	Ee2
Ea1	Eb1	Ec1	Ed1	Ee1

E

Da5 N d	Db5 black bishop	Dc5 black queen	Dd5 N d	De5 black bishop
Da4 black pawn	Db4 black pawn	Dc4 black pawn	Dd4 black pawn	De4 black pawn
Da3	Db3	Dc3	Dd3	De3
Da2	Db2	Dc2	Dd2	De2
Da1	Db1	Dc1	Dd1	De1

D

Ca5	Cb5	Cc5	Cd5	Ce5
Ca4	Cb4	Cc4	Cd4	Ce4
Ca3	Cb3	Cc3	Cd3	Ce3
Ca2	Cb2	Cc2	Cd2	Ce2
Ca1	Cb1	Cc1	Cd1	Ce1

C

Ba5	Bb5	Bc5	Bd5	Be5
Ba4	Bb4	Bc4	Bd4	Be4
Ba3	Bb3	Bc3	Bd3	Be3
Ba2 white pawn	Bb2 white pawn	Bc2 white pawn	Bd2 white pawn	Be2 white pawn
Ba1 white bishop	Bb1 N l	Bc1 white queen	Bd1 white bishop	Be1 N l

B

Aa5	Ab5	Ac5	Ad5	Ae5
Aa4	Ab4	Ac4	Ad4	Ae4
Aa3	Ab3	Ac3	Ad3	Ae3
Aa2 white pawn	Ab2 white pawn	Ac2 white pawn	Ad2 white pawn	Ae2 white pawn
Aa1 white rook	Ab1 white knight	Ac1 white king	Ad1 white knight	Ae1 white rook

A
Raumschach starting position. Inverted knights represent unicorns.

	a	b	c	d	e	f	g	h	i	j
10	a10 black upside-down rook	b10	c10	d10	e10	f10	g10	h10	i10	j10 black upside-down rook	10
9	a9 B d	b9 black rook	c9 black knight	d9 black bishop	e9 black queen	f9 black king	g9 black bishop	h9 black knight	i9 black rook	j9 B d	9
8	a8 black pawn	b8 black pawn	c8 black pawn	d8 black pawn	e8 black pawn	f8 black pawn	g8 black pawn	h8 black pawn	i8 black pawn	j8 black pawn	8
7	a7	b7	c7	d7	e7	f7	g7	h7	i7	j7	7
6	a6	b6	c6	d6	e6	f6	g6	h6	i6	j6	6
5	a5	b5	c5	d5	e5	f5	g5	h5	i5	j5	5
4	a4	b4	c4	d4	e4	f4	g4	h4	i4	j4	4
3	a3 white pawn	b3 white pawn	c3 white pawn	d3 white pawn	e3 white pawn	f3 white pawn	g3 white pawn	h3 white pawn	i3 white pawn	j3 white pawn	3
2	a2 B l	b2 white rook	c2 white knight	d2 white bishop	e2 white queen	f2 white king	g2 white bishop	h2 white knight	i2 white rook	j2 B l	2
1	a1 white upside-down rook	b1	c1	d1	e1	f1	g1	h1	i1	j1 white upside-down rook	1
	a	b	c	d	e	f	g	h	i	j

Shako starting position. Cannons (shown as inverted rooks) are on a1, j1, a10, and j10. Elephants (shown as inverted bishops) are on a2, j2, a9, and j9.

==== Variants with fairy pieces on a standard board ====
Most of the pieces in these variants are borrowed from chess. The game goal and rules are also very similar to those in chess; however, these variants include one or more fairy pieces which move differently from chess pieces.

- Baroque chess (or Ultima): Pieces on the first row move like queens, and pieces on the second row move like rooks. They are named after their unusual capturing methods. For example, leaper, immobilizer and coordinator.
- Berolina chess: All pawns are replaced with Berolina pawns, that move diagonally and capture orthogonally.
- Chess with different armies: Two sides use different sets of fairy pieces. There are several armies of approximately equal strength to choose from including the standard FIDE chess army.
- Falcon-Hunter Chess: A falcon moves forward as a bishop; backward as a rook. The hunter moves forward as a rook; backward as a bishop. Players introduce the fairies as the game progresses. By Karl Schulz (1943).
- Grasshopper chess [multivariant]: The pawns can promote to grasshopper, or grasshoppers are on the board in the initial position.
- Pocket Mutation Chess: Player can put a piece temporarily into the pocket, optionally mutating it into another (including fairy) piece.
- Spartan chess: Black (the Spartans) has an army headed by two kings, which otherwise consists exclusively of non-standard pieces, and battles the standard FIDE army (the Persians) of white.
- Torpedo chess: Pawns are replaced with torpedo pawns, which can move two squares forwards anywhere on the board as opposed to only on the first move. Pawns that move two squares can be captured en passant on the very next move. The rest of the pieces remain unchanged.
- Way of the Knight (WOTN): Invented by Ralph Betza, incorporating two elements from tabletop role-playing games. Begins with the standard starting position and pieces, however through capturing and advancing up the board pieces can earn "experience", and a sufficiently experienced piece is upgraded to a more powerful one. Upgrades include various fairy pieces, and involve player choices of "alignment".

==== Variants with knighted fairy pieces: Empress, Princess, and Amazon ====
There are a number of variants which use the empress (rook + knight), also called marshall or chancellor.. A number also use the princess (bishop + knight), also called cardinal, archbishop, janus, paladin, or minister. A third knighted piece is the amazon (queen + knight). To adapt to the new pieces, the board is usually extended to 10×8 or 10×10, with additional pawns added.

- Almost Chess: Uses an 8×8 board, with the conventional starting position, but queens are replaced by chancellors (empresses). By Ralph Betza (1977). A related variant is Sort of Almost Chess, also by Ralph Betza (1994), where one player has a queen and the other has a chancellor.

	a	b	c	d	e	f	g	h	i	j
10	a10 black rook	b10	c10	d10	e10	f10	g10	h10	i10	j10 black rook	10
9	a9	b9 black knight	c9 black bishop	d9 black queen	e9 black king	f9 black empress	g9 black princess	h9 black bishop	i9 black knight	j9	9
8	a8 black pawn	b8 black pawn	c8 black pawn	d8 black pawn	e8 black pawn	f8 black pawn	g8 black pawn	h8 black pawn	i8 black pawn	j8 black pawn	8
7	a7	b7	c7	d7	e7	f7	g7	h7	i7	j7	7
6	a6	b6	c6	d6	e6	f6	g6	h6	i6	j6	6
5	a5	b5	c5	d5	e5	f5	g5	h5	i5	j5	5
4	a4	b4	c4	d4	e4	f4	g4	h4	i4	j4	4
3	a3 white pawn	b3 white pawn	c3 white pawn	d3 white pawn	e3 white pawn	f3 white pawn	g3 white pawn	h3 white pawn	i3 white pawn	j3 white pawn	3
2	a2	b2 white knight	c2 white bishop	d2 white queen	e2 white king	f2 white empress	g2 white princess	h2 white bishop	i2 white knight	j2	2
1	a1 white rook	b1	c1	d1	e1	f1	g1	h1	i1	j1 white rook	1
	a	b	c	d	e	f	g	h	i	j

Grand Chess by Christian Freeling
- Capablanca Chess (or Knighted chess): A variant by the former world chess champion, José Raúl Capablanca. Played on a 10×8 board with chancellor (empress) and archbishop (princess).
- Capablanca Random Chess: Generalises Capablanca Chess with random starting positions, following a method similar to that used in Chess960. By Reinhard Scharnagl (2004).
- Embassy Chess: Uses a 10×8 board with Marshall (Empress) and Cardinal (Princess). The starting position is borrowed from Grand Chess. By Kevin Hill (2005).
- Gothic chess: A commercial variant played on a 10×8 board with Chancellor (Empress) and Archbishop (Princess).
- Grand Chess: Uses a 10×10 board with marshall (empress) and cardinal (princess). Invented by Christian Freeling (1984).
- Janus Chess: Uses a 10×8 board with two januses (princesses). By Werner Schöndorf (1978).
- Maharajah and the Sepoys: Black has a complete army, and White only one piece: the maharajah (a royal amazon).
- Modern Chess: Played on a 9×9 board, with an extra pawn and a prime minister (princess). By Gabriel Vicente Maura (1968).
- Musketeer chess: A commercial variant, inspired from Seirawan Chess. This variant introduces 10 fairy pieces: archbishop, chancellor, hawk (different rules from Seirawan Chess), elephant (different rules from Seirawan Chess), leopard, cannon (different from Xiangqi), unicorn, fortress, spider, and amazon (also called dragon in this game). Players have a choice of 2 pieces among the 10 possible and method used to introduce them during the game.
- Seirawan Chess: A commercial variant. Uses a standard 8×8 board with elephant (empress) and hawk (princess). By GM Yasser Seirawan and Bruce Harper (2007).

==== Other variants with fairy pieces ====
- 2000 A.D.: Played on a 10×10 board, features the empress, capricorn, gorgon, chimaera, dragon, minotaur, unicorn, and fury fairy chess pieces. By V. R. Parton.
- Bear chess: A 10x10 chess variant, proposed by Mikhail Sosnovsky in 1985 in Kalinin (now Tver). The extra pieces are Bears, which leap as N or two squares as R or B; baseline (a1-j1/a10-j10) RNBBeQKBeBNR. Pawns can move up to three squares initially (e.p. permitted). In castling, K moves to c/h files.
- Chessers: There are multiple variants that combine the rules of chess and checkers, including a 1925 variant by Frank Maus, and a 1960 proprietary variant by Phillips Publishers, Inc.
- Chess on a really big board or Chess on four boards: Played on a 16x16 board with 6 nonstandard piece types. Invented by Ralph Betza.
- Dragonchess: Three 8x12 boards with some standard chess pieces and many other pieces, some of which move between the levels. Created by Gary Gygax.
- Duell: Dice are used instead of pieces. Played on a 9×8 board.
- Etchessera: Played on a regular chessboard but where players build their own chess army from a collection of 17 different pieces.
- Gess: Chess with variable pieces, played on the squares of a Go board.
- Proteus: A chess variant using dice to represent normal chess pieces, created by Steve Jackson Games.
- Shako: Played on a 10×10 board. New pieces are the cannon from xiangqi (Chinese chess) and an elephant moving as a fers+alfil of old shatranj (ancestors of queen and bishop), so diagonally one or two squares with jumps allowed. By Jean-Louis Cazaux (1997).
- Stratomic: Adds nuclear missiles to the standard chess array on a 10×10 board. When launched they irradiate any 3×3 area (friendly pieces included) except kings. By Robert Montay-Marsais (1972).
- Wildebeest Chess: Uses an 11×10 board, each player has two camels and a wildebeest (camel + knight). Pawns move one, two, or three squares initially. By R. Wayne Schmittberger (1987).
- Wolf Chess: On an 8×10 board, with fairy pieces wolf (empress), fox (princess), nightrider, sergeant (almost a Berolina pawn), and elephant (amazon). By Arno von Wilpert (1943).

=== Variant rules ===
These variants introduce changes in the mechanics of the game, such as movement of pieces, rules for capturing, or winning conditions.

==== Variant move counts ====
In these variants one or both players can move more than once per turn. The board and the pieces in these variants are the same as in standard chess.

- Avalanche chess: Each move consists of a standard chess move followed by a move of one of the opponent's pawns. By Ralph Betza (1977).
- Double-Move Chess: Similar to Marseillais chess, but with no en passant, check, or checkmate. The objective is to capture the king. By Fred Galvin (1957).
- Kung-fu chess: A variant without turns. Any player can move any of their pieces at any given moment. It won an award in the 2002 Independent Games Festival.
- Marseillais chess (or Two-move chess): After the first turn of the game by White being a single move, each player moves twice per turn.
- Monster chess (or Super King): White has the king and four pawns (c2-f2) against the entire black army but may make two successive moves per turn. There is no check. Players win by capturing the king. In a variant, White's pieces begin one row forward of their usual starting position, and the White's pawns may not begin with a double step. Another variant denies Black promotion rights (pawns reaching the last rank remain as pawns). White may always promote.
- Multimove Chess (i, j) [multivariant]: A class of chess variants where white gets i moves per turn and black gets j moves per turn. Check is not enforced, and victory is by capturing the enemy king. The games are described and analysed logically in a 2015 journal article. The authors weakly solved the game for all (i, j) pairs except for (1, 1) (which is, functionally, regular chess) and (2, 2).
- Progressive chess: White moves once, then Black moves twice, then White moves three times, and so on. There are Italian and Scottish sub-variants.
- Swarm chess: During each turn, each piece that a player can move must be moved.

==== Other variant midgame rules ====
These variants feature variant rules in the middle of the game, but the end goal remains the same (to checkmate the enemy king).

- Absorption chess (or cannibal chess or power absorption chess or seizer's chess): Pieces gain the abilities of the pieces they capture.
- Andernach chess: A piece making a capture changes colour.
- Atomic chess: Capture on any square results in an "atomic explosion" which kills (i.e. removes from the game) all pieces in the eight surrounding squares, except for pawns.
- Benedict chess: Instead of capturing by displacement, players may convert an enemy piece they attack to their own color.

	a	b	c	d	e	f	g	h	i	j	k	l
12	a12	b12	c12	d12	e12	f12	g12	h12	i12	j12	k12	l12	12
11	a11	b11	c11	d11	e11	f11	g11	h11	i11	j11	k11	l11	11
10	a10	b10	c10	d10	e10	f10	g10	h10	i10	j10	k10	l10	10
9	a9	b9	c9	d9	e9	f9	g9	h9	i9	j9	k9	l9	9
8	a8	b8	c8	d8	e8	f8	g8	h8	i8	j8	k8	l8	8
7	a7	b7	c7	d7	e7	f7	g7	h7	i7	j7	k7	l7	7
6	a6	b6	c6	d6	e6	f6	g6	h6	i6	j6	k6	l6	6
5	a5	b5	c5	d5	e5	f5	g5	h5	i5	j5	k5	l5	5
4	a4	b4	c4	d4	e4	f4	g4	h4	i4	j4	k4	l4	4
3	a3	b3	c3	d3	e3	f3	g3	h3	i13	j3	k3	l3	3
2	a2	b2	c2	d2	e2	f2	g2	h2	i2	j2	k2	l2	2
1	a1	b1	c1	d1	e1	f1	g1	h1	i1	j1	k1	l1	1
	a	b	c	d	e	f	g	h	i	j	k	l

Chad by Christian Freeling
- Chad: Kings are limited to 3×3 "castles" on a 12×12 board dominated by eight rooks per side which can promote to queens. By Christian Freeling (1979).
- Checkers chess: Pieces can only move forward until they have reached the far rank.
- Checkless chess: Players are forbidden from giving check except to checkmate.
- Chessplus: Commercial variant. Up to two of any friendly pieces (except the king) may occupy the same single square. Either piece may choose to carry the other with it if or when it moves.
- Circe chess: Captured pieces are reborn on their starting squares.
- Congo: Kings (lions) are limited to 3×3 "castles" on a 7×7 board. By Demian Freeling (1982).
- Crazyhouse: Captured pieces change color to match the capturing player's pieces and can be returned to any unoccupied square on a later turn. There are two variations of this variant, known as Loop Chess and Chessgi.
- Cubic Chess: Piece cubes display the six piece types. Instead of moving a piece, a player may promote any pawn by rotating its cube to match a captured piece type. By Vladimír Pribylinec (1977). (There is another variant with the same name by V. R. Parton that uses a 6x6x6 board.)
- Dragonfly: Played on a 7×7 or with a hexagonal board, no queens, captured non-pawn pieces never die (à la Chessgi) and can be dropped on any open square. By Christian Freeling.
- Dynamo Chess: Capturing is replaced by pushing or pulling enemy pieces off the board. By Hans Klüver and Peter Kahl (1968). A close variant of Push Chess (by Fred Galvin, 1967).
- Einstein chess: Pieces transform into more or less powerful pieces when they move.
- Gravity chess: After every turn, all pieces other than pawns fall towards the higher ranks of the board, until they either reach the eighth rank, or another piece or pawn in the way.
- Grid chess: The board is overlaid with a grid of lines. For a move to be legal, it must cross at least one of these lines.
- Guard chess (or Icelandic chess): Allows captures only when a piece is completely unprotected by friendly pieces. Checkmate occurs when the piece forcing the mate is protected and therefore cannot be captured.
- Haft Schrödinger Chess: Every piece starts in a quantum superposition initially able to be any piece until the waveform is collapsed by observation. As in chess, Haft Schrödinger Chess does not have hidden information, whereas Schrödinger's Chess is regarded as a game of hidden information. A digital implementation of the game exists called Entanglement Chess.
- Hierarchical chess: Pieces must be moved in the order: pawn, knight, bishop, rook, queen, king. A player who has the corresponding piece but cannot move it loses.
- Hostage chess: Captured pieces are held in the capturer's "prison", and can be released by the opponent and dropped into play (like shogi) via a "hostage exchange". By John Leslie (1997).

Position: a8 black rook, d8 black queen, f8 black rook, g8 black king, a7 black pawn, e7 black bishop, f7 white knight, g7 black pawn, h7 black pawn, b6 black pawn, e6 white bishop, f6 black knight, c5 black pawn, a2 white pawn, b2 white pawn, c2 white pawn, f2 white pawn, g2 white pawn, h2 white pawn, a1 white rook, e1 white rook, g1 white king

Jump Chess example checkmate
- Jump chess: The rook, bishop and queen may move from one side of any piece (friend or foe) to the other side in their normal direction of movement. No change for the King and Knight. Jump move is exactly two squares, and can be used to give check or to capture. Jump moves are notated using '^'. In the starting position, 1.R^a3 and 1.B^a3 are both legal. By former Pentamind champion Alain Dekker (2008).
- Kamikaze chess (or Hara-Kiri chess): When capturing, the capturing piece is removed from play also. This means a king cannot defend itself by capturing an attacker. A capture is not allowed if it exposes one's own king to discovered check. Idea from B. G. Laws (1928). The king is royal and removing a check takes precedence over capturing. The king must be lost last; moving into check is permitted after all other pieces have been captured.
- Knight relay chess: Pieces defended by a friendly knight can move as a knight.
- Legan chess: Played as if the board would be rotated 45°, initial position and pawn movements are adjusted accordingly.
- Madrasi chess (or Weird chess): A piece which is attacked by the same type of piece of the opposite color is paralysed.
- Monochromatic chess (or Mono-Chess): All pieces must stay on the same color square as they initially begin. Knights have a double leap.
- No Castling Chess: standard rules except that castling is not allowed, which means king safety is reduced. Proposed in 2019 by Vladimir Kramnik with the aim of reducing draws and uninteresting games, and tested on Alpha Zero.
- Patrol chess: Captures and checks are only possible if the capturing or checking piece is guarded by a friendly piece.
- PlunderChess: The capturing piece is allowed to temporarily take the moving abilities of the piece taken.
- Pocket Knight Chess (or Tombola Chess): Players have an extra knight they keep at the side of the board. Once during the game, a player may place the knight on any empty square for their move. Play then proceeds as normal.
- Refusal chess (or Outlaw chess, Rejection chess): A played move can be refused by the opponent, forcing the first player to change to another move, which must be accepted.
- Replacement chess (or Bhagavathi Chess, Canadian Chess, Madhouse Chess, or Repeating Chess): Captured pieces are not removed from the board but relocated by the captor to any vacant square.
- Rifle chess (or Shooting chess, Sniper chess): When capturing, the capturing piece remains unmoved on its original square, instead of occupying the square of the piece captured.
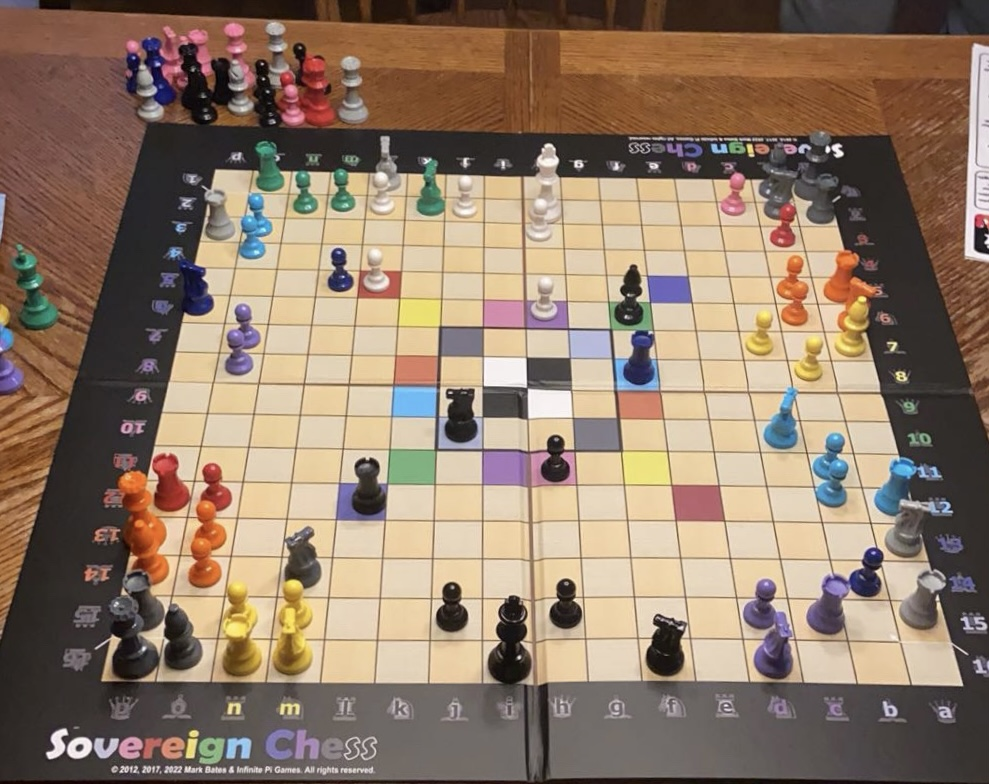
- Late stage of Sovereign Chess game
  Sovereign Chess: This variant is played on a 16×16 board. In addition to the standard black and white pieces, the board is also encircled by 80 other coloured pieces (10 colours of 8 pieces each). Coloured squares near the center of the board correspond to the coloured pieces around the board, and when a player's piece occupies a coloured square, that player gains control of the matching coloured pieces. If a piece on a coloured square is moved or captured, control of the matching pieces is lost (transferred to the other player in case of capture). Players may also switch the color of their initial army through "regime change". By Mark Bates.

==== Variant end-of-game rules ====
Position: a8 black rook, b8 black knight, c8 black bishop, d8 black queen, e8 black king, f8 black bishop, g8 black knight, h8 black rook, a7 black pawn, b7 black pawn, c7 black pawn, d7 black pawn, e7 black pawn, f7 black pawn, g7 black pawn, h7 black pawn, d6 white upside-down king, d3 black upside-down king, a2 white pawn, b2 white pawn, c2 white pawn, d2 white pawn, e2 white pawn, f2 white pawn, g2 white pawn, h2 white pawn, a1 white rook, b1 white knight, c1 white bishop, d1 white queen, e1 white king, f1 white bishop, g1 white knight, h1 white rook

Anti-king chess. The anti-king is shown as an inverted king. White's anti-king starts on d6, while Black's anti-king starts on d3.
- Anti-King chess: Features an anti-king. The anti-king moves in the same way as a king. This piece is in check when not attacked. If a player's anti-king is in check and unable to move to a square attacked by the opponent, the player loses (checkmate). The anti-king cannot capture enemy pieces, but can capture friendly pieces. A king may not attack the opponent's anti-king. The anti-king may not check its own king. (That is, a position when a king and an anti-king are on adjacent squares is possible, does not mean any check and does not help the anti-king to avoid check if any other piece does not attack him.) Other rules are the same as in standard chess, including check and checkmate to the regular king. By Peter Aronson (2002). (Two setups were suggested by the inventor initially, but only the second one, Anti-King II, which is very close to standard chess, gained popularity.)
- Apocalypse: On a 5×5 board, each side has two knights and five pawns, win by eliminating all enemy pawns. Prepared moves are executed simultaneously. By C. S. Elliott (1976).
- Colour Chess: Played on a multicoloured board of six colours, with the order of turns taken as in Marseillais chess but with rules indicating which colour each piece may move to. The game is won by capturing the opponent's king (rather than checkmate) and kings may remain in check. Similar variants include Sequence Colour Chess, and Swarm Colour Chess. By Tom Norfolk (2017).
- Duck Chess: In addition to the usual pieces, the two players have joint control of a small rubber duck which acts as a "blocker" (i.e. nothing can move onto or through it), and which must be moved to a new square after every turn. The goal is to successfully capture the opponent's king. A stalemated player wins.
- Extinction chess: To win, a player must capture all of any one type of pieces of the opponent (for example, all the knights an opponent has, or all their pawns, etc.).
- Hexapawn [multivariant, parameterized by the dimensions of the board]: Played on a rectangular board of variable size with only pawns. The goal of each player is to advance one of their pawns to the opposite end of the board or to prevent the other player from moving. By Martin Gardner (1962).

	a	b	c	d	e	f	g	h	i
9	a9 black knight	b9 black knight	c9 black knight	d9 black knight	e9 black knight	f9 black knight	g9 black knight	h9 black knight	i9 black knight	9
8	a8	b8	c8	d8	e8	f8	g8	h8	i8	8
7	a7	b7	c7	d7	e7	f7	g7	h7	i7	7
6	a6	b6	c6	d6	e6	f6	g6	h6	i6	6
5	a5	b5	c5	d5	e5 white cross	f5	g5	h5	i5	5
4	a4	b4	c4	d4	e4	f4	g4	h4	i4	4
3	a3	b3	c3	d3	e3	f3	g3	h3	i3	3
2	a2	b2	c2	d2	e2	f2	g2	h2	i2	2
1	a1 white knight	b1 white knight	c1 white knight	d1 white knight	e1 white knight	f1 white knight	g1 white knight	h1 white knight	i1 white knight	1
	a	b	c	d	e	f	g	h	i

Jeson Mor gameboard and starting setup
- Jesön Mor (meaning "Nine Horses"): Nine knights per side on a 9×9 board. The first to occupy square e5, and then leave it, wins the game. From Mongolia.
- King of the Hill: In addition to checkmate, any legal move that moves one's own king to one of the center squares (d4, d5, e4, or e5) automatically wins the game. This is analogous to Sannin shogi's rule that allows a player to win by legally moving their king to the center.

Position: a8 black rook, b8 black upside-down king, c8 black bishop, d8 black queen, e8 C d, f8 black bishop, g8 black upside-down king, h8 black rook, a7 black pawn, b7 black pawn, c7 black pawn, d7 black pawn, e7 black pawn, f7 black pawn, g7 black pawn, h7 black pawn, a2 white pawn, b2 white pawn, c2 white pawn, d2 white pawn, e2 white pawn, f2 white pawn, g2 white pawn, h2 white pawn, a1 white rook, b1 white upside-down king, c1 white bishop, d1 white queen, e1 C e, f1 white bishop, g1 white upside-down king, h1 white rook

Knightmate starting position
- Knightmate (or Mate The Knight): The goal is to checkmate the opponent's knight (initially on e-file). The kings on b- and g-files can be captured as other pieces. Pawns can promote to kings but not to knights. By Bruce Zimov (1972).
- Losing chess (or Antichess, Giveaway chess, Suicide chess, Killer chess, Take-all chess, Take-me chess, Reverse chess): Capturing moves are mandatory and the objective is to lose all one's pieces. There is no check; the king is captured like an ordinary piece.
- Passant: In this single-player roguelike video game, the player has victory conditions (such as checkmate, checking multiple turns in a row, destroying all non-king pieces, or score requirements) of which only one needs to be accomplished to win a round. Similar to Balatro, the player can purchase pieces in a shop and must continually clear boss rounds.

Position: a2 black king, b2 black rook, c2 black bishop, d2 black knight, e2 white knight, f2 white bishop, g2 white rook, h2 white king, a1 black queen, b1 black rook, c1 black bishop, d1 black knight, e1 white knight, f1 white bishop, g1 white rook, h1 white queen

Racing Kings: first king to 8th rank wins
- Racing Kings: Players race kings to the 8th rank. Captures, but no checks or checkmate.
- Three-check chess: Takes the "three strikes, you're out" rule from baseball and applies it to chess; standard rules of chess apply, but a player can alternatively win by putting their opponent in check three times. In The Encyclopedia of Chess Variants, David Pritchard notes it being of probable Soviet origin, and that Anatoly Karpov was an "invincible" player in his youth.

=== Non-rectangular board ===
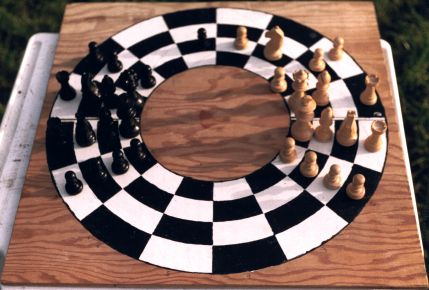
Circular chess

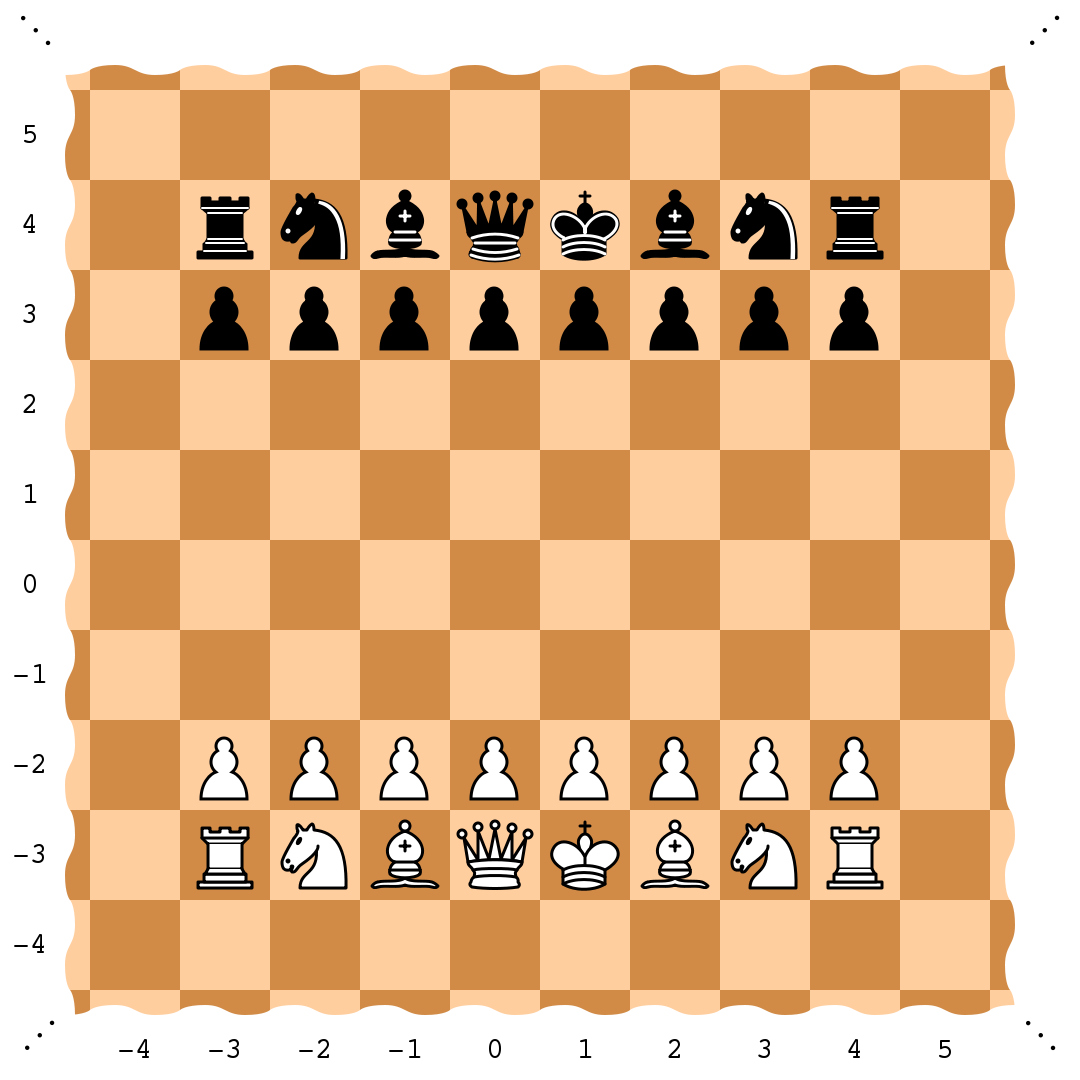
Infinite chess. One example with pieces in their standard positions.

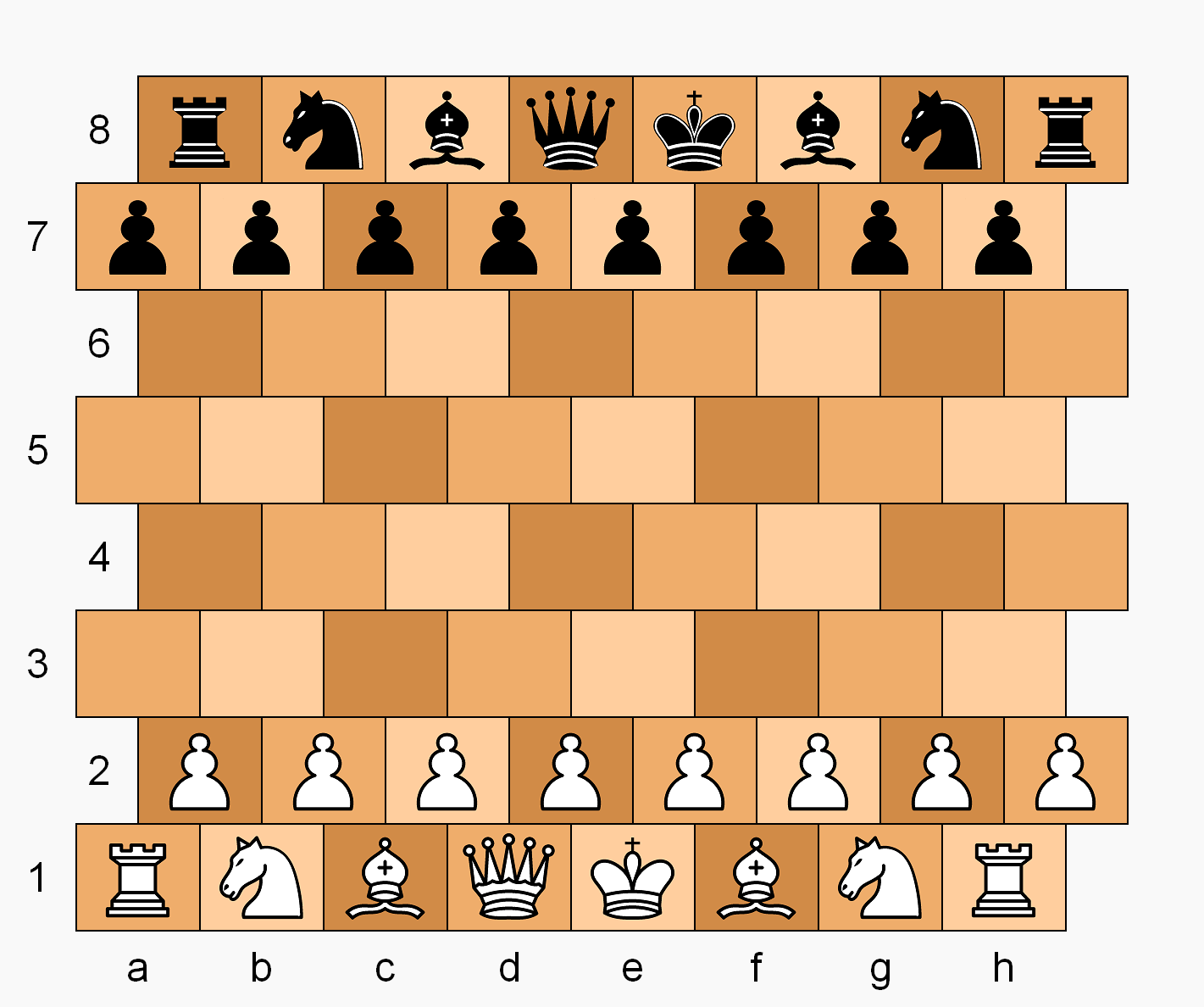
Masonic Chess by George Dekle Sr.

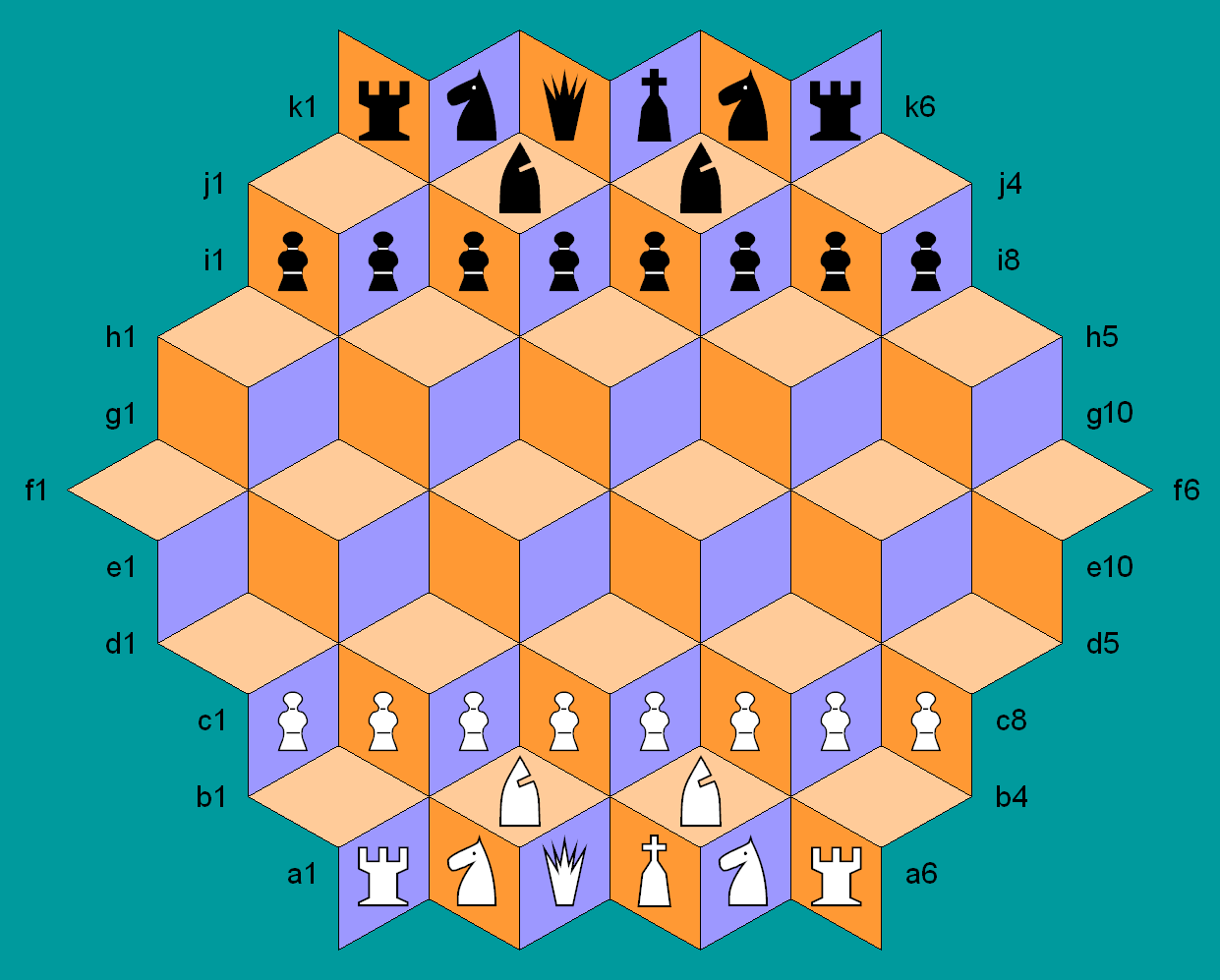
Rhombic Chess by Tony Paletta

In this category, the movement of pieces can be modified in concurrence with the geometry of the board.

==== Hexagonal spaces ====
- Baskerville's hexagonal chess: Earliest attempt at a strict hexagonal analog to chess. 83 cell hex board with four corners. Same as Gliński's Hexagonal Chess, but no special pawn moves or hex diagonal king moves. Opposing bishops occupy differently colored spaces, thus preventing them from attacking each other. By H. D. Baskerville (1929).
- Brusky's hexagonal chess: Chess on an irregular board of 84 hex cells. Same as Gliński's Hexagonal Chess, but with ten pawns instead of nine, linear startup, two forward move directions for pawns, pawns capture forward diagonally, and castling. By Yakov Brusky (1966).
- De Vasa's hexagonal chess: Chess on a rhombus-shaped board of 81 hex cells. Same as Gliński's Hexagonal Chess, but linear startup, two forward move directions for pawns, pawns capture forward diagonally to the side, and castling. Invented by Helge E. de Vasa (1953).
- Gliński's hexagonal chess: The most popular version of chess for the hex board. Includes three bishops, nine pawns, 91 hex cells. Invented by Władysław Gliński (1936).
- McCooey's hexagonal chess: Chess on the same hexagonal board as Gliński's Hexagonal Chess, but using a different starting array, seven pawns instead of nine, and pawns capture forward diagonally. By Richard Honeycutt and David McCooey (1978–1979).
- Polgar Superstar Chess: Hexagonal variant played on a special star-shaped board. Invented by László Polgár (2002).
- Shafran's hexagonal chess: Chess on an irregular hex board of 70 cells. Same as Gliński's Hexagonal Chess, but differs by starting position, pawn first-move options, pawns capturing forward diagonally, and castling. Invented by Grigorevich Shafran (1939).
- Strozewski's hexagonal chess: Chess on a square-shaped board of 81 hex cells. King and Knight move as if cells were squares. Invented by Casimir S. Strozewski (1976).
- Troy: A variant inspired by the Trojan War played on a 91-cell hexagonal board. Pieces are named after characters from the myth.

==== Triangular spaces ====
- Triangular Chess: Board comprises 96 triangles. The rook and bishop have three directions; the queen, six. Three extra pawns and a unicorn. By George Dekle Sr.

==== Other 2D layouts ====
- Balbo's Game: A novel-shaped board with 70 squares. Full armies for each player, minus one pawn. No castling. By G. Balbo (1974).
- Chessence: Nine pieces per player move according to their relative positions to each other on a 6×9 board with missing squares and kings immobile in the corners. By Jim Winslow (1989).
- Circular chess: Played on a circular board consisting of four rings, each of sixteen squares.
- Cross chess: Cross-shaped cells, board geometry like hex chess but moves akin to normal chess (e.g. bishops have four directions, not six; queens eight, not twelve). Extra rook, knight, and pawn per side. By George Dekle Sr.
- Cylinder chess: Played on a cylinder board with a- and h-files "connected". Thus a player can use them as if the a-file were next to the h-file (and vice versa).
- Infinite chess: Numerous players and mathematicians have conceived of chess variations played on an unbounded chessboard. In one example, when using "Converse's rules," the pieces and their relative starting positions are unchanged—only the board is infinitely large.
- Masonic Chess: Every other board rank is indented. Same as standard chess, with moves adapted to the new brickwork-like board. By George Dekle Sr.
- Morley's chess: Augmentation of the board with two "corridors" alongside the rook files, running from second to seventh rank; a board totaling 76 squares.
- Omega chess: On a 10×10 board with four extra squares, one per corner. Includes the champion and wizard fairy pieces. Both are leapers, with different ways of leaping.
- Rhombic Chess: Uses a hex-shaped board comprising 72 rhombus cells. Normal set of chess pieces move edgewise or pointwise. Checkmate objective as usual. By Tony Paletta (1980).
- Rollerball: Inspired by the sci-fi film of the same name, pieces move clockwise around a Roller Derby-like track. By Jean-Louis Cazaux (1998).
- Spherical chess [multivariant]: A family of variants played on a chessboard wrapped around a sphere. The a- and h-files are adjacent. The poles are circular or octagonal and may or may not be occupied according to the variant. There are no board edges, so kings always have eight adjacent squares. Trans-polar diagonal moves mostly differentiate between variants.
- Zonal chess: Board has triangular wings or "zones" on either side of the main 8×8 board. Queens, bishops, and rooks that start from one of the squares in either zone may change direction and keep going on the same move. A queen, for example, could zig around an obstruction and attack a piece in the opposite zone. The power to change direction only applies when a piece's move starts from a zonal area. It is possible (using the queen and rook) to cross the board from one zone to another, but any piece entering a zone cannot make use of the extended move.

==== Higher-dimensional boards ====
a8	b8	c8	d8	e8	f8	g8	h8
a7	b7	c7	d7	e7	f7	g7	h7
a6	b6	c6	d6	e6	f6	g6	h6
a5	b5	c5	d5	e5	f5	g5	h5
a4	b4	c4	d4	e4	f4	g4	h4
a3	b3	c3	d3	e3	f3	g3	h3
a2	b2	c2	d2	e2	f2	g2	h2
a1	b1	c1	d1	e1	f1	g1	h1

1

a8	b8	c8	d8	e8	f8	g8	h8
a7	b7	c7	d7	e7	f7	g7	h7
a6	b6	c6	d6	e6	f6	g6	h6
a5	b5	c5	d5	e5	f5	g5	h5
a4	b4	c4	d4	e4	f4	g4	h4
a3	b3	c3	d3	e3	f3	g3	h3
a2	b2	c2	d2	e2	f2	g2	h2
a1	b1	c1	d1	e1	f1	g1	h1

2

a8	b8	c8	d8	e8	f8	g8	h8
a7	b7	c7	d7	e7	f7	g7	h7
a6	b6	c6	d6	e6	f6	g6	h6
a5	b5	c5	d5	e5	f5	g5	h5
a4	b4	c4	d4	e4	f4	g4	h4
a3	b3	c3	d3	e3	f3	g3	h3
a2	b2	c2	d2	e2	f2	g2	h2
a1	b1	c1	d1	e1	f1	g1	h1

3

A number of variants have been developed where the playing area is in three dimensions or more. In most cases an extra spatial dimension is represented by multiple boards being laid next to each other. Some extra-dimensional variants attempt to reflect the 3D nature of modern warfare (e.g. Raumschach, designed to reflect aerial and submarine warfare), while others incorporate fantasy or science fiction ideas such as parallel worlds and time travel. An example of the latter is the variant introduced by the 2020 computer game 5D Chess with Multiverse Time Travel, which uses a varying number of boards all being played in parallel.

- 5D Chess with Multiverse Time Travel: Players can move their pieces through time and between timelines, interacting with the board as it existed earlier in the game, creating alternate timelines which pieces can be moved between. The game is won if at least one king from any time and timeline is in checkmate.
- Flying chess: Played on a board of 8×8×2, giving a total of 128 cells. Only certain pieces can move to and from the additional level.
- Parallel Worlds Chess: A 3D variant using three boards. Each player commands two armies. Capturing either enemy king wins. The middle board has its own movement rules. By R. Wayne Schmittberger (1980s).
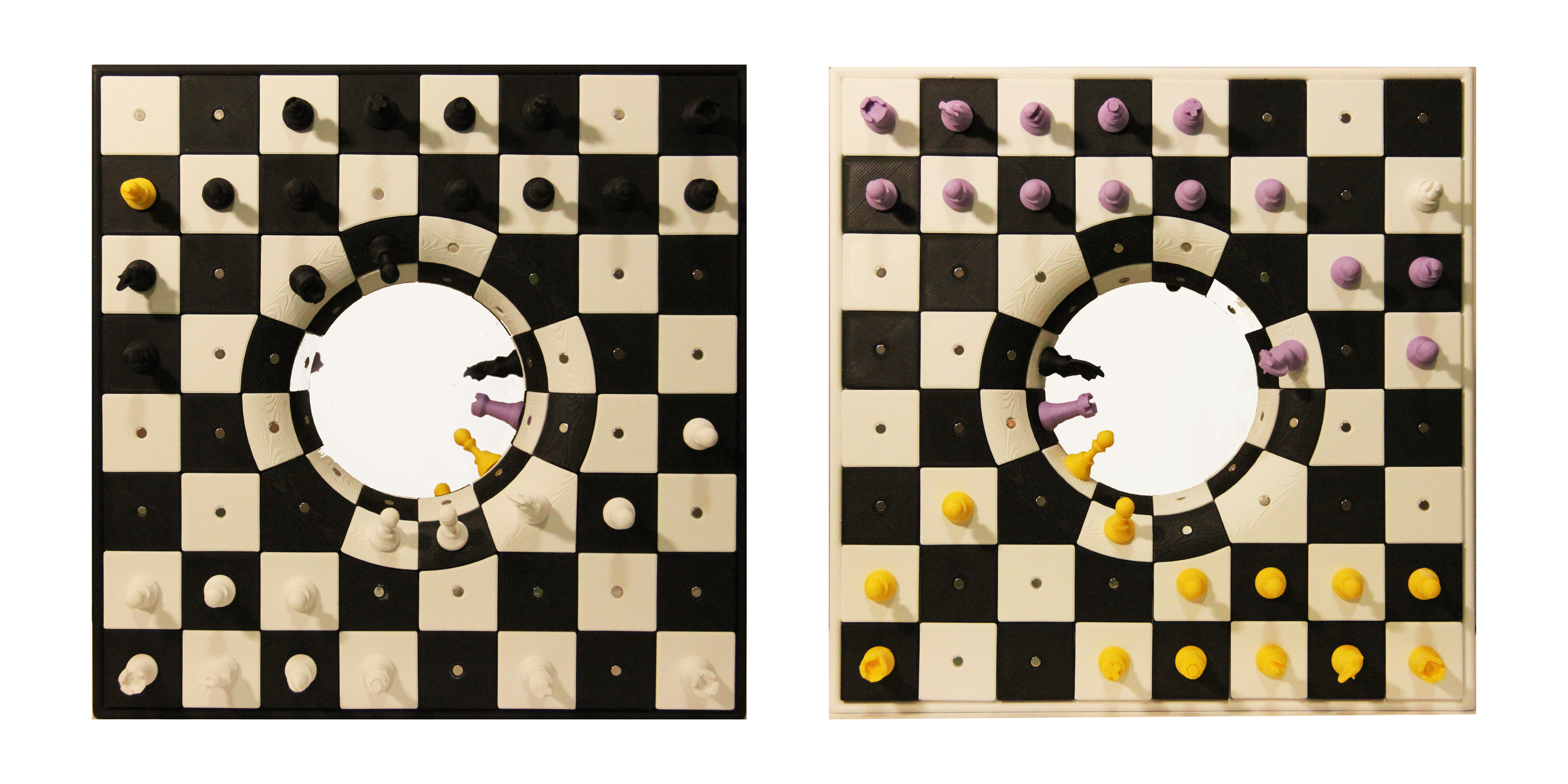
  In-progress four-person game of Wormhole Chess
- Wormhole Chess: Played with two boards connected through a "wormhole". The boards include pentagonal spaces along the entryway to the wormhole that allow for atypical movement. Pieces stay attached to the board with magnets.

==== Multiple boards ====
- Alice Chess: Played with two boards, called A and B. All pieces start in the standard locations on board A. Each piece moved on one board passes "through the looking glass" onto the other. "Null moves" are allowed, which move a piece from one board to the corresponding space on the other. By V. R. Parton (1953).
- Chesquerque: Played on four Alquerque boards combined. Includes an extra pawn and archbishop per side. By George Dekle Sr.
- Regimental Chess: This variant is played on 1-6 adjacent 12×16 boards, with one white and black division for each board signified by accent colours. Each division starts with 14 infantrymen, similar to pawns but only moving one space at a time straight or diagonally forward until promoted to move one space in any direction, four bishops, four knights, four rooks, two queens and one king, and players may place their pieces into their own formation before the game starts. When a division's king is captured, all other pieces from that division are removed from the battlefield. Pieces can move together as formations, which are connected by any compatible pieces that are adjacent or mutually supportive with one another, and capture pieces by broadsiding with walls of pieces or piercing inferior ranks with superior firepower. Pieces are mutually supportive if they are identical and are within reach of their move style; for example, two bishops are mutually supportive if they are on an adjacent diagonal path unobstructed by other pieces.

=== Variant player count ===
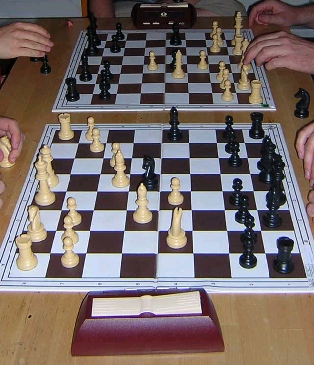
Bughouse chess, the game in progress

- Bosworth: A commercial variant played by two or four players on 6×6 board. It uses a special card system with the pieces for spawning.
- Bughouse chess (or Exchange chess, Siamese chess, Swap chess, Tandem chess, Transfer Chess): Two teams of two players face each other on two boards. Allies use opposite colours and give captured pieces to their partner. Derived from an earlier two-player variant called Crazyhouse that is played on only one board.
- Business chess [multivariant]: Played with two teams using normal chess playing rules but allowing up to five variations of the game. The team may discuss and play alternative moves freely.
- Djambi: Can be played by four players on a 9×9 board and four sets of special pieces. Pieces can capture or move those of an adversary. Captured pieces are not removed from the board, but turned upside down. There are variants for three or five players (Pentachiavel). (1975)
- Duchess: Notable for its wide variety of player counts; supports 2, 3, 4, or 6 players in a free-for-all, as well as 2v2, 2v2v2, or 3v3 team play. The board consists of one 4×5 "petal" for each player. These surround a core hexagonal board, which itself has two rings of squares around a central hexagonal "vortex" space. Three Fairy Chess pieces are used, the titular Duchess (princess), the Fortress (empress), and the Wizard, capable of teleporting friendly pieces.
- Enochian chess: A four-player variant with magical symbolism, associated with the Hermetic Order of the Golden Dawn.
- Forchess: A four-player variant using the standard board and two sets of standard pieces.
- Fortress chess: A four-player variant played in Russia in 18th and 19th centuries played on a 12x12 board with the four 2x2 corners replaced by 4x4 regions, causing the resulting 192-square board to resemble a fortress.
- Four Fronts (or Ajedrez Uruguayo [Uruguayan Chess] or Cuatro Frentes [Four Fronts]): A variant for 2, 3, or 4 players on a board with 144 squares arranged in a diamond pattern. It was created in 2012 by a Uruguayan professor named Gabriel Baldi Lemonnier.
- Four-player chess (or Four-handed, 4-Player): Can be played by four people and uses a special board and two sets of differently coloured pieces. Two modes includes: Teams or Free For All.
- Hand and brain: Teams of two play against each other; in each team, one player is the "brain" and calls out a piece type, while the "hand" player chooses which piece of that type to move and where to move it.
- Quatrochess: A four-player variant, in addition to the standard chess army, each side controls a chancellor, archbishop, mann, wazir, fers, two camels, and two giraffes. By George Dekle Sr.
- Superchess: 4-player chess game published in 1992 by Green Island games.
- Three-Man Chess: Three chessboard halves fused into one, first to checkmate wins. By George Dekle Sr.
- Tri-Chess: A 3-player variant, played on a board with 150 triangular cells. The rooks and bishops each move in 6 directions, while the queens move in 12 directions. By George Dekle Sr.

=== Variants with hidden information or use of chance ===
In contrast to standard chess, which is a game of complete information, in these variants, the players do not have perfect information about the state of the board, or there is an element of chance in how the game is played after the initial setup of pieces.

- Beirut Chess: Each player secretly equips one of their pieces with a "bomb" that can be detonated at any time, wiping out all pieces on adjacent squares. Win by checkmating the opponent, or blowing up their king. By Jim Winslow (1992).
- ChessHeads: Played with cards that change the game rules.
- Dark chess (or Fog of War chess): The player sees only squares of the board that are attacked by their pieces.
- Dice chess [multivariant]: The pieces a player is able to move are determined by rolling a pair of dice.
- Fantasy Chess: Chess with wargaming added. Players fight for squares (which can be co-occupied) using dice. Can be expanded to four players; piece capability can improve each game.
- Knightmare Chess: Commercial variant played with cards that change the game rules, based on the French game Tempête sur l'échiquier ("Storm on the Chessboard"). Published by Steve Jackson Games in 1996, with an expansion deck called Knightmare Chess 2 published in 1997.
- Kriegspiel (or Kriegsspiel): Neither player knows where the opponent's pieces are but can deduce them with information from a referee. This variant has been used in military training to simulate the "fog of war".
- Panic Chess: Player selects a piece to move, but the target square is randomized from all possible options. Captures are prioritized over non-capture moves. King, if no capture is possible, prioritizes a square not attacked by the opponent. Play ends with capture of king.
- Playing cards on a chessboard: A card game allowing open play on a board with rectangular sectors, just as in chess or checkers, but with the application of playing cards.
- Pokémon Chess: Each player assigns a type from Pokémon to each of their pieces before the game starts. A capture on a piece depends on the type of the attacking piece and defending piece: If the attacking piece's type is super-effective towards the defending piece, the attacking piece gets to move again. If the attack is not very effective, both pieces will die, and if the defender is immune, the move is skipped. Additionally, on every capture, there is a chance of hitting a critical hit or missing, which makes the attacker go again or have their move skipped respectively. A player wins when they capture their opponent's king; there is no check.
- Quantum Chess: Instead of a making a standard move, a player can make a "quantum move", which splits the piece being moved into a "superposition" of two locations, each with their own "probability". (Pawns cannot make quantum moves.) A succession of quantum moves can result in a piece being split into several superpositions. When that piece interacts with another piece, a measurement occurs, which causes the superpositions formed by the most recent quantum move in the history of that piece to be consolidated into a single location. The location of that consolidation depends randomly on the probabilities of the different superpositions. Playing the game by hand would require complex mathematical computations and a means of random number generation. There is a computer implementation available on the computer game platform Steam, and an online implementation.
- Synchronous Chess: Players try to outguess each other, moving simultaneously after privately recording intended moves and anticipated results. Incompatible moves, for instance to the same square with no anticipated capture, are replayed. Alternatively, two pieces moving to the same square are both captured, unless one is the king, in which case it captures the other. Play ends with capture of king.
- Viennese Chess: A barrier or screen between the two halves of the chessboard, two players then place their pieces on their half of the board. The barrier is then lifted and the game is then played as in standard chess.

== Games inspired by chess ==
These variants are very different from chess and may be classified as abstract strategy board games instead of chess variants.

- Arimaa: A game designed in 2002 to be easy for people to understand but difficult for computers to play well. The Arimaa Challenge was a cash prize offered for developing a program able to defeat the top human Arimaa players; this was claimed in 2015.
- Feudal: A commercial war game for 2-6 players, originally published in 1967, with pieces that move and capture like chess pieces, but where any number of a player's pieces may be moved during their turn, and with a board featuring terrain and obstacles.
- Hive: A bug-themed, commercial abstract strategy game designed by John Yianni and published in 2001 by Gen42 Games. The object of Hive is to capture the opponent's queen bee by completely surrounding it, while avoiding the capture of one's own queen.
- Jetan: A "Martian chess" invented by Edgar Rice Burroughs for his novel The Chessmen of Mars (1922), played on a 10×10 board. None of the pieces are standard chess pieces.
- Martian chess: Played with Icehouse pieces.
- Navia Dratp: A commercial variant: a cross between shogi and miniature wargaming played on a 7x7 board. The Navia is a king-like royal piece. Some pieces, including the Navia, have a compass that, when flipped over, changes the piece's movement. This is called dratp-ing the piece.
- Penultima: An inductive variant where the players must deduce hidden rules invented by "Spectators".
- The Duke: An abstract strategy game where the board, pieces, and gameplay mechanics have some strong parallels with chess.

== Chess-related historical and regional games ==
Some of these games have developed independently while others are ancestors or relatives of modern chess. The popularity of these variants may be limited to their respective places of origin (as is largely the case for shogi), or worldwide (as is the case for xiangqi). The games have their own institutions and traditions.

=== Historical ===
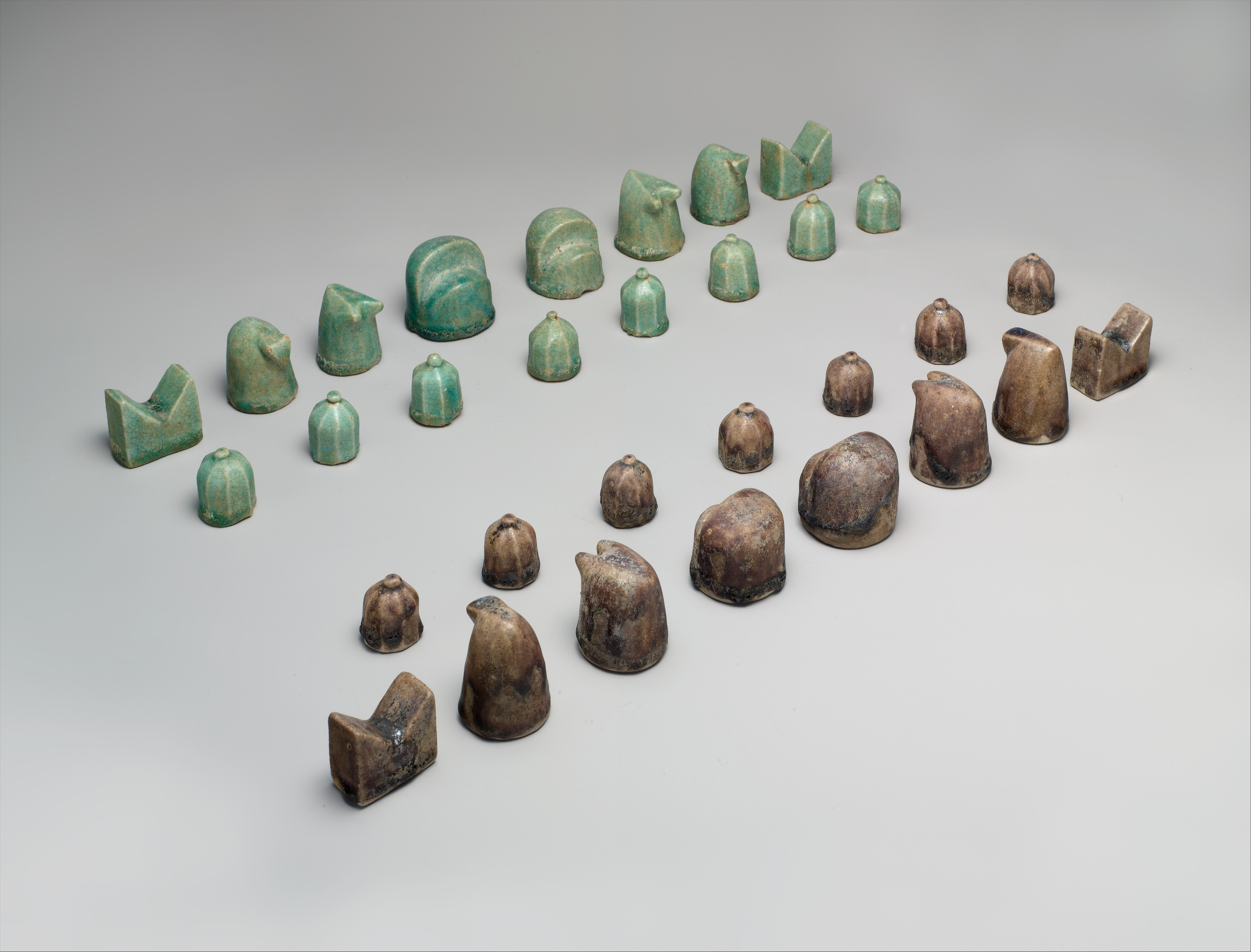
Shatranj set, 12th century

	a	b	c	d	e	f	g	h
8	a8	b8	c8	d8	e8	f8	g8	h8	8
7	a7	b7	c7	d7	e7	f7	g7	h7	7
6	a6	b6	c6	d6	e6	f6	g6	h6	6
5	a5	b5	c5	d5	e5	f5	g5	h5	5
4	a4	b4	c4	d4	e4	f4	g4	h4	4
3	a3	b3	c3	d3	e3	f3	g3	h3	3
2	a2	b2	c2	d2	e2	f2	g2	h2	2
1	a1	b1	c1	d1	e1	f1	g1	h1	1
	a	b	c	d	e	f	g	h

Chaturaji
- Chaturaji: Four-handed version of chaturanga, played with dice.
- Chaturanga: An ancient East Indian game, presumed to be the common ancestor of chess and other national chess-related games.
- Courier chess: Played in Europe from 13th to 19th century. Probably was one step in evolving modern chess out of shatranj.
- Grande Acedrex: Medieval Spanish variant from 13th century.
- Semedo: Invented by Jesuit missionaries in China.
- Shatranj: An ancient Persian game, derived from chaturanga.
- Short assize: Played in England and Paris in the second half of the 12th century.
- Tamerlane chess: A significantly expanded variation of shatranj.

=== Regional ===
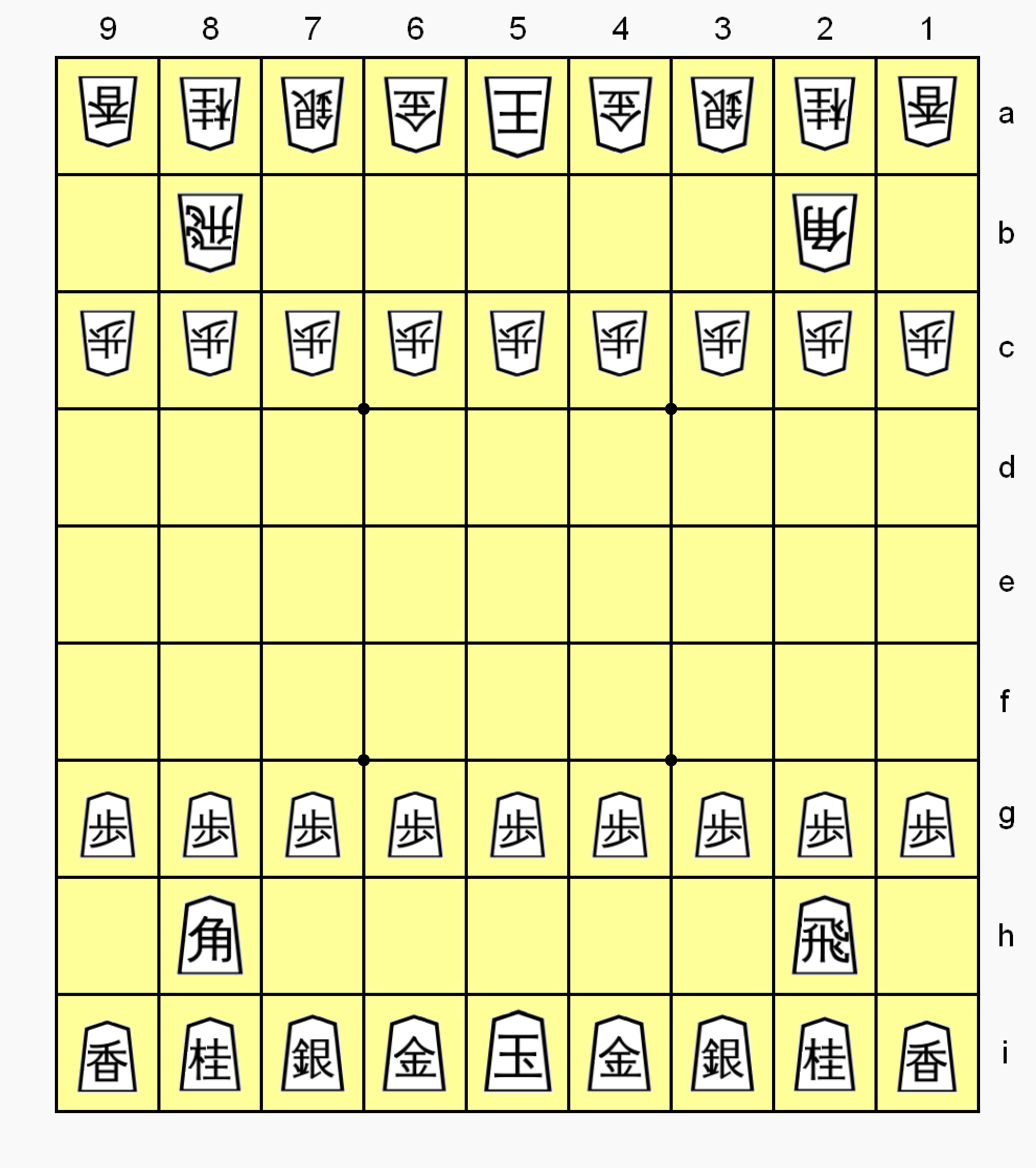
Shogi

Xiangqi

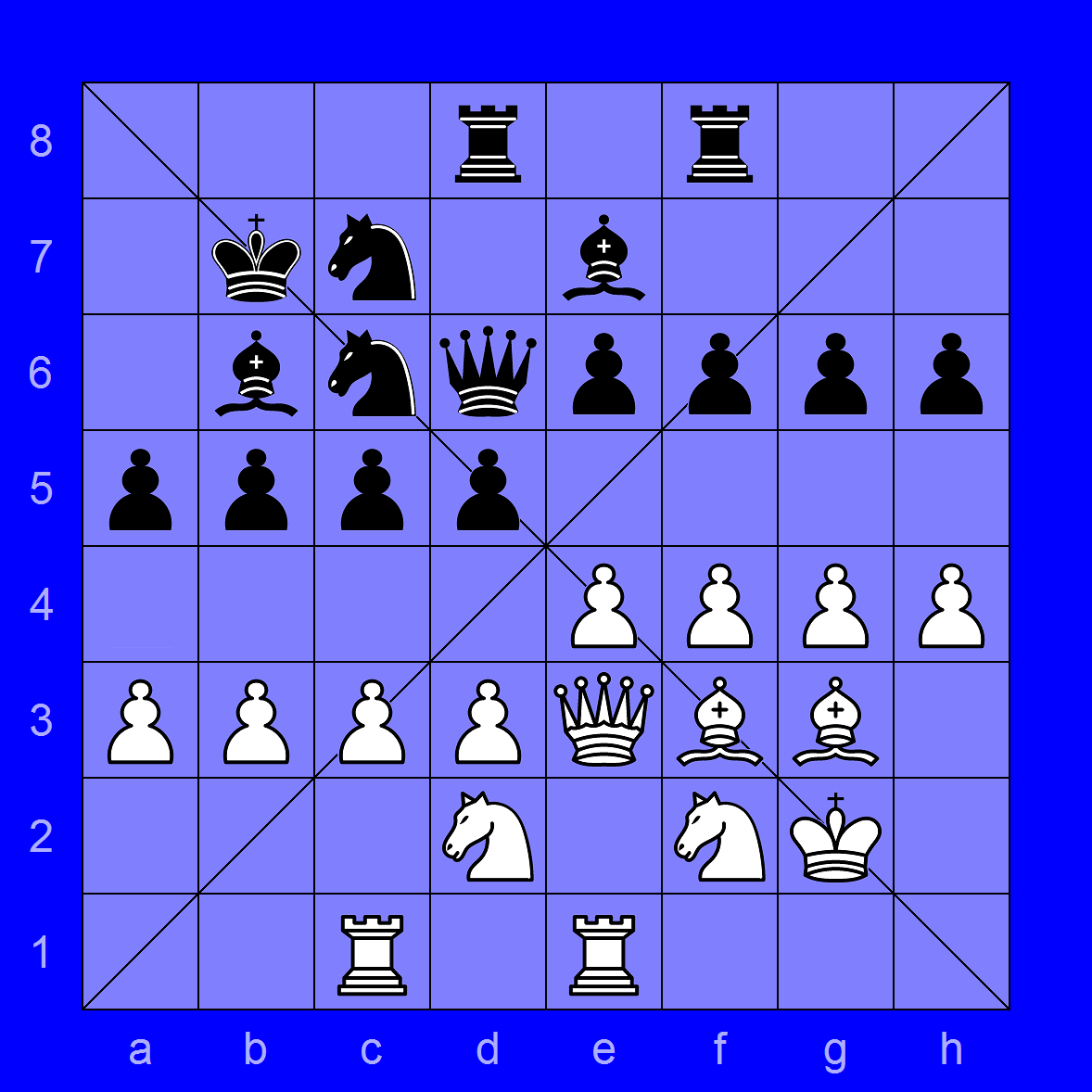
Sittuyin, players elect their own starting setups behind the pawns

- Chandraki (or Chandaraki or Tibetan Chess) [Tibet]: Possibly derived from Chaturanga.
- Game of the Three Kingdoms [China]: A 3-player variant of xiangqi that symbolizes the China's Three Kingdoms period war (221-264) between the rival states of Wei, Shu, and Wu.
- Hiashatar [Mongolia]: A 2-player variant played on a 10x10 board, with a fairy piece called a bodyguard. There is no castling or pawns can advance 1, 2, or 3 spaces on their first move.
- Indian chess [India]: A 2-player variant played in the 18th and 19th centuries on an 8x8 board. Each player has two rows of pieces at their side of the board.
- Janggi [Korea]: A variant derived from xiangqi. (See also: janggi variants.)
- Jungle (or 'Dou Shou Qi', The Jungle Game, Jungle Chess, Animals Chess, Oriental Chess, Children's Chess) [China]: Similar to the Western game Stratego.
- Madagascan Chess (or Samantsy) [Madagascar]: A game very similar to standard chess.
- Makruk [Thailand and Cambodia]: A 2-player variant played on an 8x8 board.
- Malay Chess (or Main chator, meaning "Game Chaturanga") [Malaysia, Indonesia, Philippines]: Pawns promote only on the a- and h-files.
- Ouk Chatrang [Cambodia]: A 2-player variant played on an 8x8 board.
- Rek Chess [Cambodia]: A 2-player variant with pieces that move as rooks, and have two distinctive types of capture: custodian capture, in which a piece captures an opponent piece by landing next to it, and intervention capture, in which a player captures two opponent pieces two spaces apart from each other in the same rank or file by landing between them.
- Senterej (or Ethiopian chess) [Ethiopia and Eritrea]: During the initial phase called werera (meaning "mobilization" or "marshalling"), which ends when the first piece is captured, players make multiple moves per turn. If a player has only a king and pawns, the game is a draw. The game stopped being played in or shortly after the 1930s.
- Shatar [Mongolia]: A 2-player variant played on a 8x8 board, with each player having 16 pieces in two rows.
- Shogi (or Japanese chess) [Japan]: A 2-player variant played with tiles on a 9x9 board. It includes a distinctive "drop rule", believed to have been formed in the 15th century, by which a player retains captured pieces "in hand" (mochigoma), and can drop them back onto the board in a future turn. This makes shogi's game tree complexity significantly higher than that of FIDE chess. (See also: shogi variants, especially chu shogi.)
- Sittuyin (or Burmese chess) [Burma]: A descendant of Chaturanga.
- Xiangqi (or Chinese chess or elephant chess) [China; also played in Vietnam]: A 2-player variant where pieces are placed on the intersections or "points" of the board, with each player having 9 pieces on the back row, and 7 farther forward. (See also: xiangqi variants)

== See also ==
- Advanced chess, Centaur chess or Cyborg chess
- Blindfold chess
- Chess handicap
- Correspondence chess
- Blitz chess
- Chess as mental training
- Chess boxing
- The Chess Variant Pages
- Fairy chess
- Fairy chess pieces
- Infinite chess (a class of chess games)
- Janggi variant
- List of abstract strategy games
- Outline of chess: Chess variants
- Shogi variant
- Xiangqi variant
