= Infinite chess =

Variation of chess

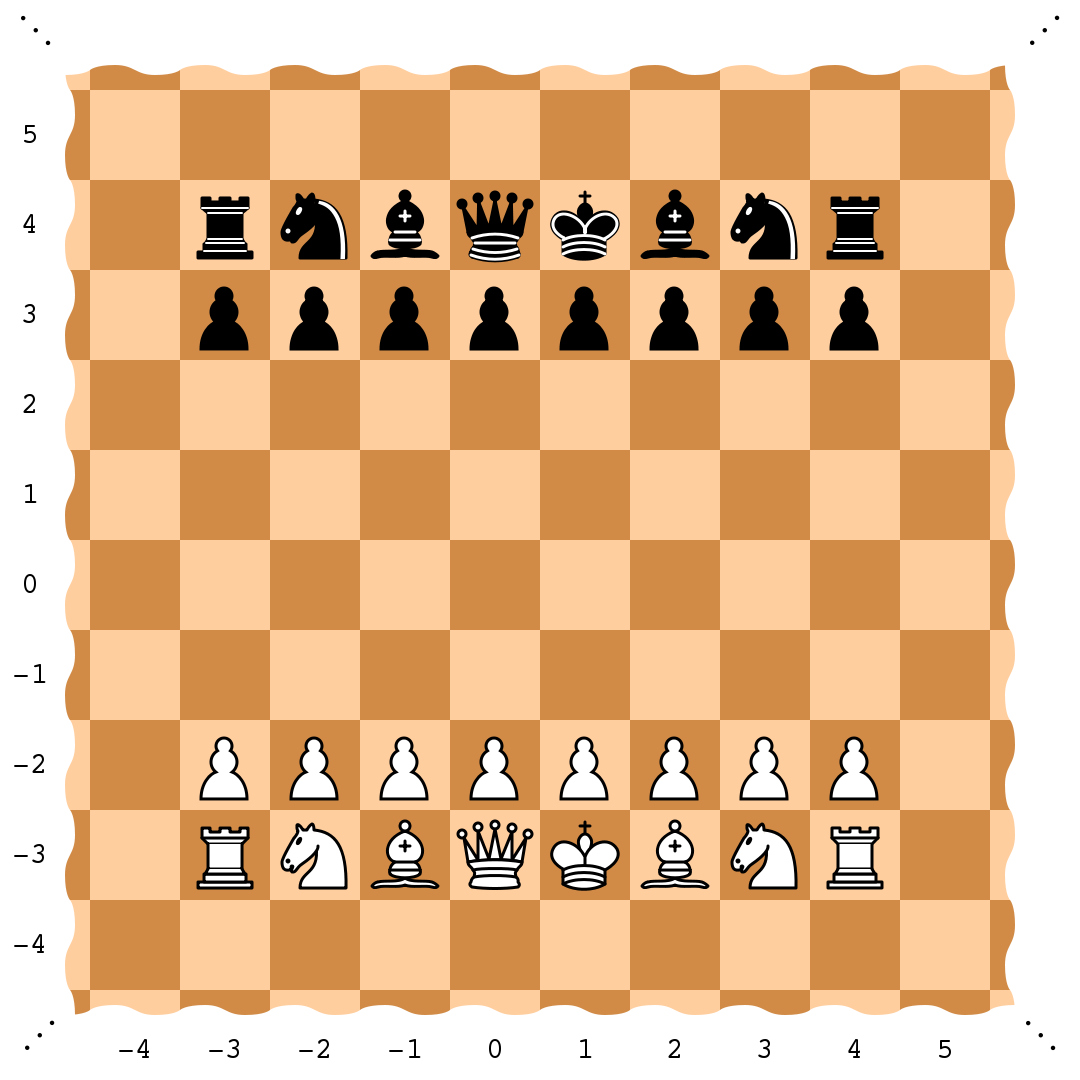
A simple infinite chess scheme (starting position), played on the infinitely large board. More complex schemes may include various fairy chess pieces.

Infinite chess is any variation of the game of chess played on an unbounded chessboard. Versions of infinite chess have been introduced independently by multiple players, chess theorists, and mathematicians, both as a playable game and as a model for theoretical study.

== Background ==
Classical (FIDE) chess is played on an 8×8 board (64 squares). However, the history of chess includes variants of the game played on boards of various larger sizes. For example, a predecessor game called courier chess was played on a slightly larger 12×8 board in the 12th century, and continued to be played for at least six hundred years. Japanese chess (shogi) has been played on boards of various sizes, with the largest being taikyoku shōgi ("ultimate chess"), which dates to the mid 16th century and was played on a 36×36 board using 402 pieces per player. More recently, chess hobbyists and mathematicians have occasionally studied chess played on arbitrarily large n×n boards to study general game theoretic concepts or to expand the theory of chess.

The first known reference to infinite chess itself was made in 1927 by mathematician Dénes Kőnig in a footnote of his famous mathematical essay about his eponymous lemma. In that footnote he considered a chess variant played on an unbounded board using pieces limited to a movement range of at most seven squares per turn. In the 21st century, infinite chess has been referenced increasingly often by various sources. For example, chess player Jianying Ji proposed an infinite chess variant using nightriders in 2000.

From 2010 onwards, infinite chess was popularized among mathematicians on MathOverflow, where concepts such as the decidability of checkmate on the unbounded board were discussed. This led to the publication of mathematical articles and the popularization of educational content concerning these questions in the following years.

Overall, chess players, chess theorists, and mathematicians are interested in versions of infinite chess, having different objectives in mind. While mathematicians are often interested in abstract properties of the game, chess theorists are interested in chess strategies unique to the infinite board; for instance, chess pieces, and in particular the king, cannot be trapped in corners on an infinite board and new patterns are required to form a checkmate. Finally, there are online communities where people play games of infinite chess against each other. There is no standard ruleset for infinite chess: different implementations either feature or omit fairy pieces, the fifty-move rule and pawn promotion, for example.

== Mathematical analysis ==
For infinite chess, it has been found that the mate-in-n problem for positions with finitely many pieces is decidable; that is, given a natural number n and a player to move and the positions (such as on $\mathbb{Z} \times \mathbb{Z}$) of a finite number of chess pieces that are uniformly mobile and with constant and linear freedom, there is an algorithm that will answer if there is a forced checkmate in at most n moves. One such algorithm consists of expressing the instance as a sentence in Presburger arithmetic and using the decision procedure for Presburger arithmetic.

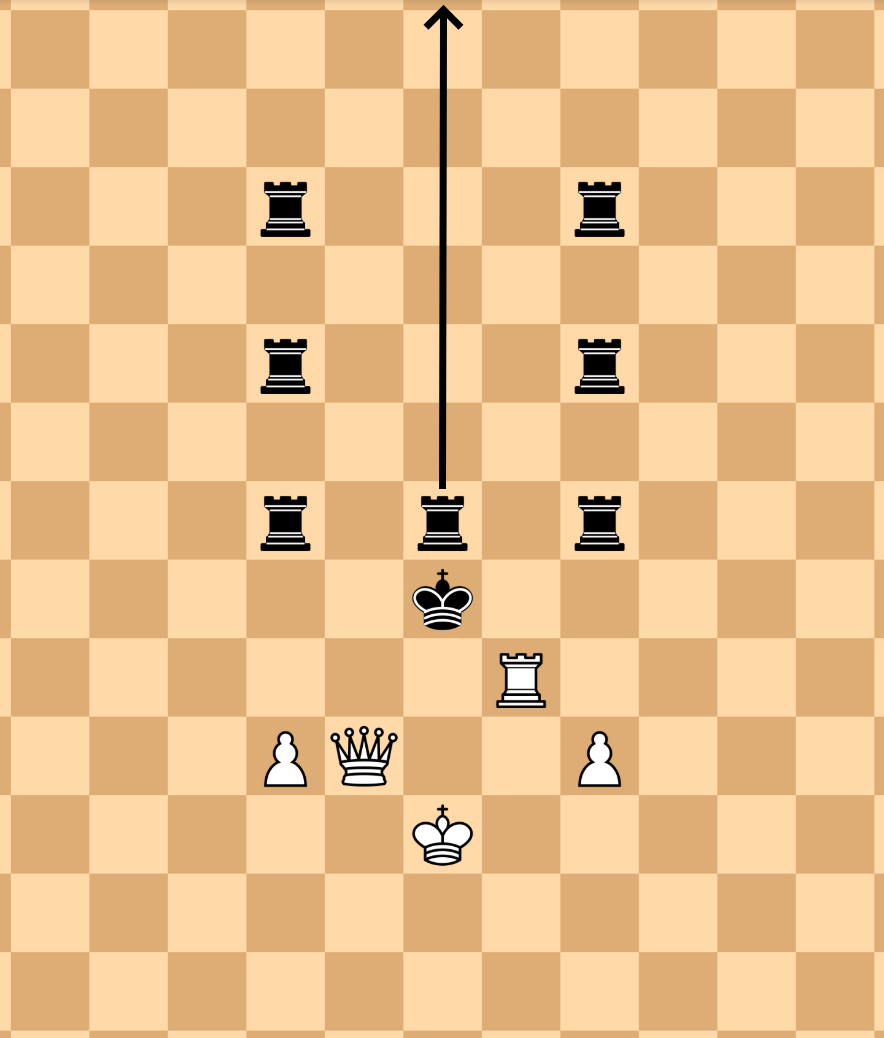
Infinite chess position with game value ω (Black to move). White is winning but Black can delay checkmate by any finite number of moves by moving his central rook upwards. White will be forced to slowly chase the black king upwards with checks until he is pushed next to his rook and checkmated.

However, the winning-position problem in general is not known to be decidable. Not only is there no uniform upper bound on the smallest value of n such that there is a mate-in-n, but there are also positions for which there is a forced mate but no integer n such that there is a mate-in-n. For example, there is a position with Black to move such that after an initial rook move by Black, the number of moves until White wins corresponds to the length of Black's move plus one. Since Black was free to move his rook by any arbitrary finite distance, the number of moves until checkmate in the initial position is unbounded. This led to the consideration of ordinal game values measuring the distance until checkmate:

Definition (Game value). The game value (for White) of a position in infinite chess is defined by transfinite recursion. Positions with value 0 are precisely those in which White has already won. If a position p has White to move, then the value of p is α + 1 if and only if α is the least ordinal such that White has a legal move from p to a position with value α. If a position p has Black to move, Black has at least one legal move, and every legal move from p has a value, then the value of p is the supremum of the values of those positions.

The definition identifies the positions with ordinal value α, by induction on α; some positions may be left without any value. The fundamental observation of game values is that the positions having an ordinal value are precisely the positions that are winning for White.

In 2016, it was shown that there exists an infinite chess position with infinitely many pieces which has a game value of ω^{4}.

== Pieces needed for checkmate ==
Checkmate in infinite chess generally requires more pieces than in standard chess. This is because many mating patterns in standard chess rely on the edge of the board to restrict the opposing king. For example, a king and queen can force checkmate only after driving the enemy king to an edge. Since an infinite board has no edges, a queen alone cannot provide the same confinement.

Mating constructions in infinite chess therefore often use an additional rider to create an artificial boundary. One example is a mating force consisting of a king and two rooks.

== See also ==
- List of chess variants
- Fairy chess pieces
