= No Castling Chess =

Chess variation

No Castling Chess is a variation of the game of chess invented by the former world chess champion Vladimir Kramnik and thoroughly explored by DeepMind, the team behind AlphaZero. In this variant, every rule is the same as chess, except that castling is not allowed. This variant reduces king safety, theoretically leading to more dynamic games, as it would be considerably harder to force a draw and the pieces would be forced to engage in a mêlée.

According to Kramnik, who assisted DeepMind, in exploring this variant, this game helps to sidestep opening preparation. He added: "This would inevitably lead to a considerably higher amount of decisive games in chess tournaments until the new theory develops, and more creativity would be required in order to win."

== Matches ==
- 2021: Former world champion Viswanathan Anand defeated Kramnik 2½–1½ in a No Castling Chess match under classical time controls as part of the annual chess festival in Dortmund.
- 2022: The tournament was expanded to a double round-robin with four players. Kramnik was due to play but had to withdraw after testing positive for COVID-19. Dmitrij Kollars, who replaced Kramnik, was the surprise winner of the tournament, his career-best performance at the time.
- 2023: Fabiano Caruana won after scoring 4/6, finishing half a point ahead of Kramnik.

== See also ==
- List of chess variants
