= Hand and brain =

Chess variant

Hand and brain (Note: Also spelled hand & brain, hand/brain, or hand-brain.) is a variant of chess. It is a multiplayer variant featuring team play with teams featuring one "hand" and one "brain" player.

== Overview and rules ==
The "hand and brain" multiplayer variant features pairs facing off; in each pair, one player is designated "hand" and the other "brain". The game features limited communication, with the "brain" player only able to call which piece to move. Aside from this, no other communication is permitted as the "hand" player then chooses which square to move the piece. Time controls can also be implemented for the variant. Chess.com wrote that "usually, but mainly for entertainment value, the stronger player takes the brain role and the other one plays the hand."

== History and presence in online streaming ==
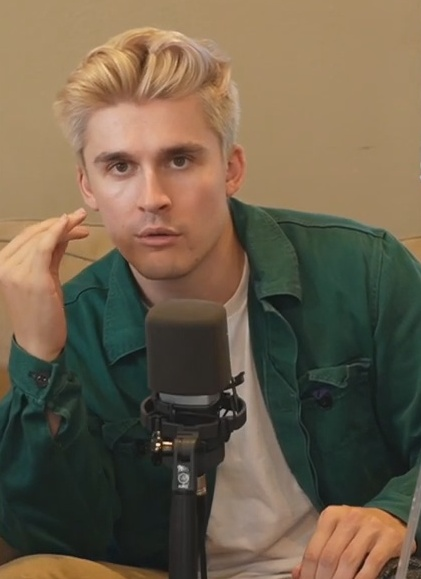
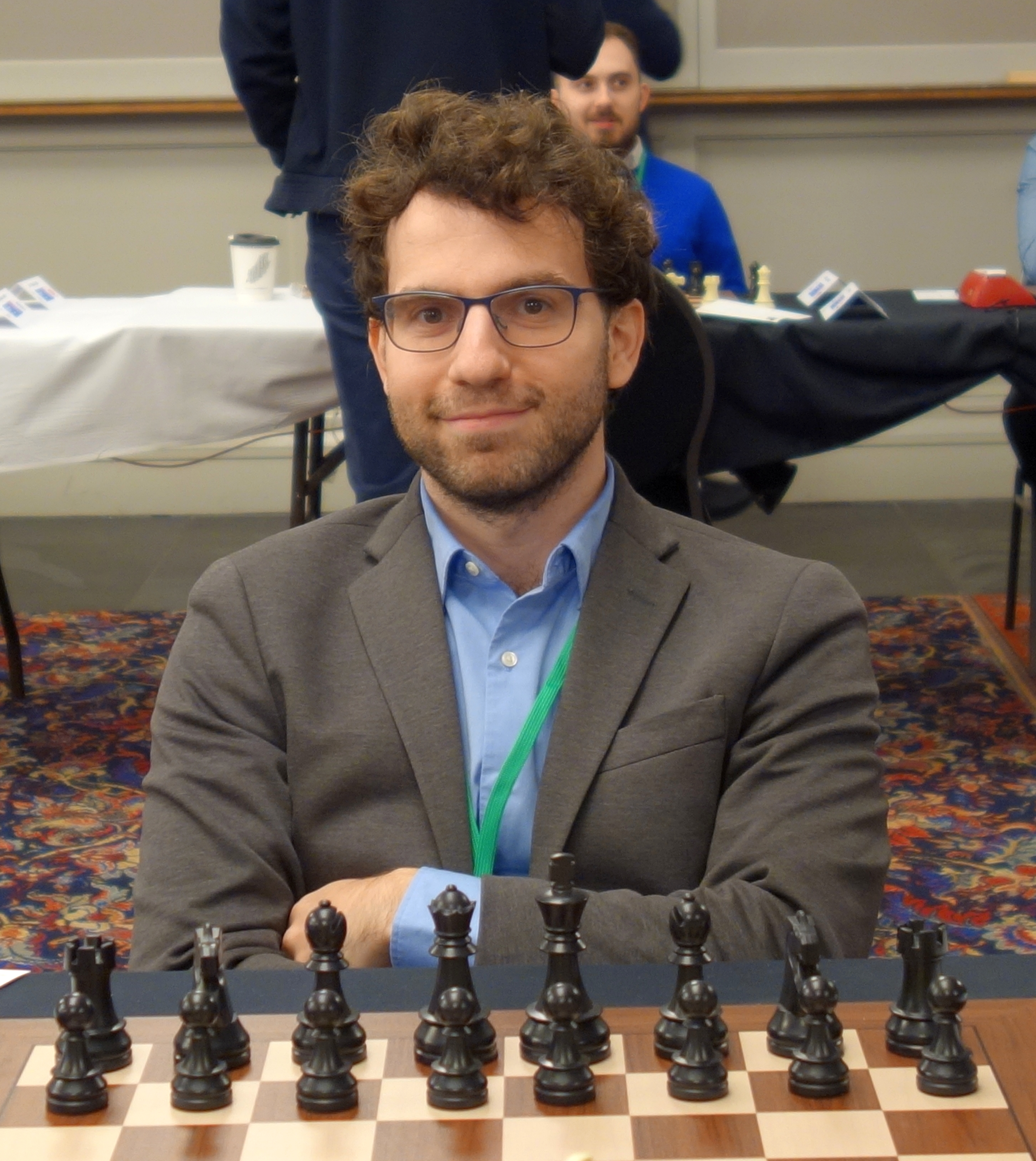
Ludwig (left) and Robert Hess (right) won the 2021 Twitch Rivals: Hand & Brain event

Alexandra Kosteniuk blogged about the variant being played during the 2013 Reykjavík Chess Open. In 2016, English grandmaster Matthew Sadler wrote about playing the variant with Natasha Regan during a 4NCL weekend. Due to the multiplayer nature of the variant, it is often played by chess players on stream. The variant is also common in matches featuring celebrities or figures popular outside of the chess world. Chess.com and PokerStars organized a joint event in 2019 featuring professional poker players playing the chess variant. Chess.com also organized hand and brain matches during their first ChessKid Games tournament in 2019.

In the 2020s, the variant gained traction and its play in tournaments increased in coverage. In April 2020, Chess.com organized a Hand and Brain match on Twitch under the theme "Zoomers Play Chess", highlighting top Generation Z chess players. Popular Twitch streamer Ludwig and grandmaster Robert Hess were the winning team of the variant at the 2021 Twitch Rivals event.

As part of the 2022 FTX Crypto Cup's opening ceremony, Levon Aronian and FTX Vice President Avinash Dabir played against Magnus Carlsen and KidSuper founder Colm Dillane in a hand and brain match, with the former pair winning.

== See also ==
- List of chess variants
