= Chad (chess variant) =

Chess variant

	a	b	c	d	e	f	g	h	i	j	k	l
12	a12	b12	c12	d12	e12	f12	g12	h12	i12	j12	k12	l12	12
11	a11	b11	c11	d11	e11	f11	g11	h11	i11	j11	k11	l11	11
10	a10	b10	c10	d10	e10	f10	g10	h10	i10	j10	k10	l10	10
9	a9	b9	c9	d9	e9	f9	g9	h9	i9	j9	k9	l9	9
8	a8	b8	c8	d8	e8	f8	g8	h8	i8	j8	k8	l8	8
7	a7	b7	c7	d7	e7	f7	g7	h7	i7	j7	k7	l7	7
6	a6	b6	c6	d6	e6	f6	g6	h6	i6	j6	k6	l6	6
5	a5	b5	c5	d5	e5	f5	g5	h5	i5	j5	k5	l5	5
4	a4	b4	c4	d4	e4	f4	g4	h4	i4	j4	k4	l4	4
3	a3	b3	c3	d3	e3	f3	g3	h3	i13	j3	k3	l3	3
2	a2	b2	c2	d2	e2	f2	g2	h2	i2	j2	k2	l2	2
1	a1	b1	c1	d1	e1	f1	g1	h1	i1	j1	k1	l1	1
	a	b	c	d	e	f	g	h	i	j	k	l

Chad gameboard and starting position. White moves first.

Chad is a chess variant for two players created by Christian Freeling in 1979. It is played on an uncheckered 12×12 gameboard with one king and eight rooks per side, where rooks are able to promote to queens.

The inventor's aim was "to create a game of tactical and strategical depth that was both simple and elegant to express the concept of mate—the 'pure' chess game". The game was played for many years at the Fanaat games club in the Netherlands and was featured in the periodical The Gamer in May–June 1982.

== Game rules ==
Each player owns a castle consisting of 3×3 squares surrounded by a wall of 12 squares. A king may not leave its 3×3 castle, but the other pieces are free to move unimpeded by castles or walls.

- The king can move and capture like a chess king or a chess knight. It can only capture pieces inside the 3×3 castle and cannot capture pieces on the wall.
- A rook moves like a rook in chess, and is unimpeded by castles or walls. If its move ends on a square in the enemy castle, it automatically promotes to a queen.
- A queen moves like a queen in chess and is unimpeded by castles or walls.
- Captures are limited: a capture can happen between a rook or queen and an enemy rook or queen only when one of the pieces is on the opponent's wall and the other piece is in its castle.
  - In other situations, rooks and queens cannot capture and simply block one another's movement. Only a king can capture an enemy piece inside its castle.
- A king is in check whenever it is in the path of an enemy rook or queen. Castle walls do not block checks.

As regular in chess, White moves first, a capturing piece replaces the piece captured, and checkmate wins the game.
