= Navia Dratp =

Japanese board game

Navia Dratp (Japanese: ナヴィア ドラップ) is a collectible miniatures game with similarities to shogi, the Japanese equivalent of chess. See also chess variants for similar games.

== Gameplay ==
Navia Dratp is unusual among collectible miniatures games in that it is a game of complete information, meaning that each player knows everything there is to know about the game state at any given time. The gameplay does not incorporate random elements of any kind (e.g. dice or a deck of cards), and all game pieces are visible to both players at all times.

=== Rules ===
What follows is a general overview of the mechanics of the game.

Navia Dratp is a board game, played on a 7-by-7 grid (by contrast, chess uses an 8-by-8 grid and shogi uses a 9-by-9 grid). Each player begins the game with seven Black Gulled Stones, and two Red Gulled Stones, which can be roughly equated with the pawns of chess or shogi. In addition, each player chooses a Navia and seven Maseitai from their collection of pieces. Navias are pre-painted miniatures of anime-style women. They serve roughly the same function as a chess or shogi king in that the capture of an opponent's Navia wins the game. Maseitai comprise the bulk of the collectible figures, and are generally more powerful than Gulled or Navias. Each Maseitai and Navia figure has a plastic disc called the compass that indicates the piece's movement abilities. By paying Gyullas crystals, which are earned by moving Gulled stones or by capturing your opponent's Maseitai, players can dratp Navia or Maseitai pieces, which allows the player to flip over the piece's compass, granting it different movement capabilities or other abilities. In the Navia's case, dratping it wins the game. This flipping over of pieces to grant them additional powers is similar to promotion in the game of shogi or checkers.

Players take turns moving and/or dratping pieces. Captures are made by moving onto a space occupied by an opponent's piece, as in chess and shogi. The Navia and Gulled begin the game already on the playfield, while Maseitai start in a special area called the keep and are brought into play through summoning, which means that a player spends their turn by placing a Maseitai from their keep onto one of eight summon squares. The dratped form of some Maseitai have special invoke abilities that offer alternatives to the basic actions of moving, dratping and summoning. A player may not take their own Maseitai.

The game can be won in one of five ways:

- Capturing an opponent's Navia
- Dratping your own Navia
- Performing a Navia Goal by emptying your keep of Maseitai and moving your Navia over the back line of the opponent's side of the board
- If a player's Navia is repeatedly put into check such that the same board position repeats itself three times, the player whose Navia was being put in check (not the player putting the Navia in check) wins
- A player may concede the game

== Product line ==
Navia Dratp was manufactured by Bandai, and was sold as starter sets and booster packs. The starter sets contain a board and equipment for one person to play, including a predetermined Navia, a set of Gulled Stones and Gyullas crystals, seven predetermined Maseitai, and cards describing each Maseitai and the Navia. Boosters contain three randomly selected Maseitai or Navia.

Bandai has stopped manufacturing the game, with the website (formerly naviadratp.com) now defunct and the game considered out-of-print.

Each starter set contained:

- 1 Navia (N-XX)
- 7 Maseitai battle pieces (M-XX)
- 9 Gulled battle pieces (7 black, 2 red)
- 17 Gyullas stones (10 white, 6 blue, 1 yellow)
- 8 character cards
- 1 game board

The Red Starter (starter 1) included:

- N-01 Estelle
- M-01 Troll
- M-02 Agunilyos
- M-03 Hamlus Garuda
- M-04 Garrison
- M-05 Netol
- M-06 Gundrill
- M-07 Tiny Kiggoshi

The Blue Starter (starter 2) included:

- N-02 Debora
- M-08 Olip
- M-09 Gilgame
- M-10 Moses
- M-11 Nebguard
- M-12 Gyullas Turtle
- M-13 Kapinah
- M-14 Koma

Each booster contained:

- 3 randomly-inserted figures
- 3 corresponding character cards

The first expansion, Unleashed Darkness, added 17 new figures to the game:

- N-03 Io
- N-04 Krra
- M-15 Schmidt
- M-16 Matogayu
- M-17 Midrah
- M-18 Kanaba
- M-19 Sungyullas
- M-20 Tanhoizer
- M-21 Kanimizo
- M-22 Billpentod
- M-23 Hansa
- M-24 Kapinahs
- M-25 Odd DD
- M-26 Coydrocomp
- M-27 Nemchant
- M-28 Lord Kiggoshi
- M-29 Chugyullas

The second expansion, Resurgence, added another 17 figures along with some redone figures in a different design:

- N-05 Chakrapicky
- N-06 Hillgao
- M-30 Chakrabat
- M-31 Papillonera
- M-32 Tagu
- M-33 Viskunmateus
- M-34 Laynard
- M-35 Nergalgamesh
- M-36 Kairas
- M-37 Ghoramedusa
- M-38 Gyullasbon
- M-39 Wishborn
- M-40 Peojin
- M-41 Neso
- M-42 Gilgame III
- M-43 Oriondober
- M-44 Sabageo

There was also a limited new Navia N-007, Persephone, which was available from Bandai. It was produced in a very small number of 300 pieces.

== Fan-made content ==
When the game was discontinued, the community started to develop new content. There are currently four fan-made game expansions:

- Maelstorm (2008): 15 new Maseitai battle pieces
- Dynatmos Gulled Recruits (2018): seven new Gulled battle pieces
- Vengeance (2018): 15 new Maseitai battle pieces
- Arcanum (2020): 16 new Maseitai battle pieces

Three- and four-player versions of the board have been developed, removing the initial limitation of two players.
