= Double chess =

Chess variant played on a 16×12 board

	a	b	c	d	e	f	g	h	i	j	k	l	m	n	o	p
12	a12 black rook	b12 black knight	c12 black bishop	d12 black queen	e12 black king	f12 black bishop	g12 black knight	h12 black rook	i12 black rook	j12 black knight	k12 black bishop	l12 black queen	m12 black king	n12 black bishop	o12 black knight	p12 black rook	12
11	a11 black pawn	b11 black pawn	c11 black pawn	d11 black pawn	e11 black pawn	f11 black pawn	g11 black pawn	h11 black pawn	i11 black pawn	j11 black pawn	k11 black pawn	l11 black pawn	m11 black pawn	n11 black pawn	o11 black pawn	p11 black pawn	11
10	a10	b10	c10	d10	e10	f10	g10	h10	i10	j10	k10	l10	m10	n10	o10	p10	10
9	a9	b9	c9	d9	e9	f9	g9	h9	i9	j9	k9	l9	m9	n9	o9	p9	9
8	a8	b8	c8	d8	e8	f8	g8	h8	i8	j8	k8	l8	m8	n8	o8	p8	8
7	a7	b7	c7	d7	e7	f7	g7	h7	i7	j7	k7	l7	m7	n7	o7	p7	7
6	a6	b6	c6	d6	e6	f6	g6	h6	i6	j6	k6	l6	m6	n6	o6	p6	6
5	a5	b5	c5	d5	e5	f5	g5	h5	i5	j5	k5	l5	m5	n5	o5	p5	5
4	a4	b4	c4	d4	e4	f4	g4	h4	i4	j4	k4	l4	m4	n4	o4	p4	4
3	a3	b3	c3	d3	e3	f3	g3	h3	i3	j3	k3	l3	m3	n3	o3	p3	3
2	a2 white pawn	b2 white pawn	c2 white pawn	d2 white pawn	e2 white pawn	f2 white pawn	g2 white pawn	h2 white pawn	i2 white pawn	j2 white pawn	k2 white pawn	l2 white pawn	m2 white pawn	n2 white pawn	o2 white pawn	p2 white pawn	2
1	a1 white rook	b1 white knight	c1 white bishop	d1 white queen	e1 white king	f1 white bishop	g1 white knight	h1 white rook	i1 white rook	j1 white knight	k1 white bishop	l1 white queen	m1 white king	n1 white bishop	o1 white knight	p1 white rook	1
	a	b	c	d	e	f	g	h	i	j	k	l	m	n	o	p

Double chess board and initial setup. Pawns advance up to four squares on their first move

Double chess is a chess variant invented by Julian S. Grant Hayward in 1916. The game is played on a 16×12 chessboard with each player in control of two complete armies placed side by side.

The rules were published in the January 1929 issue of British Chess Magazine.

== Game rules ==
The illustration shows the starting setup. A player wins by checkmating either enemy king.

Additional rules:

- Pawns have an initial up-to-four step option. En passant captures are permitted.
- A king may castle only on its own half of the board.

As in standard chess, pawns promote upon reaching the furthest rank.

== Capablanca vs. Maróczy match ==
J. R. Capablanca, who had experimented with different forms of chess in the 1920s, found the game "remarkably interesting", and a four-game match was held with Géza Maróczy on 22nd to 26th April 1929 at the Royal Automobile Club, Pall Mall, London. Capablanca won the match (+2−0=2).

The only known game score from the match is of the first game, having a time control requiring 30 moves per 90 minutes by each player: (Note: "The first game was played at the rate of 30 moves in one-and-a-half hours; the subsequent games at 30 moves an hour. Only the score of the first game is known to exist. The last game was reportedly the most interesting. Game 1: 93 moves Capablanca won Game 2: 82 moves Drawn Game 3: 74 moves Capablanca won Game 4: 63 moves Drawn")

	a	b	c	d	e	f	g	h	i	j	k	l	m	n	o	p
12	a12	b12	c12 black king	d12	e12	f12	g12	h12 black rook	i12	j12 black rook	k12	l12	m12	n12 black rook	o12	p12	12
11	a11 black pawn	b11 black pawn	c11 black pawn	d11	e11 black knight	f11 black bishop	g11	h11	i11	j11	k11	l11	m11	n11 black pawn	o11 black pawn	p11 black king	11
10	a10	b10	c10	d10	e10	f10	g10	h10	i10	j10	k10	l10	m10	n10	o10	p10 black pawn	10
9	a9	b9	c9	d9	e9	f9	g9	h9	i9 black knight	j9	k9	l9 black pawn	m9 black pawn	n9	o9	p9 black queen	9
8	a8	b8	c8	d8 black pawn	e8 black pawn	f8	g8	h8 black pawn	i8	j8	k8 black pawn	l8	m8	n8	o8	p8 white knight	8
7	a7	b7	c7	d7	e7	f7 black pawn	g7	h7 white pawn	i7 black pawn	j7	k7	l7	m7	n7	o7	p7	7
6	a6	b6	c6	d6	e6	f6	g6 black pawn	h6	i6 white pawn	j6 black knight	k6 white pawn	l6	m6	n6 white pawn	o6	p6	6
5	a5	b5	c5	d5	e5	f5	g5 white pawn	h5	i5 white knight	j5	k5	l5 white pawn	m5	n5	o5 white rook	p5	5
4	a4	b4	c4	d4	e4 white pawn	f4	g4	h4	i4	j4	k4	l4	m4	n4	o4	p4 white queen	4
3	a3	b3	c3 white knight	d3 white pawn	e3	f3	g3	h3	i3	j3	k3	l3	m3 white pawn	n3	o3	p3	3
2	a2 white pawn	b2 white pawn	c2 white pawn	d2	e2	f2 white pawn	g2	h2	i2	j2	k2	l2	m2	n2	o2 white pawn	p2 white pawn	2
1	a1	b1	c1 white king	d1	e1	f1	g1 white knight	h1 white rook	i1 white rook	j1	k1	l1	m1	n1	o1 white king	p1	1
	a	b	c	d	e	f	g	h	i	j	k	l	m	n	o	p

Position after 58.Nxg1

White: Maróczy Black: Capablanca
1.i6 m10 2.h6 Nn10 3.Nc3 Nc10 4.Nn3 d8 5.m3 e8 6.Bl3 Bd10 7.d3 Be10 8.g5 Qd11 9.e4 0-0-0 10.Be3 f7 11.Qg4 g7 12.0-0-0 Nf10 13.Bfj5 Rdg12 14.Qh3 h8 15.Qm2 i7 16.Ni3 Ng8 17.h7 Ni9 18.Nge2 k8 19.k5 j7 20.Bjk4 Njk10 21.j5 g6 22.Ng4 Nj8 23.Bh4 Ne11 24.Bi5 Nl7 25.Bxd10 Qxd10 26.Qh2 Nl9 27.Bk2 Qo9 28.k6 Qxh2 29.Rxh2 Nj6 30.Bh1 jxk6 31.jxk6 Bh9 32.Ni5 Bef11 33.0-0 Nm7 34.Nl4 Bj8 35.Qo4 0-0 36.Bn7 Rij12 37.n6 Nml5 38.Rn5 Ql10 39.Rh4 Ql6 40.Qp4 Nj4 41.Nj5 Qn8 42.Rxj4 Qxn7 43.l5 Qn10 44.Rp5 p10 45.Ro4 Kp11 46.Bf4 Bl10 47.Bh2 Bn8 48.Nl6 Bj11 49.Bo6 Bxo6 50.Rxo6 l9 51.Ro8 m9 52.Rdh1 Rg10 53.Bg1 Qn9 54.R8o5 Ro10 55.Nn7 Rxo5 56.Rxo5 Bxg1 57.Np8 Qp9 58.Nxg1 (diagram) Nxl5 59.Rh4 Rj9 60.Rho4 Ro12 61.n7 Nxm3 62.Rm4 Nk2 63.Rk1 Rhj12 64.Rxk2 Rj1+ 65.Kn2 Rxg1+ 66.Kd2 Nk10 67.Qp7 Nl8 68.Qo7 n10 69.Rkm2 Nn9 70.Nxn9 Qxn9 71.Qn6 Rj11 72.Ko3 l8 73.Rn4 Qn8 74.Rn3 Ri1 75.Ne2 Ri3 76.Rmm3 Rxm3 77.Rxm3 Rj6 78.Nf4 Qh2 79.Nfh3 Ql2 80.Qn4 Bxk6 81.Nxk6 Rxk6 82.p4 Rk3 83.Rm5 Rj12 84.Kp2 Rxh3 85.Qi4+ l7 86.Qxh3 Qxf2+ 87.Kc3 Rj2 88.Ro3 Qc5+ 89.Kb3 Qxc2+ 90.Kb4 Qxb2+ 91.Kc4 Rc2+ 92.Kd5 Qb5+ 93.Kd4 Qc5# 0–1

== See also ==
- Tweedle Chess – a variant with two kings and two queens per side on a 10×10 board.
