= Jean-Louis Cazaux =

- Born: Jean-Louis Gabriel Cazaux; December 26, 1960 (age 65); Tarbes, France
- Occupations: Author, game designer, board game historian
- Known for: History of chess, chess variants

Jean-Louis Gabriel Cazaux (born 26 December 1960) is a French board game author, game designer, and historian. He specializes in the history of strategy games, particularly the various global forms and variants of chess.

== Biography ==
Cazaux is a member of "Le MALT" (*Mouvement des Auteurs Ludiques Toulousains*), a collective of board game authors based in Toulouse.

== Bibliography ==
=== Books ===
- Guide des échecs exotiques et insolites, Éditions Chiron, 2000 (ISBN 2-7027-0628-2)
- L'Univers des échecs (co-authored with Pascal Reysset), Éditions Bornemann, 2000 (ISBN 285182631X)
- Du senet au backgammon, les Jeux de parcours, Éditions Chiron, 2003 (ISBN 2-7027-1010-7)
- Les Jeux de dés (with Michel Criton), POLE, 2007 (ISBN 284884055-2)
- Petite histoire des échecs, POLE, 2009 (ISBN 978-2848840987)
- L’Odyssée des jeux d’échecs, PRAXEO, 2010 (ISBN 2-9520472-8-6)
- Traité pratique de métamachie, Pionissimo, 2012 (ISBN 978-2-9541313-0-6)
- Les jeux de parcours à travers les siècles et les continents, Pionissimo, 2012 (ISBN 978-2-9541313-1-3)

In English:

- The Anatomy Of Chess (with Gerhard Josten and Myron Samsin), Thema Schach, Vol. 8, Promos-Verlag GmbH (ISBN 3-88502-028-9)
- A World of Chess: Its Development and Variations through Centuries and Civilizations (with Rick Knowlton), McFarland, 2017 (ISBN 978-0786494279)

=== Other publications ===
- "Is Chess a Hybrid Game?" (IGK Symposium, Amsterdam, 2001)
- "We played Liubo last night !" (Abstract Games Magazine, Issue 15, Autumn 2003)
- "Échec et mad !" (Vox Ludi, March–April 2004)
- "Qui a inventé les jeux de cartes ?" (Vox Ludi, July–August 2004)
- "11 règles pour jouer comme les Romains" (Vox Ludi, September–October 2004)
- "Échecs et chaturanga : la fin d'un mythe" (Praxeo, November 2010)
- "Les Jeux d'échecs au Moyen Âge, ou la quête du jeu parfait" (Histoire et Images médiévales, No. 28, February–March–April 2012)
- "La Rithmomachie, jeu des philosophes ou des mathématiciens ?" (Histoire et Images médiévales, No. 28, February–March–April 2012)

In August 2012, Jean-Louis Cazaux was a guest speaker at the French Chess Championship in Pau.

== Ludography ==
Jean-Louis Cazaux is the designer of several games:

- Ovalia: a combination card game inspired by rugby.
- Several chess variants, including:
  - Shako: played on a 10×10 board.
  - Rollerball: where pieces move around a circular track (inspired by the movie of the same name).
  - Metamachy: "beyond chess", played on a 12×12 board with 12 distinct piece types.

These chess variants are playable online on the Jocly platform.

- GeoXpert: a pattern-matching card game where each card represents one of the 197 countries in the world.
- Ecliptic: a tactical game combining astrology-inspired cards.
- K6T: an expanded traditional card deck with six suits of 20 cards each.
