= Checkless chess =

Chess variant

Checkless chess, also known as prohibition chess, is a chess variant where neither player may give check unless it is checkmate. All other rules are as in regular chess. The origin of the game is unknown, dating from the mid-19th century. The variant is a popular chess problem theme, usually requiring a fairy mate.

== Observations ==
The single rule change has a profound impact on gameplay. Since the king is immune to most attacks as long as it avoids being checkmated, checks cannot be used to gain time or chase the king to an unsafe position. Also, mating patterns are generally significantly more difficult to execute.

Another effect of this rule is that the king, immune from attack, is now a powerful force. The king can defend pieces by placing itself such that their capture would place the king in check. The king can advance into the enemy position, creating havoc in the enemy camp as enemy pieces need to avoid moving to squares from which they would give check.

== Variations ==
Position: c6 black king, b4 white pawn, e3 black bishop, b2 black rook, h1 white king

This is stalemate if White is to move in this variant. 1.b5+ puts the black king in check but does not deliver checkmate, so it is illegal.

Position: g7 black bishop, e5 black king, h4 white bishop, c3 white king, d2 white rook

In variants where a check is considered checkmate if the only responses are cross-checks, then White checkmates with 1.Re2 or 1.Rd5, as all king moves would result in discovered check from the black bishop.

Some rules variations exist:

- If on their turn a player is not in check and no move is possible without delivering check without being checkmate, the player might be considered either to be stalemated or to lose.
- A checking move might be considered either to be legal only if it would be a checkmate in orthodox chess or to deliver checkmate if any response would be a cross-check. The latter is an example of a fairy mate.
- Absolute Checkless Chess is a variant by Dr. Roger Powell in 1975, whereby pieces may not cross any square from which they would give check.
- Some authorities have suggested a variation where checks are permitted if they are part of a series of checks resulting in forced mate.

== Problem ==
T. R. Dawson, Die Welt (1951)

Position: d8 black queen, b7 white knight, c7 black pawn, f7 black pawn, c6 white king, d6 black pawn, h6 black pawn, f5 white pawn, h5 white queen, e4 black king, f4 white pawn, e2 white pawn, h1 black bishop

White mates in 2

Solution: 1.f6 (threatening 2.Qf5#)

- 1...Qc8 2.Nxd6#
- 1...Qxf6 2.Nc5#
- 1...d5 2.Qe5#
