= Pocket mutation chess =

Chess variant

- Designers: Mike Nelson
- Genres: Chess variant
- Players: 2
- Skills: Strategy, tactics

Pocket mutation chess is a chess variant invented by Mike Nelson in 2003.

In this game, a player can take a piece from the board and put it into a pocket. The piece in the pocket can be put back on the board later. When placing the piece into the pocket the player can mutate the piece, i.e. change it to a different piece.

The game was one of the Recognized Chess Variants at The Chess Variant Pages before the program was discontinued.

== Rules ==
The starting position in this game is the same as in standard chess and players make moves as in standard chess. Instead of moving, a player can take one of their own pieces from the board and put it into the pocket, provided that the pocket is empty. If the piece is placed into the pocket from the last rank, it gets promoted to a piece of a higher class. Otherwise, the player has an option to mutate the piece into a different piece of the same class. The choice of mutating (or not) must be made at the time the piece is removed. White cannot use the pocket on the first move. The king cannot be placed into the pocket.

As a players move, a piece in the pocket can be dropped on any empty position on the board, except the last rank. A pawn can make only a single step from the first rank, but can do a double step from the second one, even if dropped there or moved from the first rank. The en passant rule applies as in standard chess. Pawns that reach the last rank do not get promoted immediately. Instead, they can be placed into the pocket and promoted to a piece of higher class.

There is no castling in this chess variant. The game is declared a draw if no capture or promotion was made for 50 consecutive moves.

== Classes of the pieces ==
Besides usual pieces there are several fairy chess pieces in this game. All pieces are divided into the following classes. All pieces from the same class are of presumably the same (or close) value.

Class	Usual pieces	Combined with knight	Combined with nightrider	Combined with king	Combined with nightrider and king
1	pawn				
2	bishop	knight			
3	rook		nightrider	super bishop (bishop+king)	
4		cardinal (bishop+knight)		super rook (rook+king)	
5	queen	chancellor (rook+knight)	cardinal rider (bishop+nightrider)	super cardinal (bishop+knight+king)	
6			chancellor rider (rook+nightrider)	super chancellor (rook+knight+king)	super cardinal rider (bishop+nightrider+king)
7		amazon (queen+knight)			super chancellor rider (rook+nightrider+king)
8			amazon rider (queen+nightrider)		

Position: e8 black cross, d6 black cross, h5 black cross, a4 black cross, c4 black cross, f4 black cross, d3 black cross, b2 white upside-down knight, d1 black cross

Nightrider makes any number of knight moves in the same direction.
