= Jeson Mor =

Chess variant board game

	a	b	c	d	e	f	g	h	i
9	a9 black knight	b9 black knight	c9 black knight	d9 black knight	e9 black knight	f9 black knight	g9 black knight	h9 black knight	i9 black knight	9
8	a8	b8	c8	d8	e8	f8	g8	h8	i8	8
7	a7	b7	c7	d7	e7	f7	g7	h7	i7	7
6	a6	b6	c6	d6	e6	f6	g6	h6	i6	6
5	a5	b5	c5	d5	e5 white cross	f5	g5	h5	i5	5
4	a4	b4	c4	d4	e4	f4	g4	h4	i4	4
3	a3	b3	c3	d3	e3	f3	g3	h3	i3	3
2	a2	b2	c2	d2	e2	f2	g2	h2	i2	2
1	a1 white knight	b1 white knight	c1 white knight	d1 white knight	e1 white knight	f1 white knight	g1 white knight	h1 white knight	i1 white knight	1
	a	b	c	d	e	f	g	h	i

Jeson Mor gameboard and starting setup

Jeson Mor ('Nine Horses') is a two-player strategy board game from Mongolia. It is considered a chess variant. The game is played on a 9×9 checkered gameboard. Each player has nine chess knights initially lined up on the players' first ranks. A player wins by being first to occupy the central square (square e5) with a knight and then leave that square.

== Equipment ==
A 9×9 square checkered board is used. Alternatively, an 8×8 square grid can be used with pieces played on the intersection points. Each player has a set of nine chess knights in their own color.

== Rules ==
Players decide who is White, who is Black, and who moves first. Players alternate turns. Knights are initially set up on each player's first rank.

- Knights move or capture exactly as chess knights.
- On a player's turn, a knight can move to an empty square or capture an enemy knight. A knight on the central square (e5) may be captured by the opponent.
- The player first to move a knight to the central square of the board (e5), and then leave that square on a subsequent move, wins the game. An alternative way to win is to capture all the opponent's pieces.

== Strategy ==
	a	b	c	d	e	f	g	h	i
9	a9	b9	c9	d9	e9	f9	g9	h9	i9	9
8	a8	b8	c8	d8	e8	f8	g8	h8	i8	8
7	a7	b7	c7	d7 black knight	e7	f7 black knight	g7	h7	i7	7
6	a6	b6	c6 black knight	d6	e6	f6	g6 black knight	h6	i6	6
5	a5	b5	c5	d5	e5 white cross	f5	g5	h5	i5	5
4	a4	b4	c4 white knight	d4	e4	f4	g4 white knight	h4	i4	4
3	a3	b3	c3	d3 white knight	e3	f3 white knight	g3	h3	i3	3
2	a2	b2	c2	d2	e2	f2	g2	h2	i2	2
1	a1	b1	c1	d1	e1	f1	g1	h1	i1	1
	a	b	c	d	e	f	g	h	i

Example of zugzwang. The player to move either must occupy the center, or move a knight away. Both cases end in losing.

Occupy the central square if and only if you have strictly more knights attacking that square. If you have fewer knights attacking the central square than your opponent, you should equalize the number of your knights attacking it to avoid losing.
