= Rhombic chess =

Chess variant

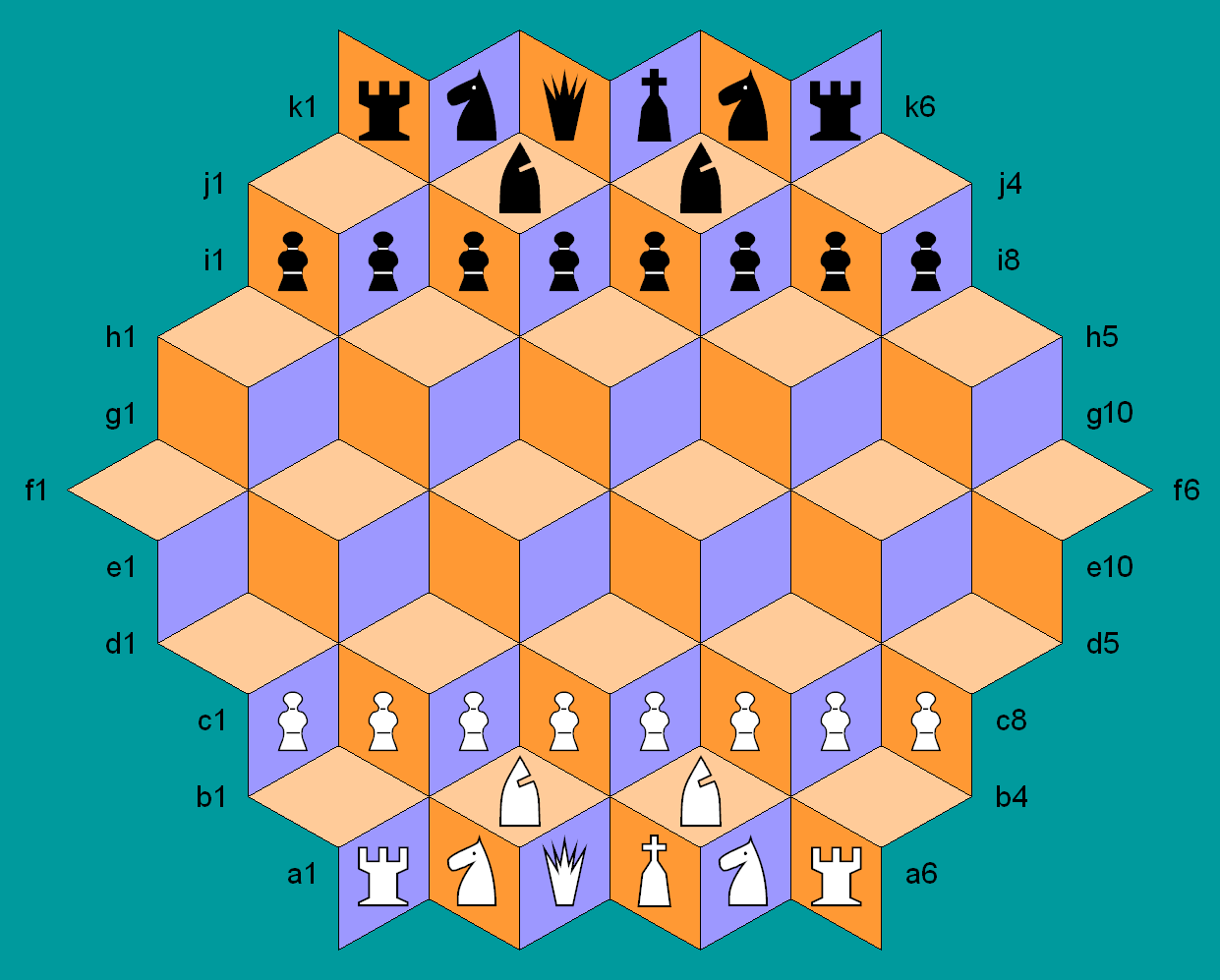
Rhombic chess starting setup. Each side commands a standard set of chess pieces. Cell colors highlight pointwise movement.

Rhombic chess is a chess variant for two players created by Tony Paletta in 1980. The gameboard has an overall hexagonal shape and comprises 72 rhombi in three alternating colors. Each player commands a full set of standard chess pieces.

The game was first published in Chess Spectrum Newsletter 2 by the inventor. It was included in World Game Review No. 10 edited by Michael Keller.

== Game rules ==
The diagram shows the starting setup. As in standard chess, White moves first and checkmate wins the game. Piece moves are described using two basic types of movement:

- Edgewise—through the common side of adjoining cells. If an edgewise move is more than one step, it continues in a straight line from the side of a cell through its opposite side, the line being orthogonal to these sides.
- Pointwise—through the sharpest corner of a cell, in a straight line to the next cell. (The paths are highlighted on the board by same-colored cells.)

=== Piece moves ===
- A rook moves edgewise only.
- A bishop moves pointwise. It can also move one step edgewise. (Note: "A necessary perk otherwise the two bishops would be restricted to four spaces.")
- The queen moves as a rook and bishop.
- The king moves one step edgewise or pointwise. There is no castling in rhombic chess.
- A knight moves in the pattern: one step edgewise followed by one step pointwise (or vice versa), away from its starting cell. Like a standard chess knight, it leaps any intervening men.
- A pawn moves forward one step edgewise, with the option of two steps on its first move. A pawn captures the same as it moves. There is no en passant in rhombic chess. A pawn promotes to any piece other than king when reaching rank i (for White) and rank c (for Black). (Note: "Pawns [...] promote on the array spaces of opponent's pawns; thus they travel the same distance as in orthochess.")

== Parachess ==
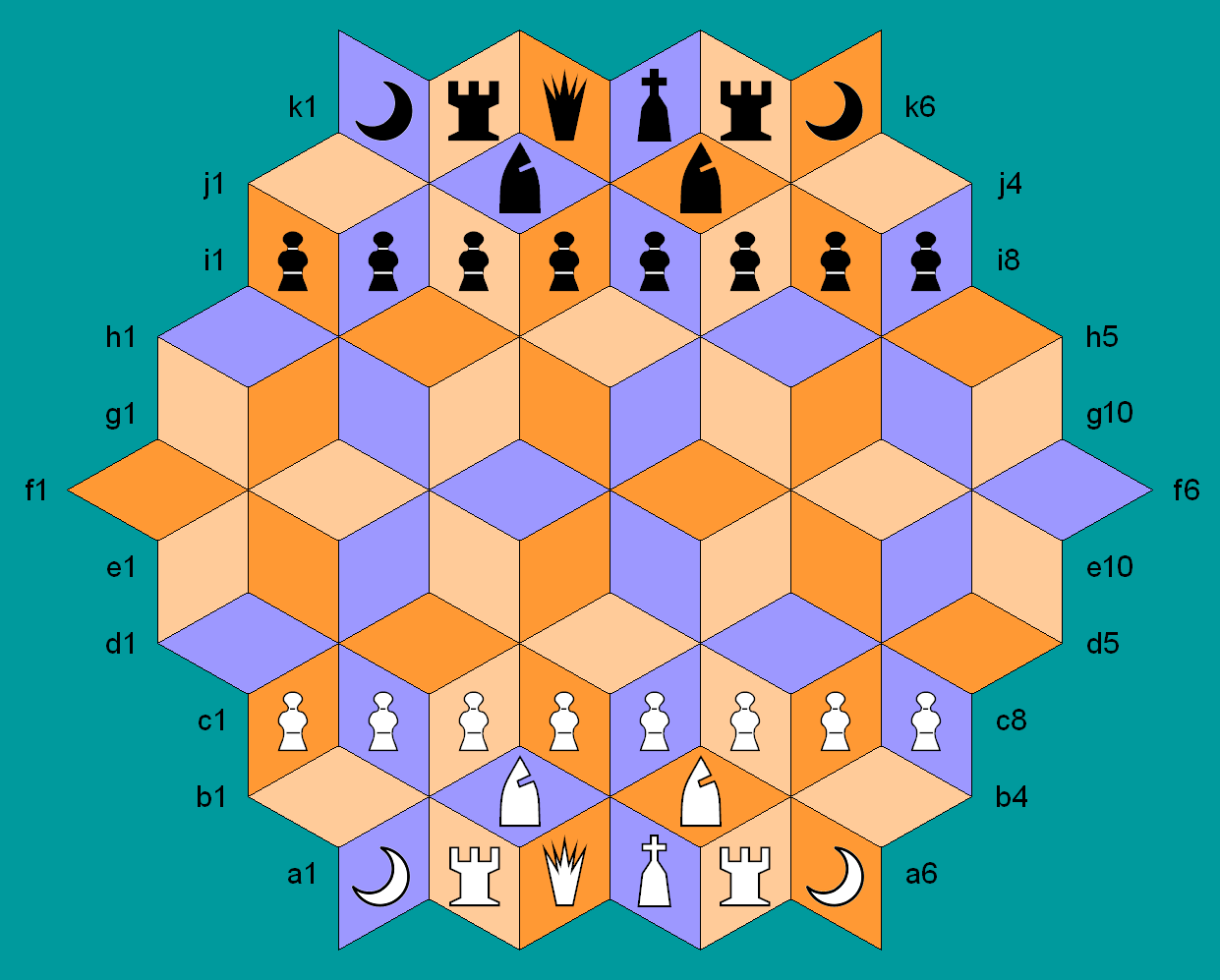
Parachess starting setup. Each army includes two sorcerers. Cell colors highlight arcwise and wavepath movements.

Circa 2000, Paletta created Parachess (Note: From "parallelogram" + "chess". (Paletta)) using the same board geometry but introducing additional ways to move:

- An arcwise step—through the sharpest corner of a cell, to a cell not connected to the starting cell edgewise or pointwise.
- A wavepath move—a series of arcwise steps, with each step in the opposite direction of the preceding step.

These ways to move are highlighted on the board by same-colored cells.

=== Piece moves ===
- A rook moves edgewise only (as in rhombic chess).
- A bishop moves pointwise (as in rhombic chess) or along a wavepath.
- The queen moves as a rook and bishop.
- The king moves one step edgewise, pointwise, or arcwise. As in rhombic chess, there is no castling.
- The sorcerer moves in the pattern: one step pointwise, followed by one step edgewise or arcwise, or vice versa. It leaps any intervening men.
- A pawn moves forward one step edgewise, pointwise, or arcwise; there is no initial two-step option. A pawn captures forward one step edgewise or pointwise. There is no en passant. A pawn must reach the opponent's furthest rank in order to promote.
