= Superchess =

Multiple-player chess game

Superchess is a multi-player chess variant published by Green Island Games in 1992.

| | a | b | c | d | e | f | g | h | i | j | k | l | m | n |
|---|---|---|---|---|---|---|---|---|---|---|---|---|---|---|---|
| 14 | a14 w w | b14 w w | c14 w w | d14 white rook | e14 white pawn | f14 | g14 | h14 | i14 | j14 black pawn | k14 black rook | l14 w w | m14 w w | n14 w w | 14 |
| 13 | a13 w w | b13 w w | c13 w w | d13 white knight | e13 white pawn | f13 | g13 | h13 | i13 | j13 black pawn | k13 black knight | l13 w w | m13 w w | n13 w w | 13 |
| 12 | a12 w w | b12 w w | c12 white king | d12 white bishop | e12 white pawn | f12 | g12 | h12 | i12 | j12 black pawn | k12 black bishop | l12 black king | m12 w w | n12 w w | 12 |
| 11 | a11 white rook | b11 white knight | c11 white bishop | d11 white queen | e11 white pawn | f11 | g11 | h11 | i11 | j11 black pawn | k11 black queen | l11 black bishop | m11 black knight | n11 black rook | 11 |
| 10 | a10 white pawn | b10 white pawn | c10 white pawn | d10 white pawn | e10 white pawn | f10 | g10 | h10 | i10 | j10 black pawn | k10 black pawn | l10 black pawn | m10 black pawn | n10 black pawn | 10 |
| 9 | a9 | b9 | c9 | d9 | e9 | f9 w w | g9 w w | h9 w w | i9 w w | j9 | k9 | l9 | m9 | n9 | 9 |
| 8 | a8 | b8 | c8 | d8 | e8 | f8 w w | g8 w w | h8 w w | i8 w w | j8 | k8 | l8 | m8 | n8 | 8 |
| 7 | a7 | b7 | c7 | d7 | e7 | f7 w w | g7 w w | h7 w w | i7 w w | j7 | k7 | l7 | m7 | n7 | 7 |
| 6 | a6 | b6 | c6 | d6 | e6 | f6 w w | g6 w w | h6 w w | i6 w w | j6 | k6 | l6 | m6 | n6 | 6 |
| 5 | a5 p r | b5 p r | c5 p r | d5 p r | e5 p r | f5 | g5 | h5 | i5 | j5 p y | k5 p y | l5 p y | m5 p y | n5 p y | 5 |
| 4 | a4 r r | b4 n r | c4 b r | d4 q r | e4 p r | f4 | g4 | h4 | i4 | j4 p y | k4 q y | l4 b y | m4 n y | n4 r y | 4 |
| 3 | a3 w w | b3 w w | c3 k r | d3 b r | e3 p r | f3 | g3 | h3 | i3 | j3 p y | k3 b y | l3 k y | m3 w w | n3 w w | 3 |
| 2 | a2 w w | b2 w w | c2 w w | d2 n r | e2 p r | f2 | g2 | h2 | i2 | j2 p y | k2 n y | l2 w w | m2 w w | n2 w w | 2 |
| 1 | a1 w w | b1 w w | c1 w w | d1 r r | e1 p r | f1 | g1 | h1 | i1 | j1 p y | k1 r y | l1 w w | m1 w w | n1 w w | 1 |
| | a | b | c | d | e | f | g | h | i | j | k | l | m | n |

Diamond-shaped board and starting position of Superchess. Note the "point pawns" at the head of each team can move either left or right on their opening move. in this diagram white and yellow are a team and black and red are a team

== Description ==
Superchess is a chess variant for up to four players. As in bridge, four players are divided into two teams, in this case white and tan versus black and brown. In two- or three-player games, players play individually.

Each player has a standard 16 chess pieces plus an extra pawn. The board, a vinyl mat, is diamond-shaped, with an empty space in the middle which cannot be entered by any piece. (Knights may move over the blank space as long as their starting and ending positions are on the play area of the board.) Each player sets up their pieces in a corner of the diamond. The moves in the basic game are made according to standard chess, with the exception of the "point pawns" at the head of each team — because these pawns cannot move straight ahead, the player can choose to move them left or right on their first move. Thereafter the pawn must continue in this direction only (excepting that it still captures on the diagonal).

The white player starts first, and play moves around the board in a clockwise direction. The first team to checkmate both opposing kings is the winner.

A twenty-page rulebook contains the basic as well as variant rules.

== Publication history ==
Superchess was designed by Rolf W. Jacobson, and was published by Green Island Games in 1992. Although it was reported that the company was working on Superchess II that would feature a larger board, it was never published.

== Reception ==
In Issue 12 of Shadis, Scott Johnson noted that with an infinite number of moves as well as variant rules, "Superchess has unlimited possibilities." Johnson concluded, "If you love chess, it's a given that you will fall in love with Superchess."

In Issue 52 of White Wolf Inphobia, Tony Lee stated that "Superchess is a good catch, especially considering the price of a decent chess set these days (and Superchess' vinyl board is definitely more manageable than a clunky wood or marble one)." Lee concluded by giving this game a rating of 4 out of 5.
