= Chess on a really big board =

Chess variant

	a	b	c	d	e	f	g	h	i	j	k	l	m	n	o	p
16	a16 black rook	b16 black knight	c16 black wizard	d16 black champion	e16 black bishop	f16 black upside-down knight	g16 black princess	h16 black queen	i16 black king	j16 black empress	k16 black fool	l16 black bishop	m16 black champion	n16 black wizard	o16 black knight	p16 black rook	16
15	a15 black pawn	b15 black pawn	c15 black pawn	d15 black pawn	e15 black pawn	f15 black pawn	g15 black pawn	h15 black pawn	i15 black pawn	j15 black pawn	k15 black pawn	l15 black pawn	m15 black pawn	n15 black pawn	o15 black pawn	p15 black pawn	15
14	a14	b14	c14	d14	e14	f14	g14	h14	i14	j14	k14	l14	m14	n14	o14	p14	14
13	a13	b13	c13	d13	e13	f13	g13	h13	i13	j13	k13	l13	m13	n13	o13	p13	13
12	a12	b12	c12	d12	e12	f12	g12	h12	i12	j12	k12	l12	m12	n12	o12	p12	12
11	a11	b11	c11	d11	e11	f11	g11	h11	i11	j11	k11	l11	m11	n11	o11	p11	11
10	a10	b10	c10	d10	e10	f10	g10	h10	i10	j10	k10	l10	m10	n10	o10	p10	10
9	a9	b9	c9	d9	e9	f9	g9	h9	i9	j9	k9	l9	m9	n9	o9	p9	9
8	a8	b8	c8	d8	e8	f8	g8	h8	i8	j8	k8	l8	m8	n8	o8	p8	8
7	a7	b7	c7	d7	e7	f7	g7	h7	i7	j7	k7	l7	m7	n7	o7	p7	7
6	a6	b6	c6	d6	e6	f6	g6	h6	i6	j6	k6	l6	m6	n6	o6	p6	6
5	a5	b5	c5	d5	e5	f5	g5	h5	i5	j5	k5	l5	m5	n5	o5	p5	5
4	a4	b4	c4	d4	e4	f4	g4	h4	i4	j4	k4	l4	m4	n4	o4	p4	4
3	a3	b3	c3	d3	e3	f3	g3	h3	i3	j3	k3	l3	m3	n3	o3	p3	3
2	a2 white pawn	b2 white pawn	c2 white pawn	d2 white pawn	e2 white pawn	f2 white pawn	g2 white pawn	h2 white pawn	i2 white pawn	j2 white pawn	k2 white pawn	l2 white pawn	m2 white pawn	n2 white pawn	o2 white pawn	p2 white pawn	2
1	a1 white rook	b1 white knight	c1 white wizard	d1 white champion	e1 white bishop	f1 white upside-down knight	g1 white princess	h1 white queen	i1 white king	j1 white empress	k1 white fool	l1 white bishop	m1 white champion	n1 white wizard	o1 white knight	p1 white rook	1
	a	b	c	d	e	f	g	h	i	j	k	l	m	n	o	p

Chess on a really big board: initial position. As Betza did not specify icons for the unorthodox pieces, instead using letters to represent them in diagrams (as for the standard pieces), some Omega Chess symbols have been used to represent some of the unorthodox piece types, along with some relatively standard icons for the knighted pieces from Capablanca chess, and an inverted knight for the rose.

Chess on a really big board is a large chess variant invented by Ralph Betza around 1996. It is played on a 16×16 chessboard with 16 pieces (on the back rank) and 16 pawns (on the second rank) per player. Since such a board can be constructed by pushing together four standard 8×8 boards, Betza also gave this variant the alternative names of four-board chess or chess on four boards.

== Game description ==
The standard rules of chess apply except in the following cases:

- The game is played on a 16×16 board with the starting position shown above.
- An unmoved pawn can move one step, up to the middle of the board (in the case of the 16×16 board, the eighth rank), or anything in between. Thus, 1.i8 is a legal opening move, and so are 1.i3, 1.i4, 1.i5, 1.i6, and 1.i7. Once it has moved for the first time, it can only make one step at a time. (In the case of an 8×8 board, this is exactly the same as in standard chess). Such a long initial pawn move allows the moving pawn to be captured en passant by an enemy pawn as if it had stopped on any one of the squares it had passed through.
- In castling, the rook moves the same distance as it does in chess. Thus, the king moves further; if it castles kingside, it ends on the second-rightmost file, and if it castles queenside, it ends on the third-leftmost file. On the 16×16 board, 0-0 leaves the rook on the n-file and the king on the o-file, and 0-0-0 leaves the rook on the d-file and the king on the c-file.
- The 50-move rule becomes at least a 100-move rule. Generally, if each of the board's dimensions is multiplied by n, the number of non-capturing or non-pawn moves allowable before draw claims become possible must also be multiplied by at least n.
- There are extra fairy chess pieces that move differently, although the orthodox pieces are retained. Their movements are given below using Ralph Betza's "funny notation". In physical play, these six types of fairy pieces may be represented by pieces from mismatched chess sets. Note that Betza did not specify icons or designs for the fairy pieces for diagrams, instead using letters to represent them: the diagrams here use common renderings for the archbishop and chancellor, an inverted knight for the rose, and Omega Chess pieces for the remaining three fairy piece types.

Position: e6 black cross, d5 black cross, f5 black cross, c4 black cross, e4 white wizard, g4 black cross, d3 black cross, f3 black cross, e2 black cross

FD (single-letter symbol D). Moves as ferz or dabbaba. (This is the kirin from chu shogi and dai shogi.) Can jump for all moves. In his The Encyclopedia of Chess Variants, David Pritchard calls this piece a unicorn.

Position: c6 black cross, g6 black cross, d5 black cross, e5 black cross, f5 black cross, d4 black cross, e4 white champion, f4 black cross, d3 black cross, e3 black cross, f3 black cross, c2 black cross, g2 black cross

WFA (single-letter symbol W). Moves as king or alfil. Can jump for all moves. In his The Encyclopedia of Chess Variants, David Pritchard calls this piece an elephant.

Position: c7 black cross, d7 black cross, f7 black cross, g7 black cross, b6 black cross, d6 black cross, f6 black cross, h6 black cross, b5 black cross, c5 black cross, g5 black cross, h5 black cross, e4 white fool, b3 black cross, c3 black cross, g3 black cross, h3 black cross, b2 black cross, d2 black cross, f2 black cross, h2 black cross, c1 black cross, d1 black cross, f1 black cross, g1 black cross

Superknight (NLJ; single-letter symbol J). Moves as knight, camel, or zebra. Can jump for all moves. Known as the buffalo in the fairy chess tradition.

Position: a8 black cross, b7 black cross, h7 black cross, c6 black cross, d6 black cross, f6 black cross, g6 black cross, c5 black cross, d5 black cross, f5 black cross, g5 black cross, e4 white archbishop, c3 black cross, d3 black cross, f3 black cross, g3 black cross, c2 black cross, d2 black cross, f2 black cross, g2 black cross, b1 black cross, h1 black cross

Archbishop (NB; single-letter symbol A). Moves as bishop or knight. Can jump for knight moves. Known as the princess in the fairy chess tradition.

Position: e8 black cross, e7 black cross, d6 black cross, e6 black cross, f6 black cross, c5 black cross, e5 black cross, g5 black cross, a4 black cross, b4 black cross, c4 black cross, d4 black cross, e4 white chancellor, f4 black cross, g4 black cross, h4 black cross, c3 black cross, e3 black cross, g3 black cross, d2 black cross, e2 black cross, f2 black cross, e1 black cross

Chancellor (RN; single-letter symbol C). Moves as rook or knight. Can jump for knight moves. Known as the empress in the fairy chess tradition.

	a	b	c	d	e	f	g	h	i	j	k	l	m	n	o	p
16	a16	b16	c16	d16	e16	f16	g16	h16	i16	j16	k16	l16	m16	n16	o16	p16	16
15	a15	b15	c15	d15	e15	f15	g15	h15	i15	j15	k15	l15	m15	n15	o15	p15	15
14	a14	b14	c14	d14	e14	f14	g14	h14	i14 four	j14	k14	l14	m14	n14	o14	p14	14
13	a13	b13	c13	d13	e13	f13	g13 three	h13	i13	j13	k13 three	l13	m13	n13	o13	p13	13
12	a12	b12	c12	d12	e12 four	f12	g12	h12	i12 two	j12	k12	l12	m12 four	n12	o12	p12	12
11	a11	b11	c11	d11	e11	f11 two	g11	h11	i11	j11	k11	l11 two	m11	n11	o11	p11	11
10	a10	b10	c10	d10 three	e10	f10	g10	h10 one	i10	j10 one	k10	l10	m10	n10 three	o10	p10	10
9	a9	b9	c9	d9	e9	f9	g9 one	h9	i9	j9	k9 one	l9	m9	n9	o9	p9	9
8	a8	b8	c8 four	d8	e8 two	f8	g8	h8	i8 white upside-down knight	j8	k8	l8	m8 two	n8	o8 four	p8	8
7	a7	b7	c7	d7	e7	f7	g7 one	h7	i7	j7	k7 one	l7	m7	n7	o7	p7	7
6	a6	b6	c6	d6 three	e6	f6	g6	h6 one	i6	j6 one	k6	l6	m6	n6 three	o6	p6	6
5	a5	b5	c5	d5	e5	f5 two	g5	h5	i5	j5	k5	l5 two	m5	n5	o5	p5	5
4	a4	b4	c4	d4	e4 four	f4	g4	h4	i4 two	j4	k4	l4	m4 four	n4	o4	p4	4
3	a3	b3	c3	d3	e3	f3	g3 three	h3	i3	j3	k3 three	l3	m3	n3	o3	p3	3
2	a2	b2	c2	d2	e2	f2	g2	h2	i2 four	j2	k2	l2	m2	n2	o2	p2	2
1	a1	b1	c1	d1	e1	f1	g1	h1	i1	j1	k1	l1	m1	n1	o1	p1	1
	a	b	c	d	e	f	g	h	i	j	k	l	m	n	o	p

Rose (qN; single-letter symbol O). Makes any number of consecutive knight moves on an octagonal (almost circular) path. It may move either clockwise or counterclockwise: going along a sequence of numbers 1-2-3-4-3-2-1 in a circle on the diagram demonstrates one possible move of the rose. For example, it may travel along the following path: i8–g9–e8–d6–e4–g3–i4–j6–i8. It may jump over pieces in each of its individual knight moves, but is blocked by pieces on its circular path (though it may capture an enemy piece thus placed).
By going all the way around a circle, it is allowed to return to its starting position. Thus a player with an unblocked rose may pass their turn.
The rose was invented in 1968 by Robert Meignant for chess problems.

Betza included the rose in his initial setup because it is a piece especially suited for a large board: it cannot display its full power on boards smaller than 13×13. Furthermore, its already large move still cannot reach all the way across the board, contributing to the large feeling of the game along with the ability of the riders to attack from a large distance away.

== History ==
Chess on a really big board was created as an outgrowth of Betza's ideas on three-dimensional chess, after he noted that an 8×8×8 board for 3D chess would have 512 spaces, more than any large version of chess that had previously been invented; he then considered two-dimensional very large (or, in his word, "huge") chess games, mainly on the 16×16 board because such a board requires no non-standard equipment to construct, and while much larger than the 8×8 board, it was not so big as to make an unplayable game. This idea eventually came full circle in the development of the 16×16×16 three-dimensional version of chess on a really big board, which he called "impossibly large".

== Gameplay ==
Betza described his choice of pieces as "a very basic and logical selection of the fundamental geometrical moves, except for my idiosyncratic insistence on including the Rose in the lineup of pieces. These are largely the basic units of chess, and anybody who designs a [16×16] game with 32 pieces is bound to come up with something reasonably similar, at least if they want it to be like chess but a bit less tactical." In fact, his original plan was to include the WA along with the complementary FD, but this leaves the c- and n-pawns undefended in the initial position. His final assessment was that the game was "rather chesslike".

Betza divided the pieces into three classes: seven long-range pieces (the rooks, bishops, queen, archbishop, and chancellor), two mid-range pieces (the rose and superknight), and six short-range pieces (the knights, FDs, and WFAs). He opined that the short-range pieces, though the weakest, were crucial as they take time to get into the action, but are very important for opening up specific lines for attacks.

=== Sample opening phase of a game ===
	a	b	c	d	e	f	g	h	i	j	k	l	m	n	o	p
16	a16 black rook	b16 black knight	c16 black wizard	d16 black champion	e16 black bishop	f16	g16	h16	i16 black king	j16 black empress	k16	l16 black bishop	m16 black champion	n16 black wizard	o16 black knight	p16 black rook	16
15	a15 black pawn	b15 black pawn	c15 black pawn	d15 black pawn	e15 black pawn	f15 black pawn	g15 black pawn	h15	i15	j15 black pawn	k15 black pawn	l15 black pawn	m15 black pawn	n15 black pawn	o15 black pawn	p15 black pawn	15
14	a14	b14	c14	d14	e14	f14	g14	h14	i14	j14	k14	l14	m14	n14	o14	p14	14
13	a13	b13	c13	d13	e13	f13	g13	h13	i13 black fool	j13	k13	l13	m13	n13	o13	p13	13
12	a12	b12	c12	d12	e12	f12	g12	h12	i12	j12	k12	l12 black queen	m12	n12	o12	p12	12
11	a11	b11	c11	d11	e11	f11	g11	h11 black upside-down knight	i11	j11	k11	l11	m11	n11	o11	p11	11
10	a10	b10	c10	d10	e10	f10	g10	h10 black pawn	i10	j10	k10	l10	m10	n10	o10	p10	10
9	a9	b9	c9	d9	e9	f9	g9	h9	i9 black pawn	j9	k9	l9	m9	n9	o9	p9	9
8	a8	b8	c8	d8	e8	f8	g8	h8	i8 white pawn	j8 white pawn	k8 black princess	l8	m8	n8	o8	p8 white pawn	8
7	a7	b7	c7	d7	e7	f7	g7	h7	i7	j7	k7	l7	m7	n7	o7	p7	7
6	a6	b6	c6	d6	e6	f6	g6	h6 white fool	i6	j6	k6	l6	m6	n6	o6	p6	6
5	a5	b5	c5	d5	e5	f5	g5	h5	i5	j5	k5	l5	m5	n5	o5	p5	5
4	a4	b4	c4	d4	e4	f4	g4	h4	i4	j4	k4	l4	m4	n4	o4	p4	4
3	a3	b3	c3	d3	e3	f3	g3	h3	i3	j3	k3	l3	m3	n3	o3 white queen	p3	3
2	a2 white pawn	b2 white pawn	c2 white pawn	d2 white pawn	e2 white pawn	f2 white pawn	g2 white pawn	h2 white pawn	i2	j2	k2 white pawn	l2 white pawn	m2 white pawn	n2 white pawn	o2 white pawn	p2	2
1	a1 white rook	b1 white knight	c1 white wizard	d1 white champion	e1 white bishop	f1 white upside-down knight	g1 white princess	h1	i1 white king	j1 white empress	k1	l1 white bishop	m1 white champion	n1 white wizard	o1 white knight	p1 white rook	1
	a	b	c	d	e	f	g	h	i	j	k	l	m	n	o	p

Position after 9...Ql12

The following sample game fragment was constructed by Betza.

1.i8 i9
2.Qp9

The 16×16 analogue to the Wayward Queen Attack (in orthodox chess, 1.e4 e5 2.Qh5). On such a large board, this opening move becomes much sounder, as it is more difficult to attack the queen, and from this position it bears down onto the centre from a long distance.

2...h10
3.j8 Oh11

Black defends his i-pawn; White attacks it again (her j-pawn being defended by the chancellor on j1); Black defends it again, moving his rose from f16 via e14 and f12 to h11, where it defends the pawn on i9. Trading pawns would be disadvantageous and lead to the loss of a tempo by the initiator, but at some point White's chancellor must be developed.

Currently, White has no immediate threats. Attacks on Black's h-pawn with Bb4 (moving the d-pawn away first), or his rose with Bo4 (moving the m-pawn away first) are easy to counter. Hence she decides to bring a short-range piece to attack, though this will take several turns.

4.Ji4 Ai15
5.Jh6 Ak14

Attacking White's queen.

6.Qp10 Ji13
7.p8!?

Threatening to lift the king's rook to the h-file to contest the centre.

7...An11!?

Continuing to attack White's queen. This region could also be used as an advanced base: the n11 square can easily be defended by the rose or the m-pawn, and a natural follow-up would be 8...Qn10.

8.Ql6 Ak8

The White queen retreats and attacks the Black i-pawn again, but Black defends the pawn with the archbishop while attacking the queen again. The archbishop itself, though attacked by White's superknight, is protected by Black's rose.

9.Qo3

If 9.Qk7, then 9...Al9 may win a pawn.

9...Ql12

Threatening 10...Al6.

=== Sample games ===
	a	b	c	d	e	f	g	h	i	j	k	l	m	n	o	p
16	a16 black rook	b16	c16	d16	e16	f16	g16	h16	i16	j16	k16	l16	m16	n16 black rook	o16 black king	p16	16
15	a15	b15 black pawn	c15 black pawn	d15	e15	f15	g15	h15	i15	j15	k15	l15 black empress	m15 black pawn	n15 black pawn	o15 black pawn	p15 black pawn	15
14	a14	b14	c14	d14	e14 black pawn	f14	g14	h14	i14	j14	k14	l14	m14	n14	o14	p14	14
13	a13	b13	c13	d13 black pawn	e13	f13 black pawn	g13 black pawn	h13	i13 black upside-down knight	j13	k13	l13	m13	n13	o13	p13	13
12	a12	b12	c12 black queen	d12	e12 black wizard	f12	g12 black knight	h12 black pawn	i12 black champion	j12	k12	l12	m12 black knight	n12	o12	p12	12
11	a11	b11	c11	d11	e11	f11	g11	h11	i11 black pawn	j11	k11	l11	m11	n11	o11	p11	11
10	a10	b10	c10	d10	e10	f10	g10	h10	i10	j10 black pawn	k10	l10 black champion	m10	n10	o10	p10	10
9	a9 black pawn	b9	c9	d9	e9	f9	g9	h9	i9	j9	k9 black pawn	l9	m9 black wizard	n9	o9	p9	9
8	a8	b8	c8	d8	e8	f8	g8	h8	i8 white pawn	j8	k8	l8 black pawn	m8	n8	o8	p8	8
7	a7	b7	c7	d7	e7	f7 white pawn	g7	h7 white knight	i7	j7 white pawn	k7	l7	m7	n7	o7	p7	7
6	a6	b6	c6	d6	e6	f6	g6	h6 white knight	i6 white champion	j6	k6 white pawn	l6	m6	n6	o6 black princess	p6	6
5	a5	b5	c5	d5	e5	f5	g5 white wizard	h5 white princess	i5	j5	k5	l5 white pawn	m5	n5	o5	p5	5
4	a4	b4	c4 white pawn	d4	e4	f4	g4	h4	i4 white fool	j4	k4	l4	m4 white pawn	n4	o4	p4	4
3	a3	b3 white pawn	c3	d3	e3	f3	g3	h3	i3 white pawn	j3	k3 white champion	l3 white wizard	m3	n3	o3 white pawn	p3	3
2	a2 white pawn	b2	c2	d2	e2	f2 white pawn	g2 white pawn	h2 white queen	i2	j2 white king	k2	l2	m2	n2	o2	p2 white pawn	2
1	a1	b1	c1	d1 white rook	e1	f1	g1	h1	i1	j1	k1	l1	m1 white rook	n1	o1	p1	1
	a	b	c	d	e	f	g	h	i	j	k	l	m	n	o	p

Final position of game 1 after 53.Kj2

The following are some of the only complete games of chess on a really big board played on The Chess Variant Pages, and are not intended as representative examples of good play.

Game 1
White: John Davis Black: Georg Spengler
Game Courier 2015

1.i8 k9 2.j7 Bd8 3.Ji4 Wk14 4.k6 j10 5.d5 Nn14 6.Of7 Ba11 7.Ci3 Bxi3 8.hxi3 l10 9.Wk3 Nm12 10.Ba15 Wf14 11.Wd3 g13 12.De1 h12 13.e6 Dn14 14.l5 Wf12 15.Nd2 Jj13 16.m4 Cl15 17.Bp5 f13 18.n7 Nc14 19.Bo6 Bg14 20.Bp7 Bn7 21.Bxj13 Ax13 22.Jl6 Ai12 23.Dm2 0-0 24.De3 Ag14 25.Nf1 i11 26.Dg3 Wh10 27.Ah3 Wj8 28.Ji4 Ne13 29.Wh5 Dc14 30.Dk2 e14 31.Nm2 Ng12 32.Nl4 Oi13 33.Nj5 Dd13 34.Nh6 De12 35.Dg5 Bj11 36.Ne3 Bxf7 37.exf7 Qa9+ 38.Qh2 Qxa5 39.Nc4 Qxd5 40.b3 d13 41.Af4 Qd12 42.Wi6 Ao6 43.Dl3 An4 44.o3 Ao6 45.Ah5 Wi12 46.Rd1 Qc12 47.Rm1 Dn12 48.Ne3 Dn10 49.c4 a9 50.Neg4 Dm9 51.Ni5 l8 (Note: This move is illegal: the Black l-pawn has already moved (at 8...l10), and so it can now only move one square forward at a time. However, this was not pointed out, and hence the move stood.) 52.Nh7 Wl10 53.Kj2 1–0

Game 2
White: sxg Black: Nick Wolff
Game Courier 2017

1.f8 i9 2.Ci3 Ci14 3.k8 h10 4.Bc10+ g14 5.g8 Qc11 6.Bd9 Cl14 7.Qa8 An9 8.Ok3 Of10 9.Bi4 Axi4 10.Oxi4 Oxa8 11.g9 h9 12.Bm9 j10 13.Jl4 Jm13 14.Jk7 Jl11 15.l8 k11 16.Jxh9 Oc7 17.Jf12 Of4+ 18.Kj1 Qxf8 19.Aa7 Qxm1+ 20.Dl1 Jxm9 21.lxm9 Cl1+ 0–1

Mate is inevitable.

=== Endgame ===
The standard basic checkmates (queen, rook, two bishops, or bishop and knight) can all be forced on the 16×16 board, but they take a longer time to accomplish. For example, while bishop and knight can mate within 33 moves from any winnable position on an 8×8 board, it can take up to 93 moves on a 16×16 board. For example, if White has a king on a1, a knight on b1, and a bishop on c1, while Black has only a king on c2, White can force mate in 92:

1.Bb2 Kb3 2.Bi9 Ka4 3.Kb2 Kb5 4.Kc3 Kc6 5.Kd4 Kd7 6.Ke5 Ke8 7.Kf6 Kf8 8.Kg6 Kg8 9.Bg11 Kf9 10.Kh7 Ke10 11.Kg8 Kf11 12.Bi9 Ke10 13.Kh9 Kd11 14.Kg10 Ke10 15.Bg11 Kd9 16.Kf9 Kc10 17.Ke10 Kc11 18.Ke11 Kc12 19.Nd2 Kd13 20.Ne4 Ke14 21.Nf6 Kf13 22.Kf11 Ke14 23.Ke12 Kd15 24.Kd13 Ke16 25.Ke14 Kd16 26.Nd7 Kc16 27.Ne9 Kb15 28.Kd15 Kb14 29.Bf10+ Kb15 30.Nd11 Ka16 31.Nc13 Kb16 32.Kd16 Ka15 33.Kc15 Ka16 34.Kc16 Ka15 35.Na12+ Ka16 36.Nb14 Ka15 37.Nd13 Ka14 38.Nc11 Ka13 39.Bc13 Ka14 40.Kc15 Ka13 41.Kc14 Ka14 42.Bd12 Ka13 43.Na10 Ka12 44.Kc13 Kb11 45.Nb12 Ka12 46.Kc12 Ka13 47.Be11 Ka12 48.Bf12 Ka13 49.Bc15 Ka12 50.Nd11 Ka11 51.Bf12 Ka12 52.Nc13 Ka11 53.Kc11 Ka10 54.Nd11 Ka9 55.Nb10 Kb9 56.Kb11 Ka9 57.Kc10 Ka10 58.Bg13 Ka11 59.Be15 Ka10 60.Nd9 Ka9 61.Bh12 Ka10 62.Nc11+ Ka9 63.Kc9 Ka8 64.Nd9 Kb7 65.Nb8 Ka7 66.Kc8 Ka8 67.Bg11 Ka9 68.Be13+ Ka8 69.Nd7 Ka7 70.Bh10 Ka8 71.Nc9 Ka7 72.Kc7 Ka6 73.Kc6 Ka7 74.Bd6 Ka6 75.Bc5 Ka5 76.Ne8 Ka4 77.Kd5 Kb3 78.Kd4 Kc2 79.Bb4 Kb3 80.Kc5 Ka2 81.Kc4 Kb1 82.Kc3 Kc1 83.Nd6 Kd1 84.Kd3 Kc1 85.Nc4 Kd1 86.Ba5 Kc1 87.Bd2 Kb1 88.Kc3 Ka2 89.Kc2 Ka1 90.Kb3 Kb1 91.Na3+ Ka1 92.Bc3#

In fact, the king, bishop, and knight can force checkmate on the lone enemy king on an arbitrary large chessboard, provided that it has a corner on the colour that the bishop travels on. This was shown by Julius Telesin in 1983.

A single archbishop, chancellor, WFA, or superknight (but not rose) can also force checkmate. Two FDs on different colours can force checkmate without their king's help.

The endgame of queen versus rook is drawn on the 16×16 board. (In fact, it is generally won only on 5×5 through 15×15 square boards.)

== Sub-variants ==
=== Golden age chess on a really big board ===
	a	b	c	d	e	f	g	h	i	j	k	l	m	n	o	p
16	a16 black rook	b16 black upside-down knight	c16 black bishop	d16 black fool	e16 black knight	f16 black princess	g16 black upside-down queen	h16 black upside-down rook	i16 black king	j16 black upside-down queen	k16 black princess	l16 black knight	m16 black fool	n16 black bishop	o16 black upside-down knight	p16 black rook	16
15	a15 black pawn	b15 black pawn	c15 black pawn	d15 black pawn	e15 black pawn	f15 black pawn	g15 black pawn	h15 black pawn	i15 black pawn	j15 black pawn	k15 black pawn	l15 black pawn	m15 black pawn	n15 black pawn	o15 black pawn	p15 black pawn	15
14	a14	b14	c14	d14	e14	f14	g14	h14	i14	j14	k14	l14	m14	n14	o14	p14	14
13	a13	b13	c13	d13	e13	f13	g13	h13	i13	j13	k13	l13	m13	n13	o13	p13	13
12	a12	b12	c12	d12	e12	f12	g12	h12	i12	j12	k12	l12	m12	n12	o12	p12	12
11	a11	b11	c11	d11	e11	f11	g11	h11	i11	j11	k11	l11	m11	n11	o11	p11	11
10	a10	b10	c10	d10	e10	f10	g10	h10	i10	j10	k10	l10	m10	n10	o10	p10	10
9	a9	b9	c9	d9	e9	f9	g9	h9	i9	j9	k9	l9	m9	n9	o9	p9	9
8	a8	b8	c8	d8	e8	f8	g8	h8	i8	j8	k8	l8	m8	n8	o8	p8	8
7	a7	b7	c7	d7	e7	f7	g7	h7	i7	j7	k7	l7	m7	n7	o7	p7	7
6	a6	b6	c6	d6	e6	f6	g6	h6	i6	j6	k6	l6	m6	n6	o6	p6	6
5	a5	b5	c5	d5	e5	f5	g5	h5	i5	j5	k5	l5	m5	n5	o5	p5	5
4	a4	b4	c4	d4	e4	f4	g4	h4	i4	j4	k4	l4	m4	n4	o4	p4	4
3	a3	b3	c3	d3	e3	f3	g3	h3	i3	j3	k3	l3	m3	n3	o3	p3	3
2	a2 white pawn	b2 white pawn	c2 white pawn	d2 white pawn	e2 white pawn	f2 white pawn	g2 white pawn	h2 white pawn	i2 white pawn	j2 white pawn	k2 white pawn	l2 white pawn	m2 white pawn	n2 white pawn	o2 white pawn	p2 white pawn	2
1	a1 white rook	b1 white upside-down knight	c1 white bishop	d1 white fool	e1 white knight	f1 white princess	g1 white upside-down queen	h1 white upside-down rook	i1 white king	j1 white upside-down queen	k1 white princess	l1 white knight	m1 white fool	n1 white bishop	o1 white upside-down knight	p1 white rook	1
	a	b	c	d	e	f	g	h	i	j	k	l	m	n	o	p

Golden age chess on a really big board: initial position. (Note that the piece shapes in the diagram do not always correspond to their meaning in chess on a really big board.)

Betza also created a second 16×16 variant, which he termed golden age chess on a really big board. He wrote: "This game is designed to create an open position in which development, initiative, and attack are all-important, the positions are too complex to calculate so you must play by intuition, and you never count Pawns -- in other words, a return to the Golden Age!"

The inverted knight in the diagram is the rose from chess on a really big board, and the superknight and archbishop remain the same. The other pieces are as follows:

Position: e8 black cross, e6 black cross, e5 black cross, a4 black cross, c4 black cross, d4 black cross, e4 white rook, f4 black cross, g4 black cross, e3 black cross, e2 black cross

Skipping rook (WDD; single-letter symbol W). Moves as wazir or dabbaba-rider: in other words, a rook that skips every other square on its path and cannot be blocked there, or moves just one square. Betza called this piece a "skipping rook".

Position: e8 black cross, d7 black cross, f7 black cross, e6 black cross, b5 black cross, d5 black cross, f5 black cross, h5 black cross, a4 black cross, c4 black cross, e4 white bishop, g4 black cross, b3 black cross, d3 black cross, f3 black cross, h3 black cross, e2 black cross, d1 black cross, f1 black cross

Crooked bishop (zB; single-letter symbol B). This piece was the original inspiration for this game. It makes a 90° turn at each step and always moves away from its original position. Thus it could move from e4 to d5 to e6 to d7 to e8. It was previously invented by J. de A. Almay in the early 20th century as the boyscout, along with the girlscout, which moves as a crooked rook (e.g. from a1 to a2 to b2 to b3 to c3).

Position: c8 black cross, g8 black cross, a6 black cross, d6 black cross, f6 black cross, c5 black cross, g5 black cross, e4 white knight, c3 black cross, g3 black cross, a2 black cross, d2 black cross, f2 black cross

Nightrider (NN; single-letter symbol N). Makes any number of knight moves in the same direction. The nightrider is to the knight as the queen is to the king.

Position: b7 black cross, e7 black cross, h7 black cross, e6 black cross, d5 black cross, f5 black cross, b4 black cross, c4 black cross, e4 white upside-down queen, g4 black cross, h4 black cross, d3 black cross, f3 black cross, e2 black cross, b1 black cross, e1 black cross, h1 black cross

GHFD (single-letter symbol H). Moves as threeleaper, tripper, ferz, or dabbaba. Can jump for all moves.

Position: d8 black cross, f8 black cross, d7 black cross, f7 black cross, d6 black cross, f6 black cross, a5 black cross, b5 black cross, c5 black cross, d5 black cross, f5 black cross, g5 black cross, h5 black cross, e4 white upside-down rook, a3 black cross, b3 black cross, c3 black cross, d3 black cross, f3 black cross, g3 black cross, h3 black cross, d2 black cross, f2 black cross, d1 black cross, f1 black cross

Gryphon (t[FR]; single-letter symbol R). Moves one step as a ferz, then continues outward as a rook.

The shortest possible checkmate is:

1.Wa13 i9 2.Wi13 Ai15 3.Wi12#

The shortest game ending in quadruple check and mate is:

1.Wa3 Np8 2.Wi3 Nxm2 3.Al3 Nk1 4.Bn5 Nxi2 5.Rxi2 i9 6.Rh3 i8 7.Bh5 i7 8.Wi2+ i6 9.Axi6 h14 10.Ad11#

=== Nine-board chess ===
Betza also proposed a 24×24 version of chess on a really big board, although he did not fully design it. His description of the game was "Push 9 boards together in a [3×3] square, symmetrically replicate all the unique pieces from the four-board chess lineup, add a W beside the K, two Fs flanking the K [and] W, and you have a game." The W and F are here the wazir and ferz. This description is however not unique: the positions of the roses, superknights, archbishops, chancellors, and queens are not determined, as some of them are equidistant to the king in the four-board chess initial position, and it is not clear if the king should be on the l-file or the m-file. The addition of such weak pieces was intended to balance the duplication of the more powerful pieces.

=== Four-board Shatranj ===
Betza also suggested a version with even fewer tactics that would eliminate many of the riders, replacing bishops with alfils and queens with ferzes, turning archbishops into knight-alfil compounds, and turning chancellors into either rook-alfil or rook-ferz compounds.

=== Rule changes ===
Betza remarked that the rules of most chess variants, such as cylindrical chess or avalanche chess, could be applied to chess on a really big board; nonetheless, he considered applying the rules of cylindrical chess to the 16×16 board "silly" because it made distances feel even larger, recommending Avalanche chess instead as it shortens the game. Betza also thought favourably of applying the rules of momentum chess to the 16×16 board. Another possibility Betza mentioned is the rules of Viennese Kriegspiel, where the middle of the board (the line between the 8th and 9th ranks) is blocked by a screen and players can move their pieces freely up to their first six ranks. Once both players are satisfied with their arrangement (this can be enforced with a timer), the screen is removed and normal play resumes. It would also be possible to play without the screen, which Betza called "Sighted Viennese Kriegspiel".

A further possibility Betza entertained was a 3D version of chess on a really big board on a 16×16×16 board, which brought its inspiration full circle. On each level, the 2D setup would be repeated, and the pieces' moves would be translated into three dimensions just as in his idea of 8×8×8 3D chess. Nevertheless, he commented on it: "What an awful idea. Each player has 256 Pawns and 256 pieces. The average length of a game is likely to be more [than] 2000 moves."

=== Different starting positions ===
Betza also considered starting positions with 16 (one chess set) or 64 (four sets) pieces instead of 32 (two sets), but eventually rejected them. They are as follows:

	a	b	c	d	e	f	g	h	i	j	k	l	m	n	o	p
16	a16	b16	c16	d16	e16	f16	g16	h16	i16	j16	k16	l16	m16	n16	o16	p16	16
15	a15	b15	c15	d15	e15	f15	g15	h15	i15	j15	k15	l15	m15	n15	o15	p15	15
14	a14	b14	c14	d14	e14	f14	g14	h14	i14	j14	k14	l14	m14	n14	o14	p14	14
13	a13	b13	c13	d13	e13	f13	g13	h13	i13	j13	k13	l13	m13	n13	o13	p13	13
12	a12	b12	c12	d12	e12 black rook	f12 black knight	g12 black bishop	h12 black queen	i12 black king	j12 black bishop	k12 black knight	l12 black rook	m12	n12	o12	p12	12
11	a11	b11	c11	d11	e11 black pawn	f11 black pawn	g11 black pawn	h11 black pawn	i11 black pawn	j11 black pawn	k11 black pawn	l11 black pawn	m11	n11	o11	p11	11
10	a10	b10	c10	d10	e10	f10	g10	h10	i10	j10	k10	l10	m10	n10	o10	p10	10
9	a9	b9	c9	d9	e9	f9	g9	h9	i9	j9	k9	l9	m9	n9	o9	p9	9
8	a8	b8	c8	d8	e8	f8	g8	h8	i8	j8	k8	l8	m8	n8	o8	p8	8
7	a7	b7	c7	d7	e7	f7	g7	h7	i7	j7	k7	l7	m7	n7	o7	p7	7
6	a6	b6	c6	d6	e6 white pawn	f6 white pawn	g6 white pawn	h6 white pawn	i6 white pawn	j6 white pawn	k6 white pawn	l6 white pawn	m6	n6	o6	p6	6
5	a5	b5	c5	d5	e5 white rook	f5 white knight	g5 white bishop	h5 white queen	i5 white king	j5 white bishop	k5 white knight	l5 white rook	m5	n5	o5	p5	5
4	a4	b4	c4	d4	e4	f4	g4	h4	i4	j4	k4	l4	m4	n4	o4	p4	4
3	a3	b3	c3	d3	e3	f3	g3	h3	i3	j3	k3	l3	m3	n3	o3	p3	3
2	a2	b2	c2	d2	e2	f2	g2	h2	i2	j2	k2	l2	m2	n2	o2	p2	2
1	a1	b1	c1	d1	e1	f1	g1	h1	i1	j1	k1	l1	m1	n1	o1	p1	1
	a	b	c	d	e	f	g	h	i	j	k	l	m	n	o	p

16-piece initial setup, using the traditional 8×8 starting position but positioning it in the middle of the board. This makes it impossible for the kings to achieve safety, shortening the game that would already be shortened from chess on a really big board by the lower number of pieces.

	a	b	c	d	e	f	g	h	i	j	k	l	m	n	o	p
16	a16 black rook	b16 black knight	c16 black bishop	d16 black queen	e16 black king	f16 black bishop	g16 black knight	h16 black rook	i16 black rook	j16 black knight	k16 black bishop	l16 black queen	m16 black king	n16 black bishop	o16 black knight	p16 black rook	16
15	a15 black rook	b15 black knight	c15 black bishop	d15 black queen	e15 black king	f15 black bishop	g15 black knight	h15 black rook	i15 black rook	j15 black knight	k15 black bishop	l15 black queen	m15 black king	n15 black bishop	o15 black knight	p15 black rook	15
14	a14 black pawn	b14 black pawn	c14 black pawn	d14 black pawn	e14 black pawn	f14 black pawn	g14 black pawn	h14 black pawn	i14 black pawn	j14 black pawn	k14 black pawn	l14 black pawn	m14 black pawn	n14 black pawn	o14 black pawn	p14 black pawn	14
13	a13 black pawn	b13 black pawn	c13 black pawn	d13 black pawn	e13 black pawn	f13 black pawn	g13 black pawn	h13 black pawn	i13 black pawn	j13 black pawn	k13 black pawn	l13 black pawn	m13 black pawn	n13 black pawn	o13 black pawn	p13 black pawn	13
12	a12	b12	c12	d12	e12	f12	g12	h12	i12	j12	k12	l12	m12	n12	o12	p12	12
11	a11	b11	c11	d11	e11	f11	g11	h11	i11	j11	k11	l11	m11	n11	o11	p11	11
10	a10	b10	c10	d10	e10	f10	g10	h10	i10	j10	k10	l10	m10	n10	o10	p10	10
9	a9	b9	c9	d9	e9	f9	g9	h9	i9	j9	k9	l9	m9	n9	o9	p9	9
8	a8	b8	c8	d8	e8	f8	g8	h8	i8	j8	k8	l8	m8	n8	o8	p8	8
7	a7	b7	c7	d7	e7	f7	g7	h7	i7	j7	k7	l7	m7	n7	o7	p7	7
6	a6	b6	c6	d6	e6	f6	g6	h6	i6	j6	k6	l6	m6	n6	o6	p6	6
5	a5	b5	c5	d5	e5	f5	g5	h5	i5	j5	k5	l5	m5	n5	o5	p5	5
4	a4 white pawn	b4 white pawn	c4 white pawn	d4 white pawn	e4 white pawn	f4 white pawn	g4 white pawn	h4 white pawn	i4 white pawn	j4 white pawn	k4 white pawn	l4 white pawn	m4 white pawn	n4 white pawn	o4 white pawn	p4 white pawn	4
3	a3 white pawn	b3 white pawn	c3 white pawn	d3 white pawn	e3 white pawn	f3 white pawn	g3 white pawn	h3 white pawn	i3 white pawn	j3 white pawn	k3 white pawn	l3 white pawn	m3 white pawn	n3 white pawn	o3 white pawn	p3 white pawn	3
2	a2 white rook	b2 white knight	c2 white bishop	d2 white queen	e2 white king	f2 white bishop	g2 white knight	h2 white rook	i2 white rook	j2 white knight	k2 white bishop	l2 white queen	m2 white king	n2 white bishop	o2 white knight	p2 white rook	2
1	a1 white rook	b1 white knight	c1 white bishop	d1 white queen	e1 white king	f1 white bishop	g1 white knight	h1 white rook	i1 white rook	j1 white knight	k1 white bishop	l1 white queen	m1 white king	n1 white bishop	o1 white knight	p1 white rook	1
	a	b	c	d	e	f	g	h	i	j	k	l	m	n	o	p

64-piece initial setup, simply repeating the orthodox setup four times. This has the problem that each player has four kings, doubled rooks on the central files, and doubled pawns on each file. Betza did suggest that it could be practical to put the kings on i2 and i15, put weak pieces on the third ranks, pawns on the fourth ranks, and fill the remainder with other pieces. This would have the initial position occupy half the board, just like in orthodox chess, and unlike how it is in four-board chess (one quarter) or nine-board chess (one sixth). Betza did not go further with this possibility, stating: "although I think it is probably playable, the huge mass of pieces seems too heavy for my taste."

=== Three dimensions ===
Betza suggested a 16×16×16 three-dimensional adaptation of the rules of chess on a really big board, which would be formed by pushing eight 8×8×8 boards into a cube and then translating the moves into 3D following how he did so for his version of 8×8×8 3D chess, although he expressed reservations about the likely game length.

=== Unrealised suggestions ===
Betza also suggested "Four Board Great Chess", which would have more pieces than the rose that could not make their full moves on smaller boards, and having pawns on the third rank and about 24 pieces in the two rows behind them; and similarly, "Four Board Great Shatranj", where the pieces would be weakened further. Another suggestion of his was four-board chess with different armies, suggesting that one player could use knights and the other could use fibnifs (fbNF; makes longest forward or backward moves as knight, or moves as ferz), though noting that creating completely new armies was not possible in 1996 as the values of long-range pieces on 16×16 boards were not yet known to much precision. However, none were developed beyond ideas.

A further variant Betza considered is "Sixty-Four Board Chess", which would be played on a 64×64 board with 4,096 squares (the same as 16×16×16 chess). Betza's comment was:

A chessboard of chessboards! You must use very small chessboards and sets, and you must have very long arms. You must also have a long time to play! I can enjoy this game more by just thinking about it than I could by actually trying to play it...

— Ralph Betza

Similarly, he considered a 64×64×64 3D variant, which he put forward as a possible world record for the largest chess variant (having 262,144 cubes), although he did not completely specify the rules, beyond stating that the standard opening setup for orthodox chess would simply be repeated to fill the 64×64 boards.

No special equipment required, except for a high ceiling and a very strong floor in the room where you do this.

I suppose you might need very long arms to move the pieces, and a telescope to see the enemy King, it's so far away.

— Ralph Betza
