= British variant =

British variant may refer to:

- SARS-CoV-2 Alpha variant (Lineage B.1.1.7), a variant of the virus that causes COVID-19
- British English, the standard dialect of the English language as spoken and written in the United Kingdom
- British Chess Variants Society, an association of chess variant players and developers
