= Dice chess =

Chess variant in which dice are used to alter gameplay

Dice chess can refer to a number of chess variants in which dice are used to alter gameplay; specifically that the moves available to each player are determined by rolling one or more ordinary six-sided dice. There are many different variations of this form of dice chess.

== Sample game ==
Position: b8 black rook, c8 black bishop, d8 black queen, e8 black king, f8 black bishop, g8 black knight, h8 black rook, a7 black pawn, b7 black pawn, c7 black pawn, d7 black pawn, e7 black pawn, f7 white bishop, g7 black pawn, h7 black pawn, c6 black knight, g5 white knight, e4 white pawn, a2 white pawn, b2 white pawn, c2 white pawn, d2 white pawn, f2 white pawn, g2 white pawn, h2 white pawn, a1 white rook, b1 white knight, c1 white bishop, d1 white queen, e1 white king, h1 white rook

Black is checkmated.

In a game, players alternate rolling the dice and, if possible, moving. On each die, the one represents a pawn, two a knight, three a bishop, four a rook, five a queen, and six a king. The player may move pieces indicated on die or dice thrown. For example, a player rolling a one and a two may move either a pawn or a knight. A player who rolls doubles (the same number on both dice) may play any legal move. Otherwise, standard chess rules apply.

Here is a sample game of dice chess with two dice:

White rolls doubles, allowing her to play any move, and selects 1.e4. Black rolls a two and a three; no bishop move being possible, he plays 1...Nc6. White rolls a three and a four, and plays 2.Bc4. Black rolls a four and a five; since no queen move is possible, he must play the only legal rook move, 2...Rb8. White rolls a three and a six, and plays 3.Bxf7+. Black rolls a two and a four; since no knight or rook move is a legal response to the check, he must pass. (Only a six, or doubles, would have allowed him to move.) White rolls a two and a four, and chooses 4.Nf3. (A three or five would have enabled an immediate win with 4.Bxe8, 4.Qf3# or 4.Qh5#). Black rolls a one and a three; again, this does not allow a legal response to the check, so he must pass. White rolls a two and a four, and plays 5.Ng5#, ending the game (see diagram).

== Rules variants ==
There is no standard ruleset for dice chess, and so games called dice chess may have different rules.

One variant with a single die has the following rules:

- The players roll only one die.
- Pawns may move from the seventh to the eighth rank not only on a roll of one (when they promote to a piece of the player's choice), but also on a roll of two, three, four or five (when they can promote only to the piece specified by the roll).
- There is no check or checkmate. Rather, the goal is to actually capture the king.

Dice chess can be played on 10x10 board (see diagram). Adding two kings reduces the impact of chance and adds more strategic depth to the game.

	a	b	c	d	e	f	g	h	i	j
10	a10 black rook	b10 black knight	c10 black bishop	d10 black queen	e10 black king	f10 black king	g10 black king	h10 black bishop	i10 black knight	j10 black rook	10
9	a9 black pawn	b9 black pawn	c9 black pawn	d9 black pawn	e9 black pawn	f9 black pawn	g9 black pawn	h9 black pawn	i9 black pawn	j9 black pawn	9
8	a8	b8	c8	d8	e8	f8	g8	h8	i8	j8	8
7	a7	b7	c7	d7	e7	f7	g7	h7	i7	j7	7
6	a6	b6	c6	d6	e6	f6	g6	h6	i6	j6	6
5	a5	b5	c5	d5	e5	f5	g5	h5	i5	j5	5
4	a4	b4	c4	d4	e4	f4	g4	h4	i4	j4	4
3	a3	b3	c3	d3	e3	f3	g3	h3	i3	j3	3
2	a2 white pawn	b2 white pawn	c2 white pawn	d2 white pawn	e2 white pawn	f2 white pawn	g2 white pawn	h2 white pawn	i2 white pawn	j2 white pawn	2
1	a1 white rook	b1 white knight	c1 white bishop	d1 white queen	e1 white king	f1 white king	g1 white king	h1 white bishop	i1 white knight	j1 white rook	1
	a	b	c	d	e	f	g	h	i	j

Dice chess on 10×10 board

Other rule variants include:

- a player who has no legal move with either of the pieces indicated by the dice loses that turn (passed turn);
- if castling is otherwise legal, a player may castle upon rolling a four, six, or doubles;
- an en passant capture of a pawn is possible only if the player rolls a one, or doubles, immediately once the opportunity for the en passant capture arises;
- a player who is in check must roll for a piece that can make a legal response to that check (capturing the checking piece, moving the king, or interposing a piece). If the player does not get a piece that can make a legal move, they lose that turn but do not automatically lose the game.
- except in the unlikely event that the game ends in a draw pursuant to the standard rules of chess, the game ends when one player either checkmates the opponent or captures the opponent's king.
- Sometimes it is played with 3 dice aswell

Another form of dice chess is Vegas Fun Chess, whose rules are described on The Chess Variant Pages. That site also states that "Pritchard's Encyclopedia of Chess Variants contains descriptions of seven versions of what he calls 'Dice Chess'."

John Gollon, in his book Chess Variations: Ancient, Regional, and Modern, notes three ways in which dice may be used in connection with a game of chess. The most common is similar to that described in the preceding sections. A second way to use dice is to have each player roll one die on each turn, with the number rolled indicating the number of moves to be played. The maximum number of moves that can be played is usually four, so a roll of a four, five, or six allows the player to make four moves. A third form of the game uses two dice of contrasting colors, with one determining the piece that can move, and the other the number of moves that the piece makes.

== History ==
Anne Sunnucks writes that there is evidence from the literature of the period that dice were used to play chess in Europe between the 11th and 14th centuries, and even earlier in Burma and India. The dice were thrown before each turn to determine the piece to be moved; the same numbering system as set forth above was used (one=pawn, two=knight, etc.). In the Burmese form of the game, three dice were thrown and each player made three moves at a time. A similar variant emerged in the 2000s in Moscow, thought to have been derived from Chaturanga and using three dice. Vladimir Pribylinec writes that the cubes in Cubic Chess move as in orthochess by a symbol uppermost as is described in both editions of Pritchard's Encyclopedia of Chess Variants, first published in 1977. In the variant "Protheus," cubes are turned on the adjacent squares.

It has now been put onto a website to play online where you play with 3 dice an 8x8 board.

== See also ==
- Chaturaji
