= Three-check chess =

Variant where three checks wins the game

Three-check chess, also simply known as three-check, is a chess variant where a player can win by placing their opponent in check three times. Apart from this, standard rules of chess apply, including starting position and other ending conditions, such as stalemate and checkmate. A move is considered to give one check if the king is threatened, regardless if multiple pieces are checking the king. Three-check can be played over the board, but it is also popular on internet chess servers such as Chess.com and Lichess.

== History ==
It is unknown specifically where three-check chess originated, but David Pritchard, author of The Encyclopedia of Chess Variants, suspected Soviet origin, and noted that Anatoly Karpov was an "invincible" player of three-check chess in his youth. On Lichess, the three-check world championship is hosted yearly. Other strong players who have played three-check include grandmasters Maxime Vachier-Lagrave and Sergei Zhigalko.

== Strategy ==
Given that the game is quickly completed, and often not decided by checkmate, three-check players will frequently sacrifice pieces if they are guaranteed to achieve one or multiple checks on the king. Opening diagonals towards the king is inadvisable – 1. d4? allows the immediate 1... e5! taking advantage of white's dark-squared weaknesses upon the a5-e1 diagonal.

International Master Daniel Rensch has written for Chess.com on strategic and tactical opportunities to be wary of while playing three-check:

- Keep the diagonals to one's own king closed. Rensch recommends the Sicilian Defence, though warns of a deadly trap: 1. e4 c5 2. Bc4 Nc6?? 3. Bxf7+! Kxf7 4. Qh5+ and white delivers the third check on the next move.
- Remove one's own king from an open file - although Rensch does not consider files to be as dangerous as diagonals in three-check, he mentions that "open files are the quickest way for a winning position to become a lost one in three-check!"
- Never allow consecutive checks, even if it means gaining material. The initiative in three-check is extremely powerful, and it is common to sacrifice several pieces to achieve multiple checks.
- A queen is especially powerful, because with few exceptions it is always able to get at least two consecutive checks. The exceptions are: the queen can be captured immediately; the queen is absolutely pinned against its own king and the line of the pin has no square from which the queen can give a followup check; or a cross-check achieved by a discovered check where the moving piece blocks the original check, and the queen cannot block the check or capture the checking piece with check (including when the cross-check is the third check for that player, and when the blocking move also absolutely pins the queen).

== Sources ==
- Pritchard, D. B. (1994). The Encyclopedia of Chess Variants. Games & Puzzles Publications. ISBN 0-9524142-0-1.
- Pritchard, D. B. (2007). Beasley, John (ed.). The Classified Encyclopedia of Chess Variants. John Beasley. ISBN 978-0-9555168-0-1.
