= Unachess =

Chess variant

Unachess is a chess variant played with a standard board and pieces. It starts with each player having all his pieces in hand. The players start by putting their pieces on the board. Captures cannot be made by a side until its king has been placed on the board.
