= Spherical chess =

Chess variants played on spherical boards

Spherical chess is any of several chess variants played on boards composed of fields arranged on the surface of a sphere.

== Miller's spherical chess ==
A variant described by Don Miller in 1965 and later modified by Leo Nadvorney. The fields of the board form eight rings around the sphere each consisting of eight squares and with the fields touching the poles degenerated into spherical triangles.

== Murali's spherical chess ==
This variant is played on a board obtained by drawing two sets of circles with orthogonal axes of rotation on the sphere. Both players pieces are initially arranged on opposite hemispheres. Each player has a standard set of king, queen, bishop, knight and rook arranged in a square pattern surrounding a central empty square. These pieces are surrounded by 16 pawns in another square layer. Pawns move one field orthogonally away from their initial position with the exception of the four pawns at the four corners of the setup, which have two possible directions. They all capture one field diagonally forward. The other pieces have the moves from standard chess adapted to the spherical geometry. For example, the rook can move any number of fields orthogonally up to one of the "poles" of the grid and continue on the other side of the sphere, except that a "null move" is not allowed. This rule regarding "null move" also applies to the bishop and the queen. Pawns promote when reaching the fields where the opponents pieces other than pawns are initially placed.

== Tuveson and Saul's spherical chess ==
A variant developed by Jared Tuveson and Lukas Saul. The board has differently shaped fields, some of them being triangles and others squares. Special rules govern the moves of the pieces on the triangular fields.
