= Francesco Piacenza =

- Born: 1637; Naples, Kingdom of Naples
- Died: 1687 (aged 49–50); Modena, Duchy of Modena and Reggio
- Occupations: Jurist, cartographer, chess master
- Known for: I Campeggiamenti negli Scacchi, L'Egeo Redivivo

Francesco Piacenza (1637 – 1687) was an Italian jurist, cartographer, and chess master.

== Biography ==
Piacenza held a doctorate in civil and canon law. He served for eight years as secretary to the ambassador of His Catholic Majesty in Germany. In Bologna, he worked as secretary to Prince Guzman while Cardinal Giacomo Boncompagni was archbishop of the city.

In 1683, he published the chess treatise I Campeggiamenti negli Scacchi, ossia nuova disciplina d'attacchi, difese e partiti del giuoco nello stile antico, che nel nuovo arciscacchiere, stratagemmi ed invenzioni in Turin. Piacenza traveled extensively throughout Italy and abroad, playing chess for money stakes. He specialized in playing odds games with marked pieces or marked squares. He also invented a 100-square chess variant ("arciscacchiere") introducing two new fairy pieces: the Centurion and the Decurion.

Piacenza was a member of the Accademia degli Immobili at the University of Modena, where he taught a course on natural science in 1686–1687. Following a study tour of the Aegean Islands, he wrote L'Egeo Redivivo, ossia corografia dell'arcipelago e dello stato antico e attuale di quelle isole... (a historical and geographical description of the Aegean Archipelago), which was published posthumously in Modena in 1688.

== Bibliography ==
- Chicco, Adriano; Porreca, Giorgio (1971). Dizionario Enciclopedico degli scacchi. Milan: Mursia.
- Rizzacasa, Alessandro (2009). Livorno nella storia degli scacchi. Municipality of Livorno.
