= Chessplus =

Commercial chess variant

- Chessplus cover art, featuring the knawn, a combination of the knight and pawn, as well as both taglines.
- Publishers: Chessplus Team
- Years active: c. 21st century to present
- Genres: Board game Abstract strategy game Mind sport Chess variant
- Players: 2
- Playing time: 5–55 minutes
- Chance: None
- Skills: Strategy, tactics

Chessplus is a commercial chess variant developed by the Australian family business Chessplus Team.

== Gameplay ==
Chessplus plays mostly like normal chess, albeit with a new system, known as "merging". When a piece, besides the king, moves onto a square with another piece of its own colour, they will be "merged". Pieces may "split", and leave a merge, by making one of their moves. Merged rooks may castle if the rook side hasn't moved, and en passant can only be performed by merged of two pawns.

== Inspiration ==
The game was inspired by an illegal move made by Aimee Simpson, one of the members of the Chessplus Team, when she was playing chess with her father, Christian. Aimee had moved her rook onto the same square as one of her pawns, confusing him. On Aimee's next move, she promoted her fusion of pieces to a queen while exclaiming that she was going to beat him.

== Reception ==
Chessplus received generally positive reviews.

== Release ==
=== Physical releases ===
The game has been physically released with 3 different packages.

1. The "Everyday Edition" which is a bag containing pieces.
2. The "Player's Edition" which comes with a board, as well as pieces.
3. The "Designer Edition" which is a board that wraps around the pieces.

The pieces themselves, besides the king, are designed with the game's "merge" system in mind, being half of what their normal version would be.

=== Steam release ===
On 29 August 2025, the game was announced to be receiving a digital release through Steam sometime in 2026.
