= Dunsany's chess =

Chess variant

Position: a8 black rook, b8 black knight, c8 black bishop, d8 black queen, e8 black king, f8 black bishop, g8 black knight, h8 black rook, a7 black pawn, b7 black pawn, c7 black pawn, d7 black pawn, e7 black pawn, f7 black pawn, g7 black pawn, h7 black pawn, a4 white pawn, b4 white pawn, c4 white pawn, d4 white pawn, e4 white pawn, f4 white pawn, g4 white pawn, h4 white pawn, a3 white pawn, b3 white pawn, c3 white pawn, d3 white pawn, e3 white pawn, f3 white pawn, g3 white pawn, h3 white pawn, a2 white pawn, b2 white pawn, c2 white pawn, d2 white pawn, e2 white pawn, f2 white pawn, g2 white pawn, h2 white pawn, a1 white pawn, b1 white pawn, c1 white pawn, d1 white pawn, e1 white pawn, f1 white pawn, g1 white pawn, h1 white pawn

Dunsany's chess starting setup

Dunsany's chess, also known as Dunsany's game, is an asymmetric chess variant in which Black has the standard chess army and White has 32 pawns. This game was invented by Lord Dunsany in 1942. It was published the same year in Fairy Chess Review (August issue) and in Joseph Boyer's Nouveaux Jeux d'Echecs Non-orthodoxes. A similar game is Horde chess.

== Game rules ==
Black's setup is the same in regular chess; White's army consists of 32 pawns, filling ranks one through four, as shown in the diagram. Rules are the same as in regular chess, with the following exceptions:

- Black moves first.
- Only Black's pawns have the two-step option on their first move.
- Black wins by capturing all 32 white pawns; White wins by checkmating Black.

As in regular chess, pawns promote on the final rank, and stalemate occurs if White's pawns run out of moves.

== Horde chess ==
Position: a8 black pawn, b8 black pawn, c8 black pawn, f8 black pawn, g8 black pawn, h8 black pawn, a7 black pawn, b7 black pawn, c7 black pawn, d7 black pawn, e7 black pawn, f7 black pawn, g7 black pawn, h7 black pawn, a6 black pawn, b6 black pawn, c6 black pawn, d6 black pawn, e6 black pawn, f6 black pawn, g6 black pawn, h6 black pawn, a5 black pawn, b5 black pawn, c5 black pawn, d5 black pawn, e5 black pawn, f5 black pawn, g5 black pawn, h5 black pawn, d4 black pawn, e4 black pawn, a2 white pawn, b2 white pawn, c2 white pawn, d2 white pawn, e2 white pawn, f2 white pawn, g2 white pawn, h2 white pawn, a1 white rook, b1 white knight, c1 white bishop, d1 white queen, e1 white king, f1 white bishop, g1 white knight, h1 white rook

Horde chess starting setup

Horde chess, introduced by Filip Rachunek in 2002, is similar to Dunsany's chess but with the following differences:

- White's pieces are the normal chess pieces, and Black's pieces are 32 pawns, occupying ranks five through eight, but with pawns on d4 and e4 instead of d8 and e8.
- White moves first.
- Black's pawns on rank seven have the two-step option of regular chess.

Horde chess is one of the few chess variants to have a full theory book written about it.

=== Horde variant ===
Position: a8 black rook, b8 black knight, c8 black bishop, d8 black queen, e8 black king, f8 black bishop, g8 black knight, h8 black rook, a7 black pawn, b7 black pawn, c7 black pawn, d7 black pawn, e7 black pawn, f7 black pawn, g7 black pawn, h7 black pawn, b5 white pawn, c5 white pawn, f5 white pawn, g5 white pawn, a4 white pawn, b4 white pawn, c4 white pawn, d4 white pawn, e4 white pawn, f4 white pawn, g4 white pawn, h4 white pawn, a3 white pawn, b3 white pawn, c3 white pawn, d3 white pawn, e3 white pawn, f3 white pawn, g3 white pawn, h3 white pawn, a2 white pawn, b2 white pawn, c2 white pawn, d2 white pawn, e2 white pawn, f2 white pawn, g2 white pawn, h2 white pawn, a1 white pawn, b1 white pawn, c1 white pawn, d1 white pawn, e1 white pawn, f1 white pawn, g1 white pawn, h1 white pawn

Horde variant starting setup

A Horde variant uses the opening setup shown in the diagram. In this variant, White has 36 pawns instead of 32. White's pawns on the first and second ranks may advance one or two steps, provided that the path on the file is free. Unlike in regular chess, this does not have to be the pawn's first move.
