= Omega Chess =

Commercial chess variant

| w4 wd | ^{<W4}_{A} | _{B} | _{C} | _{D} | _{E} | _{F} | _{G} | _{H} | _{I} | ^{W3>}_{J} | w3 wd |
| 9 | a9 zd | b9 rd | c9 nd | d9 bd | e9 qd | f9 kd | g9 bd | h9 nd | i9 rd | j9 zd | 9 |
| 8 | a8 pd | b8 pd | c8 pd | d8 pd | e8 pd | f8 pd | g8 pd | h8 pd | i8 pd | j8 pd | 8 |
| 7 | a7 | b7 | c7 | d7 | e7 | f7 | g7 | h7 | i7 | j7 | 7 |
| 6 | a6 | b6 | c6 | d6 | e6 | f6 | g6 | h6 | i6 | j6 | 6 |
| 5 | a5 | b5 | c5 | d5 | e5 | f5 | g5 | h5 | i5 | j5 | 5 |
| 4 | a4 | b4 | c4 | d4 | e4 | f4 | g4 | h4 | i4 | j4 | 4 |
| 3 | a3 | b3 | c3 | d3 | e3 | f3 | g3 | h3 | i3 | j3 | 3 |
| 2 | a2 | b2 | c2 | d2 | e2 | f2 | g2 | h2 | i2 | j2 | 2 |
| 1 | a1 pl | b1 pl | c1 pl | d1 pl | e1 pl | f1 pl | g1 pl | h1 pl | i1 pl | j1 pl | 1 |
| 0 | a0 zl | b0 rl | c0 nl | d0 bl | e0 ql | f0 kl | g0 bl | h0 nl | i0 rl | j0 zl | 0 |
| w1 wl | ^{A}_{<W1} | ^{B} | ^{C} | ^{D} | ^{E} | ^{F} | ^{G} | ^{H} | ^{I} | ^{J}_{W2>} | w2 wl |

Omega Chess starting position

Omega Chess is a commercial chess variant designed and released in 1992 by Daniel MacDonald. The game is played on a 10×10 board with four extra squares, each added diagonally adjacent to the corner squares. The game is laid out like standard chess with the addition of a champion in each corner of the 10×10 board and a wizard in each new added corner square.

Part of the reason for adding the new pieces was to equalize the number of jumping pieces with sliding pieces. The wizard was created specially to be a color-bound piece, an analog to the bishop. Because of the symmetry and four additional corners, Omega Chess creates new tactical possibilities, including the possibility of forcing checkmate with two knights.

Omega Chess has garnered endorsements by grandmasters Michael Rohde and Alex Sherzer.

== Differences from standard chess ==
=== New pieces ===
| w4 | ^{<W4}_{A} | _{B} | _{C} | _{D} | _{E} | _{F} | _{G} | _{H} | _{I} | ^{W3>}_{J} | w3 |
| 9 | a9 xx | b9 | c9 xx | d9 | e9 xx | f9 | g9 | h9 | i9 | j9 | 9 |
| 8 | a8 | b8 | c8 xx | d8 | e8 | f8 xo | g8 | h8 xo | i8 | j8 | 8 |
| 7 | a7 xx | b7 xx | c7 zd | d7 xx | e7 xx | f7 | g7 | h7 | i7 | j7 | 7 |
| 6 | a6 | b6 | c6 xx | d6 nl | e6 | f6 xo | g6 | h6 xo | i6 | j6 xo | 6 |
| 5 | a5 xx | b5 | c5 xx | d5 | e5 xx | f5 | g5 wd | h5 | i5 | j5 | 5 |
| 4 | a4 | b4 | c4 | d4 xo | e4 | f4 xo | g4 | h4 xo | i4 | j4 xo | 4 |
| 3 | a3 | b3 | c3 | d3 | e3 | f3 | g3 | h3 | i3 | j3 | 3 |
| 2 | a2 | b2 | c2 | d2 | e2 | f2 xo | g2 | h2 xo | i2 | j2 | 2 |
| 1 | a1 | b1 | c1 | d1 | e1 | f1 | g1 | h1 | i1 | j1 | 1 |
| 0 | a0 | b0 | c0 | d0 | e0 | f0 | g0 | h0 | i0 | j0 | 0 |
| w1 | ^{A}_{<W1} | ^{B} | ^{C} | ^{D} | ^{E} | ^{F} | ^{G} | ^{H} | ^{I} | ^{J}_{W2>} | w2 |

The champion can leap to any of the black crosses. The wizard can leap to any of the black dots or capture the knight.
- Champions: are, like knights, classed as leapers. A champion can jump two squares orthogonally or diagonally or slide one square orthogonally. White's kingside champion can start the game by Ch2 or Cj2. In the position shown at the right, the black champion's movement is indicated by an X, and it cannot capture the white knight. The champion is represented as WAD in Betza notation, combining the moves of the wazir, alfil, and dabbaba.
- Wizards: are also classed as leapers, but, like a bishop, is a color-bound piece that can jump (1,3) or (3,1) squares in any direction or slide one square diagonally. White's king wizard can start the game by Wj2. In the position shown at the right, the black wizard's movement is indicated by a black dot, and it can capture the white knight. The wizard is represented as FC or FL in Betza notation, combining the moves of the ferz and camel.

=== Pawns ===
| w4 | ^{<W4}_{A} | _{B} | _{C} | _{D} | _{E} | _{F} | _{G} | _{H} | _{I} | ^{W3>}_{J} | w3 |
| 9 | a9 | b9 | c9 | d9 | e9 | f9 | g9 | h9 | i9 | j9 | 9 |
| 8 | a8 | b8 | c8 | d8 | e8 | f8 | g8 | h8 | i8 | j8 | 8 |
| 7 | a7 | b7 | c7 | d7 | e7 | f7 | g7 | h7 | i7 | j7 | 7 |
| 6 | a6 | b6 | c6 | d6 | e6 | f6 | g6 | h6 | i6 | j6 | 6 |
| 5 | a5 | b5 | c5 | d5 | e5 | f5 | g5 | h5 | i5 | j5 | 5 |
| 4 | a4 | b4 | c4 pd | d4 pl | e4 | f4 | g4 | h4 | i4 | j4 | 4 |
| 3 | a3 | b3 pl | c3 pd | d3 oo | e3 | f3 | g3 | h3 | i3 | j3 | 3 |
| 2 | a2 pl | b2 oo | c2 | d2 oo | e2 | f2 | g2 | h2 | i2 | j2 | 2 |
| 1 | a1 oo | b1 oo | c1 | d1 oo | e1 | f1 | g1 | h1 | i1 | j1 | 1 |
| 0 | a0 | b0 | c0 | d0 kl | e0 rl | f0 | g0 rl | h0 kl | i0 | j0 | 0 |
| w1 | ^{A}_{<W1} | ^{B} | ^{C} | ^{D} | ^{E} | ^{F} | ^{G} | ^{H} | ^{I} | ^{J}_{W2>} | w2 |

Pawn's first move, en passant capture and castling
- The pawn can advance one, two or three squares forward, on its first move only. This is shown on the a-, b- and d-files, respectively.
- Capture, promotion and movement (following the first move) are otherwise identical to the pawn in standard chess.
- The en passant capture is also possible. A pawn that moves three squares may be captured en passant on either passed square. Thus, if d-pawn has just moved from its starting square, it might be captured en passant by either black pawn. Alternatively, if the b-pawn has just moved from its starting square, it may be captured either normally by the pawn on c4 or en passant by the pawn on c3.

=== Castling ===
The normal rules of castling apply, and it is done exactly as in chess, with the king moving two squares to either side: to h0 for White or h9 for Black when castling kingside; to d0 or d9 when castling queenside (see diagram).

== Example games ==
As seen in the diagrams, the ranks are numbered 0–9, and the corner squares behind a0, j0, j9 and a9 are notated w1, w2, w3 and w4 respectively. These squares are part of the board, and all pieces (except rooks and pawns) can enter them. (See the puzzle by Benjamin Good.)

=== GM Alex Sherzer vs. GM Judit Polgár ===
| w4 | ^{<W4}_{A} | _{B} | _{C} | _{D} | _{E} | _{F} | _{G} | _{H} | _{I} | ^{W3>}_{J} | w3 |
| 9 | a9 | b9 rd | c9 | d9 | e9 | f9 | g9 | h9 | i9 | j9 | 9 |
| 8 | a8 pd | b8 | c8 | d8 | e8 rl | f8 | g8 pd | h8 rd | i8 kd | j8 | 8 |
| 7 | a7 | b7 bd | c7 pd | d7 | e7 | f7 pd | g7 qd | h7 | i7 zd | j7 pd | 7 |
| 6 | a6 | b6 | c6 | d6 | e6 | f6 | g6 pd | h6 | i6 pd | j6 | 6 |
| 5 | a5 | b5 pd | c5 pl | d5 | e5 | f5 pd | g5 | h5 | i5 pl | j5 | 5 |
| 4 | a4 | b4 | c4 | d4 pl | e4 | f4 pl | g4 | h4 | i4 | j4 pl | 4 |
| 3 | a3 | b3 | c3 pl | d3 | e3 rl | f3 | g3 | h3 | i3 ql | j3 | 3 |
| 2 | a2 | b2 | c2 | d2 | e2 | f2 | g2 | h2 zl | i2 | j2 | 2 |
| 1 | a1 pl | b1 bl | c1 | d1 | e1 | f1 | g1 pl | h1 pl | i1 | j1 | 1 |
| 0 | a0 | b0 | c0 | d0 | e0 | f0 | g0 kl | h0 | i0 | j0 | 0 |
| w1 | ^{A}_{<W1} | ^{B} | ^{C} | ^{D} | ^{E} | ^{F} | ^{G} | ^{H} | ^{I} | ^{J}_{W2>} | w2 |

Position after 42.j4

1. f4 d5 2. Nd2 Ng7 3. Wa2 Cc7 4. Ng2 f7 5. Wj2 Wa7 6. e4 de4 7. Ne4 Bb4+ 8. Be1 Nd7 9. c3 Be7 10. Wi5 0-0 11. d4 Cc6 12. Bd3 b5 13. b4 Wd6 14. Cc2 Wj7 15. Ch2 Wi4 16. Nh4 Wh5 17. Wd1 We3+ 18. Kg0 c7 19. i4 Wg4 20. Be2 Wd5 21. Rc0 Bb7 22. Nc5 Nxc5 23. bxc5 Qd8 24. Qh3 Wxh4 25. Bxh4 Bxh4 26. Wxh4 Ch7 27. Wg2 Ce4 28. Cxe4 Wxe4 29. Qj3 j7 30. i5 i6 31. Wg7 hxg7 32. Ri3 Ki8 33. Qj4 Rh9 34. Rj3 Ci7 35. Re0 Qf6 36. Bc0 e6 37. Bb1 Wf5 38. Wf5 ef5 39. Re8 Rh8 40. Rje3 g6 41. Qi3 Qg7 42. j4 (diagram) b4! (Black seizes the initiative) 43. R8e5 bxc3 44. Rxc3 Bxh1+ 45. Kxh1 Rxb1 46. Ra3 Ch7 47. Rxa8 Ch5 48. Ra9 Qh7 49. Ree9?? Cj3! 50. Qxj3 Qxh2+ 0–1

=== Scholar's mate ===
1. f4 f5 2. Bc4 Bc5 3. Qj5 Ng7?? (defending the pawn on f5) 4. Qxg8#

=== Fool's mate ===
1. Wa2 Ng7 2. Wb5 Ni6?? 3. We6#

== Endgames ==
The four corner squares in Omega Chess offer many endgame possibilities and peculiarities. For example, unlike in standard chess, a lone queen (without the king's assistance) can force mate. Two rooks find it easy to mate provided the enemy king is not in a wizard or champion starting square. However, a king and rook cannot force mate, as the rook alone cannot force the king to the edge without driving it into a corner where it is unassailable. Other material combinations leading to relatively straightforward forced wins include two bishops, two knights (also unlike standard chess; see two knights endgame), two champions, and champion and knight. The endgame with bishop and wizard (provided that they are on opposite colors) can also be won, though the technique is somewhat more complex. Other material combinations require that the king be kept out of the wrong-colored corner and thus a more precise technique; these include bishop and champion, wizard and champion, and bishop and knight.

== Omega Chess Advanced ==
| w4 | ^{<W4}_{A} | _{B} | _{C} | _{D} | _{E} | _{F} | _{G} | _{H} | _{I} | ^{W3>}_{J} | w3 |
| 9 | a9 | b9 | c9 | d9 | e9 | f9 | g9 | h9 | i9 | j9 | 9 |
| 8 | a8 | b8 | c8 | d8 | e8 oo | f8 | g8 kd | h8 | i8 oo | j8 | 8 |
| 7 | a7 | b7 | c7 tl | d7 oo | e7 | f7 xx | g7 | h7 xx | i7 | j7 oo | 7 |
| 6 | a6 | b6 xo | c6 qd | d6 xo | e6 xx | f6 | g6 | h6 | i6 xx | j6 | 6 |
| 5 | a5 | b5 | c5 xo | d5 | e5 | f5 | g5 nl | h5 | i5 | j5 | 5 |
| 4 | a4 | b4 | c4 | d4 | e4 xx | f4 | g4 | h4 | i4 xx | j4 | 4 |
| 3 | a3 | b3 | c3 | d3 oo | e3 | f3 xx | g3 | h3 xx | i3 | j3 oo | 3 |
| 2 | a2 | b2 | c2 | d2 | e2 oo | f2 | g2 | h2 | i2 oo | j2 | 2 |
| 1 | a1 | b1 | c1 td | d1 rl | e1 | f1 | g1 | h1 | i1 | j1 | 1 |
| 0 | a0 | b0 | c0 | d0 | e0 | f0 | g0 | h0 | i0 | j0 kl | 0 |
| w1 | ^{A}_{<W1} | ^{B} | ^{C} | ^{D} | ^{E} | ^{F} | ^{G} | ^{H} | ^{I} | ^{J}_{W2>} | w2 |

Omega Chess Advanced: The white fool immobilizes black queen, The black fool – white rook. Black dots show squares where the black fool may move to for freeing own queen from immobilizing. Crosses show knight moves; white dots show extra moves of white Templar Knight if unoccupied.

| w4 | ^{<W4}_{A} | _{B} | _{C} | _{D} | _{E} | _{F} | _{G} | _{H} | _{I} | ^{W3>}_{J} | w3 |
| 9 | a9 | b9 rd | c9 | d9 | e9 | f9 | g9 rd | h9 qd | i9 | j9 | 9 |
| 8 | a8 | b8 | c8 | d8 | e8 | f8 | g8 | h8 | i8 | j8 | 8 |
| 7 | a7 | b7 | c7 | d7 | e7 | f7 | g7 | h7 | i7 | j7 | 7 |
| 6 | a6 | b6 | c6 | d6 | e6 | f6 | g6 | h6 | i6 | j6 | 6 |
| 5 | a5 | b5 | c5 | d5 | e5 | f5 | g5 | h5 | i5 | j5 | 5 |
| 4 | a4 | b4 | c4 | d4 | e4 | f4 | g4 | h4 | i4 | j4 | 4 |
| 3 | a3 | b3 | c3 | d3 | e3 | f3 | g3 | h3 | i3 | j3 | 3 |
| 2 | a2 | b2 | c2 | d2 | e2 | f2 | g2 | h2 | i2 | j2 | 2 |
| 1 | a1 | b1 | c1 | d1 | e1 | f1 | g1 | h1 | i1 | j1 | 1 |
| 0 | a0 | b0 | c0 ql | d0 rl | e0 | f0 | g0 | h0 rl | i0 | j0 | 0 |
| w1 | ^{A}_{<W1} | ^{B} | ^{C} | ^{D} | ^{E} | ^{F} | ^{G} | ^{H} | ^{I} | ^{J}_{W2>} | w2 |

White has guarded queenside and Black has guarded kingside.

In 2008, the authors of Omega Chess developed an extension to the game called Omega Chess Advanced.

- A special move was introduced called Guarding. This move is equal to castling but it is executed by queen and rook. For Guarding to be legal, both the queen and rook must never have made any previous moves, and there may not be any pieces between them. Attacks are irrelevant. Notation is "S-S" or "S-S-S" for queenside or kingside.
- A new piece is introduced called the fool. Each player starts with exactly one.
  - The fool has no starting position on the board. Instead, it can be "introduced" in the first 20 moves of the game, when its player's piece makes its first move, or makes a capture, by placing the fool at that piece's vacated location. When castling or guarding, the fool can be placed on either of the two available squares.
    - Notation is "F". "*F" after a move indicates its "appearance", except when castling or guarding, where "F" replaces the relevant end-symbol (looking from White's side).
  - The fool threatens, moves and captures like the piece that the opponent last used. For example, if White moves a queen, then Black's fool is effectively a queen.
    - If the fool emulates a pawn, then only a single 1st move is allowed, and no promotion.
    - If a king, it cannot be checked, and cannot castle.
    - If a queen, it cannot be guarded.
    - If a fool, it copies the opponent's fool.
    - A pawn can be promoted to a fool.
    - A fool immediately copies a pawn's promotion (unless that is a fool, then it acts as a pawn).
    - A fool can jump from a wizard square to another empty wizard square.
  - "Check threat": after making one's move, an opponent's fool becomes the same piece for one move; if the fool would thus give immediate check, the move would have been illegal, thereby preventing the piece moving ("neutralizing" it) unless it moves to block the check or take the fool.
  - Reciprocal threat: Any piece moving to a position that attacks the opponent's fool is thus immediately threatened by the fool, and so could be taken; a "discovered" attack on the fool may prevent this ("indirect capture"), by moving a different type of piece out of the way instead.
  - If there are extra opponent's fools from promotions, much care is needed.
- The following two rules are optional parts of Omega Chess Advanced:
  - The fool may immobilize an opponent's piece on an orthogonally adjacent square, thus preventing it from moving. In the figure to the right, the white fool has immobilized the black queen, and the black fool has immobilized the white rook. An immobilized piece can move again if the fool moves away or is captured. In addition, an immobilized piece can move if it is also orthogonally adjacent to a friendly fool.
  - A new piece can replace the ordinary knight, called the templar knight. The templar knight moves like an ordinary knight, but it may choose to make a non-capturing (2,3)-leap rather than the usual (1,2)-leap. In the adjacent diagram, the white templar knight may move or capture to any of the squares marked with an X, or move to any of the squares marked with a white dot if they are unoccupied. The Templar Knight is represented as NmZ or NmJ in Betza Notation.

== Puzzle by Benjamin Good ==
| w4 | ^{<W4}_{A} | _{B} | _{C} | _{D} | _{E} | _{F} | _{G} | _{H} | _{I} | ^{W3>}_{J} | w3 |
| 9 | a9 | b9 | c9 | d9 | e9 | f9 bl | g9 | h9 wl | i9 | j9 kd | 9 |
| 8 | a8 | b8 | c8 | d8 | e8 | f8 | g8 | h8 | i8 | j8 pd | 8 |
| 7 | a7 | b7 | c7 | d7 | e7 | f7 | g7 kl | h7 pd | i7 | j7 | 7 |
| 6 | a6 | b6 | c6 | d6 | e6 | f6 | g6 | h6 pl | i6 | j6 | 6 |
| 5 | a5 | b5 | c5 | d5 | e5 | f5 | g5 | h5 | i5 nl | j5 | 5 |
| 4 | a4 | b4 | c4 | d4 | e4 | f4 | g4 | h4 | i4 | j4 | 4 |
| 3 | a3 | b3 | c3 | d3 | e3 | f3 | g3 | h3 | i3 | j3 | 3 |
| 2 | a2 | b2 | c2 | d2 | e2 | f2 | g2 | h2 | i2 | j2 | 2 |
| 1 | a1 | b1 | c1 | d1 | e1 | f1 | g1 | h1 | i1 | j1 | 1 |
| 0 | a0 | b0 | c0 | d0 | e0 | f0 | g0 | h0 | i0 | j0 | 0 |
| w1 | ^{A}_{<W1} | ^{B} | ^{C} | ^{D} | ^{E} | ^{F} | ^{G} | ^{H} | ^{I} | ^{J}_{W2>} | w2 |

White mates in three

Solution: 1.Ww3+:

- 1...Kxw3 2.Bxh7#
- 1...Ki9 2.Nj7+ Ki8 3.Bxh7#
- 1...Ki8 2.Bxh7+ Ki9 3.Nj7#
An alternative line which looks promising is 1.Kh8; if j8 couldn't advance, this would remove Black's options. Since the j8 pawn has not moved, 1...j6 gives Black enough maneuvering room to avoid quick mate and make back some material in the bargain. 1...j5, while permitted, is worse.

== See also ==
- Wildebeest chess, another chess adding two new pieces to equalize the number of jumping pieces (leapers) with sliding pieces (riders)
- Grand Chess
