= Chess variant =

Game related to chess

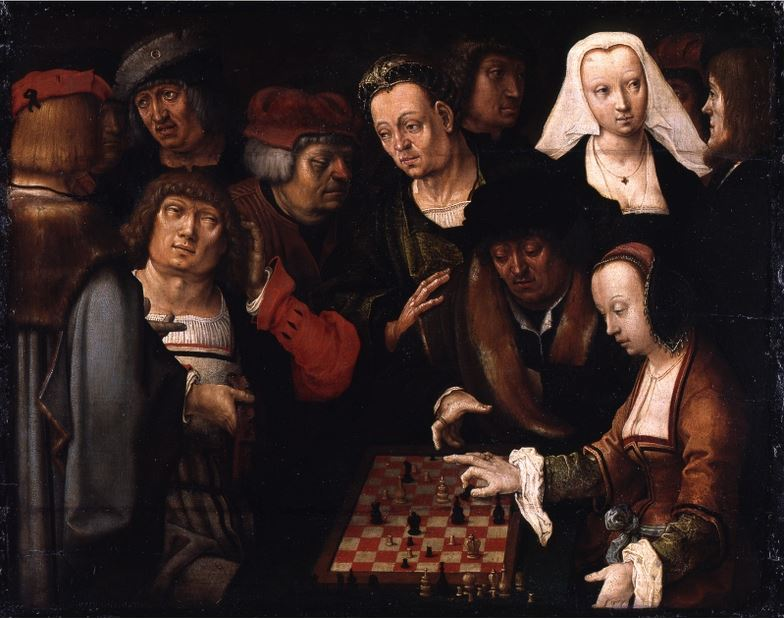
The Chess Players by Lucas van Leyden (c. 1520) depicts a game of Courier chess, a popular medieval chess variant played on a 8x12 board that was played for over 600 years.

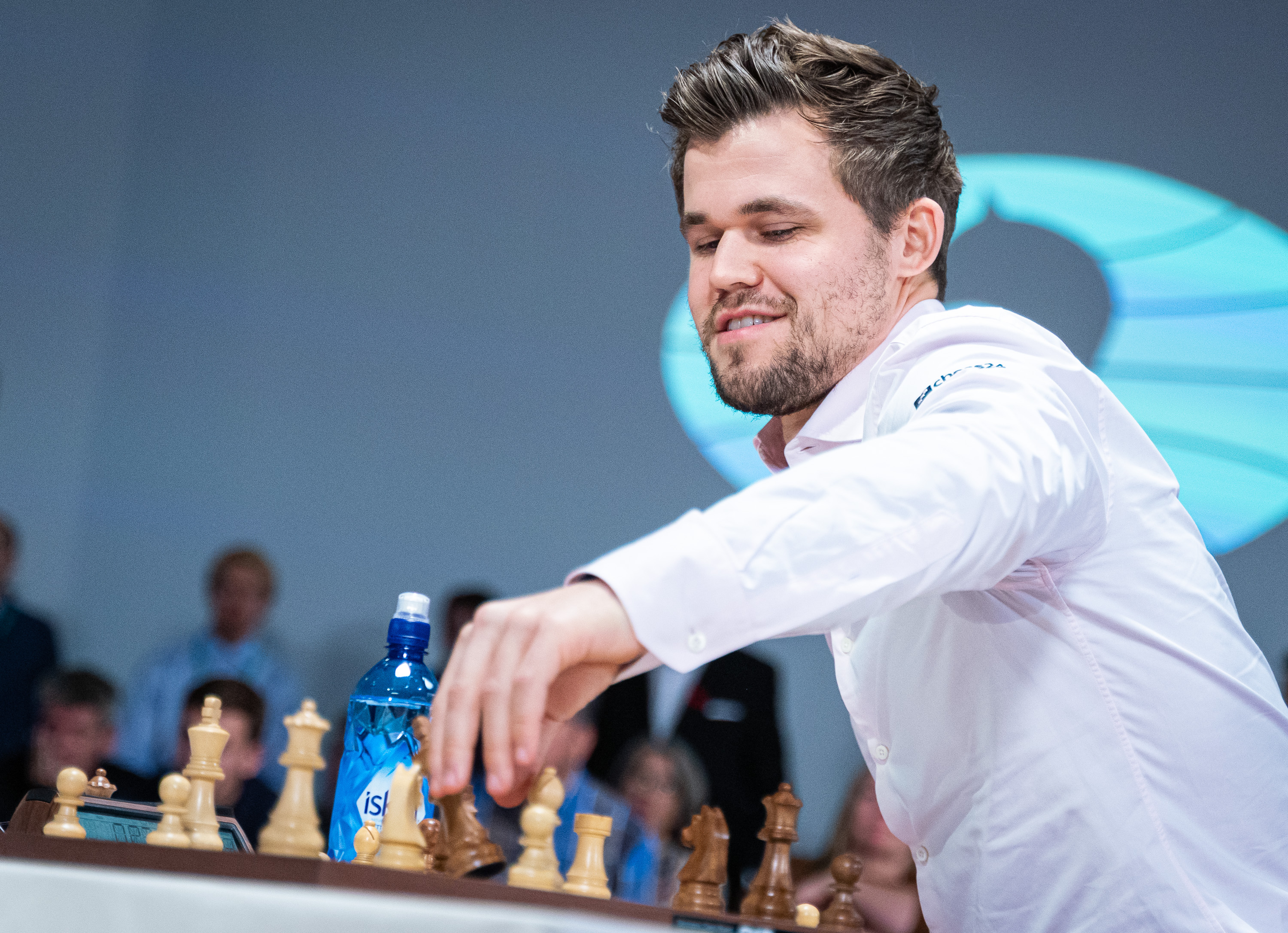
Magnus Carlsen playing in the 2019 FIDE World Fischer Random Chess Championship. FR, also known as Chess960, is one of the most popular modern Chess variants.

A chess variant is any board game related to, derived from, or inspired by orthodox chess. Chess variants can differ from standard chess in many different ways, including variant board sizes, non-standard fairy pieces, alternative starting positions, and additional rules. There are thousands of known chess variants (see list of chess variants). The Classified Encyclopedia of Chess Variants catalogues around two thousand, with the preface noting that—since creating a chess variant is relatively easy—many were considered insufficiently notable for inclusion. While most chess variants are not widely played, some have reached modest levels of popularity, with the most successful being Chess960. Several well known modern chess masters like Capablanca, Fischer, and Yasser Seirewan developed their own chess variants.

"Classical", "orthodox" or "Western" chess itself is one of a family of games which have related origins and could be considered part of the same board game family. Modern chess itself developed from the Indian chaturanga via the Middle-eastern shatranj. During the Middle Ages, there were numerous popular chess variants, like Great chess and Courier chess. Modern chess variants are mostly all variations on standard Western chess. Though not technically variants of modern chess, there are also many regional games which are part of the same family, such as shogi (Japan), sittuyin (Burma), makruk (Thailand), hiashatar (Mongolia), and xiangqi (China). These games have their own history of variants (see shogi variants and xiangqi variants).

Many modern chess variants are designed to be played with the standard chess board and chessmen (such as chess960 and crazyhouse), but others require special equipment such as unique boards and chessmen to represent the fairy pieces. Most variants have a similar public-domain status as their parent game, but some have been made into commercial proprietary games. Just as in traditional chess, chess variants can be played over the board, by correspondence, or by computer. Some internet chess servers facilitate the play of some variants in addition to orthodox chess.

In the context of chess problems, chess variants are also called heterodox chess or fairy chess. Fairy chess variants tend to be created for problem composition rather than actual play.

== Overview ==
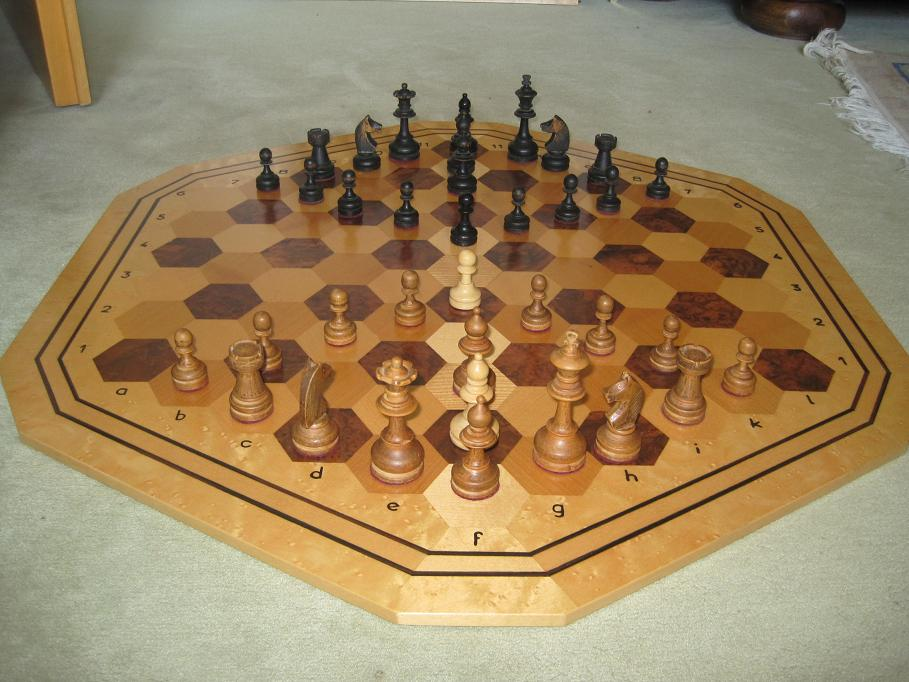
Hexagonal chess uses a chess board composed of hexagons instead of squares.

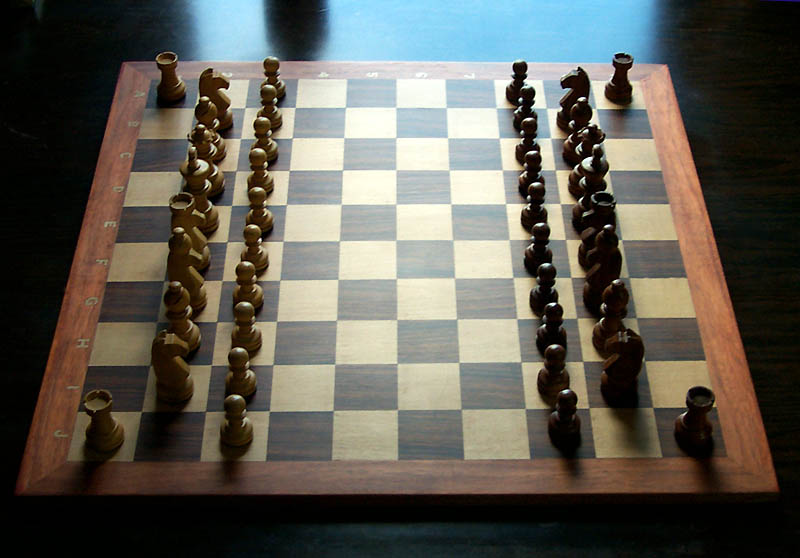
The starting position of Grand Chess, a variant of Capablanca chess developed by Christian Freeling

A Chess variant or a heterodox chess game is any game which closely resembles classic chess with one or more differences. These differences can include alternative pieces, boards, rules or even number of players. The term "variety of Chess" was in use by the late 19th century. British chess historian H. J. R. Murray discusses different variants in his A History of Chess (1913), indicating that he considers the term "chess" to refer to a family of games that includes not just modern classical chess but "all the games which I traced back to the Indian chaturanga, and all the freak modifications that have been attempted from time to time."

There are thousands of chess variants. According to Cazaux & Knowlton in their A World of Chess that "the world of chess variants is endless. Pritchard offers more than 1600 samples in his Encyclopedia of Chess Variants, and the Chess Variants Pages on the Internet have several thousand entries."

While some regional variants have historical origins comparable to or even older than modern orthodox chess, the majority of chess variants are modern attempts by individuals or small groups to create new variations on orthodox chess. Variants can themselves be developed into further sub-variants, for example Capablanca chess led to numerous adaptions and Horde chess is a variation upon Dunsany's Chess.

Some chess variants were created to address a perceived issue with the traditional game of chess. For example, chess960 (also known as Fischer random chess), which randomizes the starting positions of the pieces on the first and eighth ranks, was introduced by grandmaster Bobby Fischer to combat what he perceived to be the detrimental dominance of opening preparation in chess.

A similar motivation was behind the development of Capablanca chess by Cuban chess world champion José Raúl Capablanca. This variant uses two new pieces: marshal and cardinal. These pieces were also used by Pietro Carrera in his earlier 17th century Chess variant (Carrera's chess).

Some modern chess variants are designed and sold as commercial board games. Examples include Icehouse: The Martian Chess Set (which can be used to play Martian Chess), Omega Chess and Chessplus.

In the field of chess composition, some chess variations may be created for the purpose of composing interesting puzzles, rather than being intended for full games. This field of chess composition is known as fairy chess. These fairy chess problems may not be necessarily invented to play real games.

Fairy chess gave rise to the term "fairy chess piece" which is used more broadly across writings about chess variants to describe chess pieces with movement rules other than those of the standard chess pieces. Forms of standardised notation have been devised to systematically describe the movement of these. A distinguishing feature of several chess variants is the presence of one or more fairy pieces. Physical models of common fairy pieces are sold by major chess set suppliers.

The term fairy chess was introduced by Henry Tate in 1914. Thomas R. Dawson (1889–1951), the "father of fairy chess", invented many fairy pieces and new conditions. He was also problem editor of Fairy Chess Review (1930–1951). Another publication on the topic from the 20th century was Anthony Dickins' A Guide to Fairy Chess (1973).

== History ==
The origins of the chess family of board games can be traced to the game of chaturanga during the time of the Gupta Empire in India. Over time, as the game spread geographically, modified versions of the rules became popular in different regions. In Sassanid Persia, a slightly modified form became known as shatranj, and it is this game which was first introduced into Europe through contacts with the Arab world, especially in Spain.

The Indian chaturanga continued to be played in India with various rule changes and starting arrays being introduced throughout its history. Several variants evolved from it, such as the four-player chaturaji and the asymmetrical sarvatobhadra (commonly known as "maharajah and the sepoys").

Various Indian large board variants with unique chess pieces were also introduced in later times such as the variant discussed in the Harihara chaturaga of Prataparudra of Odisha (r. 1497–1540) played on a 14x14 board, Hyderbarad decimal chess (10x10 board) and Hyderbarad shatranj kabir (12x12).

=== Islamic variants ===
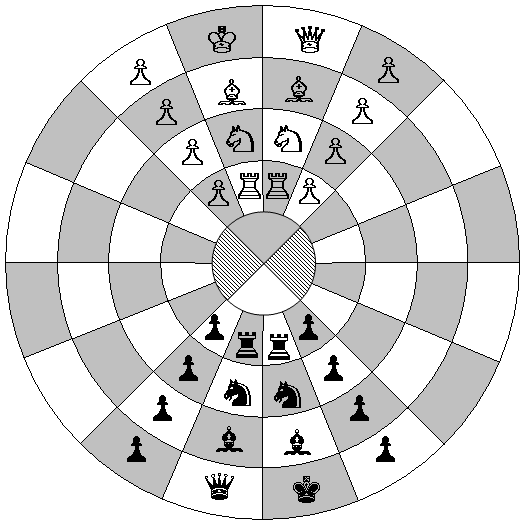
Byzantine chess (ar Rumiya, "Roman") variant with citadels in the center

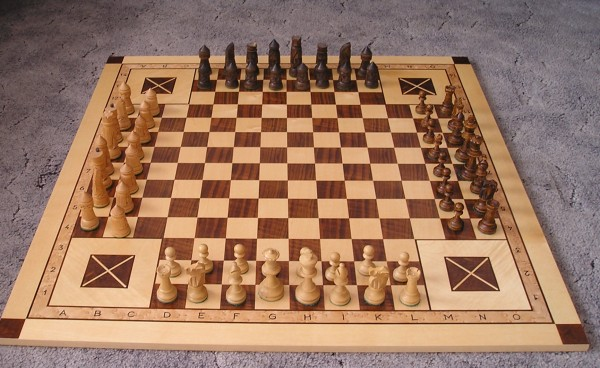
A modern four player chess variant. Many variations of four player chess have been made, the earliest of which was chaturaji, described by al-Biruni in his Book of India (c. 1030).

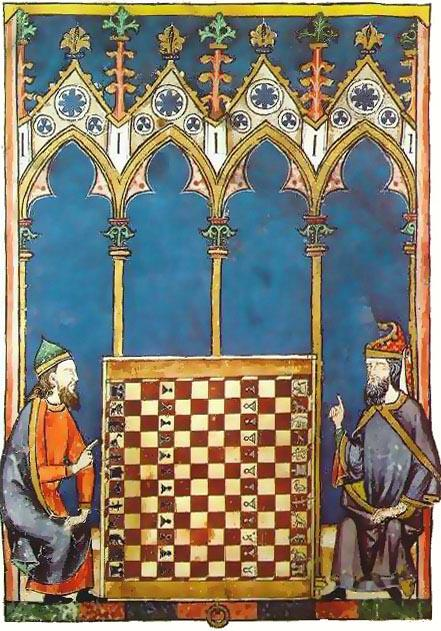
An illustration from the Libro de los Juegos depicting grant acedrex played on a 12x12 board

There were several historical variants of shatranj, such as "complete shatranj" (shatranj al-tamma) which used a board of 10x10 squares and introduced the dabbaba (siege engine) piece. Chess variants of the Muslim world continued to develop alongside classic shatranj for centuries, and most Islamic chess treatises contained explanations of different chess variants. In his famous epic, the Shahnameh, Ferdowsi includes a discussion of an alternative version of 10x10 shatranj which uses a different piece, the camel (shutur). Several other 10x10 chess variants were developed in the Muslim world, including citadel chess (shatranj al-husun). This variant includes four extra squares on each corner of the board which gives the king an extra place to retreat to.

Yet another ancient version of shatranj played in the Islamic world was Byzantine chess (Arabic: shatranj ar-rumiya), an early form of circular chess. One variant of this circular chess also had four citadels in the center.

An even larger shatranj variant played with numerous extra pieces was Tamerlane chess (shatranj al-kabir, "Great Chess"). Developed during the reign of Emperor Timur (1320s–1405), this game was the emperor's favorite and had several unique pieces. The game is discussed in numerous surviving manuscripts and there are several versions of it with differing piece types. "Great chess" variants continued to be developed after Timur's time. Turkish great chess was one popular descendant of the Timur chess. This variant used an even bigger 13x13 board and introduced even a new unique piece called the rhino which moved like a knight and a bishop.

=== Pre-modern Europe ===
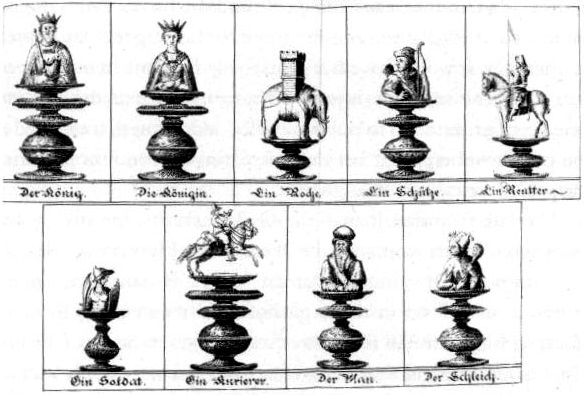
Illustration of courier chess pieces by Gustav Selenus (1616)

Further modifications made to shatranj resulted in the modern game when the modern queen was first introduced in Spain during the 15th century, as seen in the Catalan poem Scachs d'amor. Before the introduction of the queen, European chess instead had a piece called the ferz or vizier (from the Arabic firz or wazīr) which could only move one square diagonally. This piece first experienced a name change to queen or lady (Spanish: dama) before later acquiring its modern movement power in the 15th century. The early European chess bishop was also initially only able to jump to a second square diagonally before acquiring its modern diagonal rider movement.

When it was first introduced, orthodox chess was just another competing chess variant, known as "queen's chess" or "mad queen's chess", but it quickly grew in popularity, becoming the dominant form of the game in Europe.

Other European variations of chess existed however and were popular for hundreds of years before the rise of orthodox chess. During the 12th century, the variant known as "short assize" (French: court assize, "short sitting") was popular in England and France. In the variant the armies started closer together, which was supposed to improve the slowness of the opening phase. Indeed, several regions of Europe had their own "assizes" or unique local rule sets.

Another historical European chess variant is the large board grant acedrex, which is discussed in the Spanish Libro de los Juegos (c. 1283). This variant was played on a 12×12 board and had multiple unique pieces such as the "unicorn", "lion" and "giraffe." The Libro de los Juegos also discusses a four-player chess variant known as four seasons chess.

Courier chess (German: kurierschach) was another popular variant in medieval Europe which had a significant impact on the development of orthodox Western chess and remained popular for over six centuries. It was initially developed in 13th century Germany and was played on a 12x8 board with several extra pieces like two couriers (German: läufer, which moved like a modern bishop), two archers, a mann and fool. Courier chess remained popular among some modern chess aficionados who have developed modern updated variants of it.

=== Modern era ===
The modern era saw an explosion of chess variants, along with the growth of chess literature which catalogued and analyzed these new creations. Several modern chess masters developed new variants, such as Chess960 (introduced as "Fischer Random Chess") by Bobby Fischer, Capablanca Chess by José Raúl Capablanca, and Seirawan chess by Yasser Seirawan. Furthermore, in the 20th and 21st century, computer chess analysis was applied to the study of chess variants. Other modern chess masters like Susan Polgar and Alexander Alekhine also played and commented on different chess variants.

In the September 1933 issue of Chess Review, Alekhine offered the following comment:

Particularly in Asia I was interested in the number of different peoples that play chess, and also in the varieties of the game itself. It is there that chess probably originated. I found several simple forms, and others even more complicated than the game we know. It may be, in time, that we can combine the best features of the Oriental game with our chess. This would be a more natural evolution than adding new pieces and squares, or some of the other changes that have been proposed. I do not believe that chess needs any change at present, as it still holds new wonders, and will continue to do so for years to come.

==== The knighted chess family ====
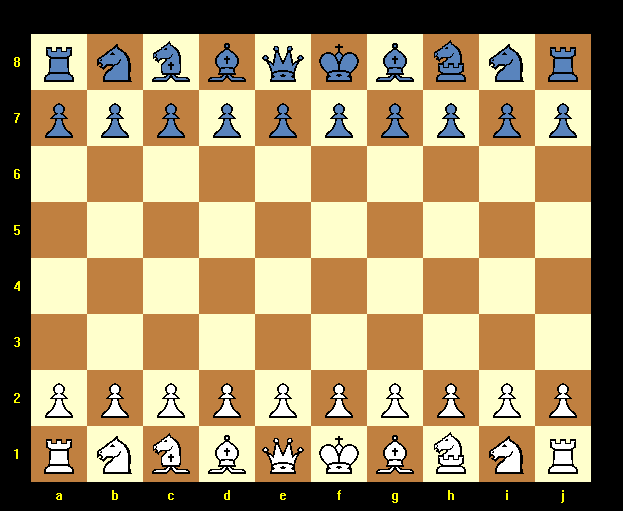
Capablanca chess setup

One family of European chess variants are referred to as knighted chess variants by Cazaux & Knowlton since these games use two new pieces that combine the powers of the knight with that of rook and bishop. They are all related to a game introduced by Italian chess player Pietro Carrera in his 1617 book Il Gioco de gli Scacchi (The Game of Chess). The game was played on a 10x8 board and used two new pieces Carrera called campione ("champion", called the chancellor in Capablanca chess) and centauro ("centaur", archbishop in Capablanca chess). The "champion" combines the movement of the rook and knight while the centaur combines the bishop and knight movements. These two new pieces were widely used in many later variants.

There were also various other lesser known European chess variants that also slightly enlarged the board and introduced new pieces. One of these was Duke of Rutland's chess, which used a 10x14 squares board with the following extra pieces: the concubine (combines rook and knight), two crowned rooks (rooks with the added power of taking a diagonal step), two extra bishops, an extra knight, and six extra pawns. This game became popular among several leading players of the time like André Danican Philidor and Abraham Janssen.

Another such variant was invented by Swedish king Gustav III (r. 1771–1792) which introduced the amazon piece (which has the powers of a queen and a knight). This new piece had previously been discussed by Italian authors who had called it the donnacavallo and this movement had also been granted to the queen in some forms of Russian chess. The 19th century saw further similar variants with extra pieces developed. Das Schachspiel, seine Gattungen und Abarten (The Game of Chess, its Types and Varieties, 1840) was the first book ever published to expressly explain chess variants. This book included different variants such as the kaiser's game (a 10x10 game with a bishop-knight and an amazon) and the sultan's game (which expands the kaiser game to 11x11 and adds a rook-knight piece).

Drawing on this tradition of larger boards and extra pieces, the Cuban chess master José Raúl Capablanca (1888–1942) developed his own "Capablanca chess" after play-testing various forms of the game with Edward Lasker. Capablanca chess attracted much attention due to its promotion by one of the world's greatest chess players at the time, but it still failed to reach widespread popularity.

The knighted chess family continued to add new variants well into the late 20th century. They include Gabriel Vicente Maura's modern chess, janus chess Seirawan chess, grand chess and Trice's chess. Most of these variants use one or both of the new Carrera/Capablanca pieces along with other modifications. There is also a variant which combines Chess960 with Capablanca chess known as Capablanca random chess.

==== Shuffled chess and Chess960 ====
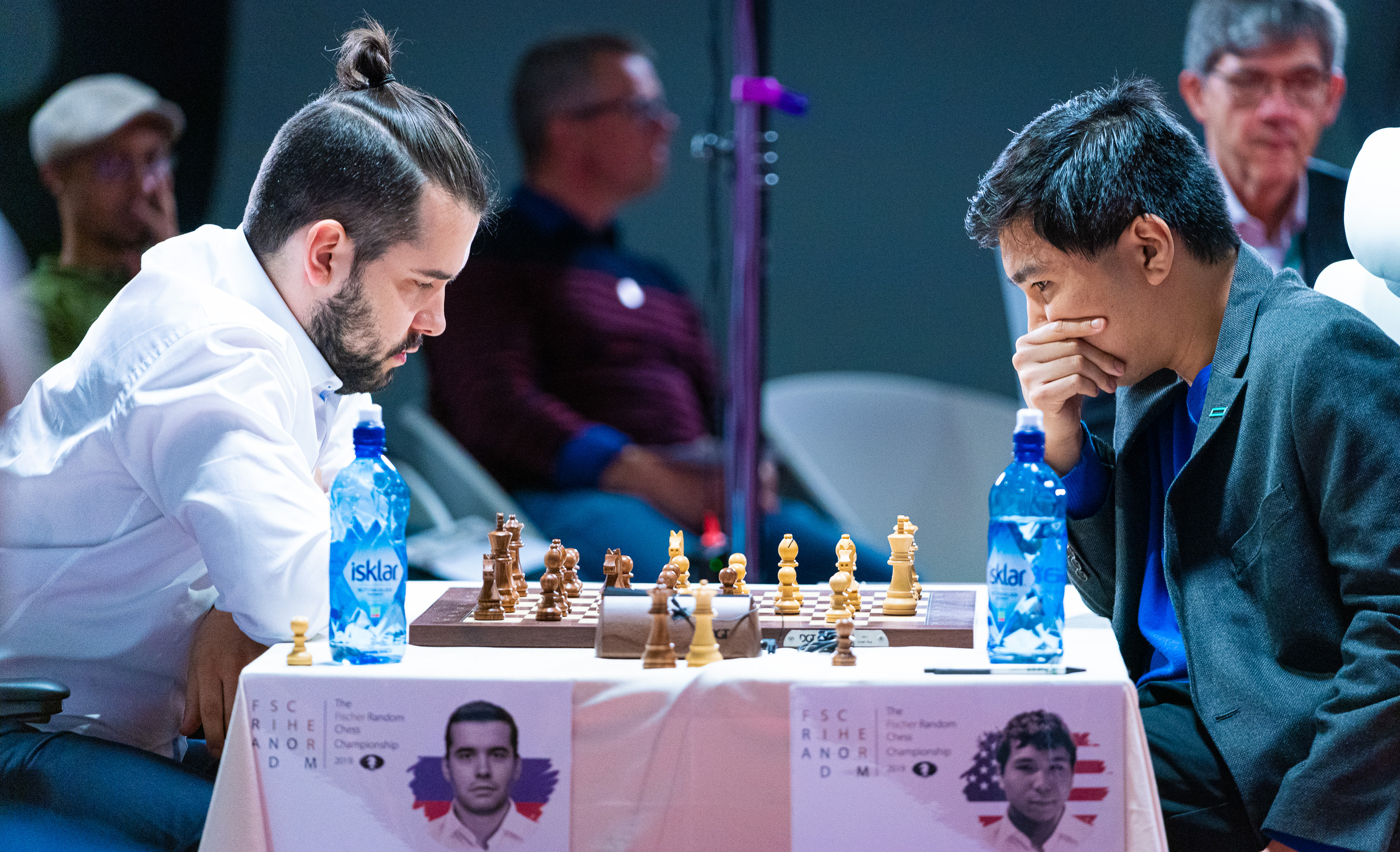
FIDE World FR Chess Championship 2019, Nepomniachtchi v Wesley So

American chess grandmaster Bobby Fischer was known for popularizing Chess960, also called Fischerandom. Chess960 randomizes the starting position of the pieces on the back ranks according to specific rules (creating 960 possible combinations). This randomized setup eliminates the possibility of preparing memorized opening repertoires, making players rely on pure analytical skill and creativity.

A similar kind of shuffled or randomized chess was first proposed by Dutch chess enthusiast van Zuylen van Nijevelt (1743–1826) in his La Supériorité aux Échecs (1792), as a way to prevent the memorization of repetitive opening theory. Bobby Fischer modified shuffle chess further with new rules and promoted it as a way to bring new life to chess. He once said in an interview that he wanted to keep the classic feel of the old game while also "making a change so the starting positions are mixed, so it's not degenerated down to memorization and prearrangement like it is today." The idea was further promoted by different figures such as H. Mountcastle who promoted a tournament of randomized chess at London's Patent Office Chess Club in 1911.

In 2008, FIDE added Chess960 to an appendix of the Laws of Chess, making it the only chess variant it has officially adopted. (Note: In 2008 FIDE added Chess960 rules to an appendix of the Handbook. This section is now classified under "Guidelines", indicating that the rules presented do not have the weight of FIDE law.) The first world championship officially sanctioned by FIDE, the FIDE World Fischer Random Chess Championship 2019, brought additional prominence to Chess960.

Contemporary Chess960 is the most widespread chess variant at the professional level, with various championships like the World Chess960 Championship and the Freestyle Chess G.O.A.T. Challenge played by many top grandmasters like Magnus Carlsen and Hikaru Nakamura.

==== Modern fairy chess ====
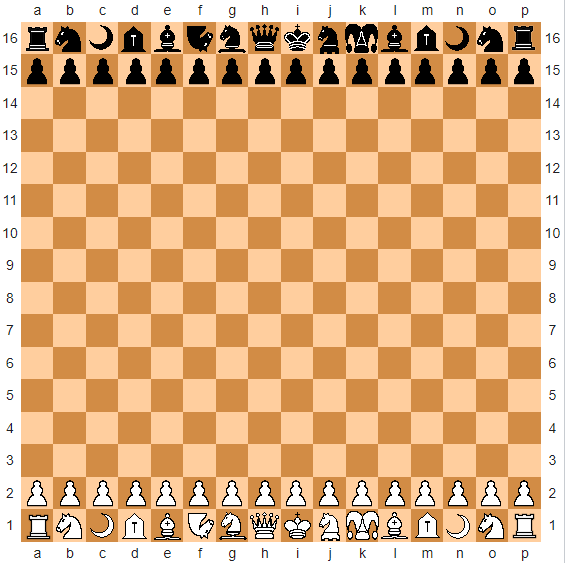
Chess on a really big board invented by Ralph Betza

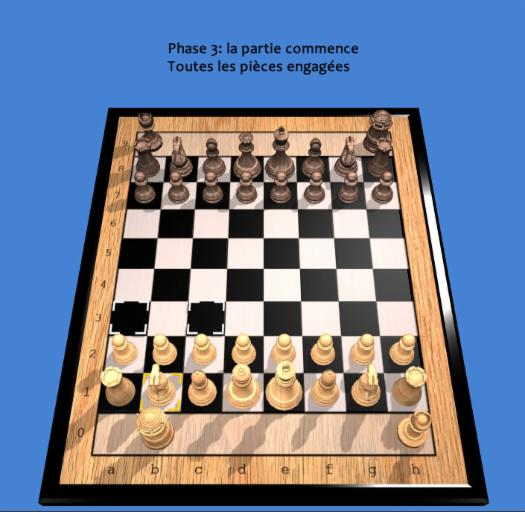
Musketeer chess, a fairy variant with numerous fairy pieces available for pre-game selection that can be introduced into the game from a storage row

One of the largest categories of modern chess variants is that of fairy chess, variations with different fairy pieces that move in unique ways. One of the earliest European variants augmented with significantly different pieces (other than the chancellor and archbishop which combine movements of already existing pieces) was arciscacchiere by Francesco Piacenza (1637–1687). Played on a 10x10 board, this game included two unique pieces, the centurion (moves like the medieval queen) and the decurion (leaps like a knight and also can move two squares horizontally, vertically or diagonally).

Similar fairy chess variants which used a slightly larger board and new unique pieces were introduced throughout the 18th and 19th century. One example was Ciccolini's chess which was introduced in Tentativo di un nuovo giuoco di scacchi (Attempt at a New Game of Chess, 1820).

Updated versions of courier chess were also introduced during this time, such as the modernized courierspiel of H.G. Albers (1821) which introduced the modern queen and improved the movements of the classic courier pieces. Another more recent update based on Albers' variant was developed Clément Begnis in 2011.

The 20th and 21st centuries saw many new fairy variants like the commercial Omega Chess. One contemporary game designer of numerous fairy chess variants is Jean-Louis Cazaux. His variants include Shako (which incorporates a cannon inspired by xiangqi), Metamachy and Wild Tamerlane. Cazaux has also written various books on the history of chess and chess variants. Metamachy is also one of the few contemporary fairy chess variants that has had a whole book dedicated to it, Cazaux's Traité Pratique de Métamachie (Pionissimo, 2012).

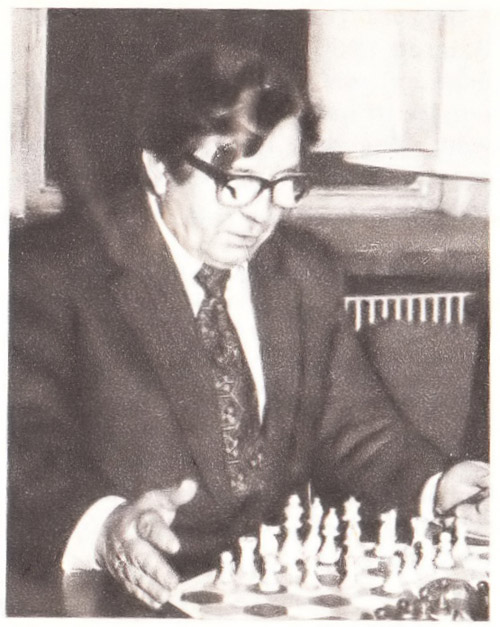
Gliński demonstrating his hexagonal chess

==== Other modern variants ====
Another modern chess variant that achieved a modest level of popularity and even saw some tournament play is Gliński's hexagonal chess. Władysław Gliński introduced his variant of hexagonal chess in 1936, which has been called "probably the most widely played of the hexagonal chess games." The game was popular in Eastern Europe, especially Poland. At one point, there were over half a million players with more than 130,000 board games sold. Gliński's book Rules of Hexagonal Chess was published in 1973. Gliński's game is only one in a family of hexagonal chess games which includes numerous other variants that use boards composed of hexagons. The first hexagonal chess variant was introduced by Thomas Hanmer Coughton in 1853. A slightly later commercial variant called Hexagonia was introduced by John Jacques & Son in 1864.

Another 20th century innovation that transposed chess into a new board was Raumschach (German for "space chess"), the earliest well documented form of Three-dimensional chess. Raumschach was designed by German mathematician Ferdinand Maack (1861–1930) in the early 1900s. After much testing, Maack settled on two game variations, one "four level game" on a 4x4x4 space and a "five level game" on a 5x5x5 space. The five level game introduced a unique three-dimensional chess piece called the unicorn, which moves through the corners of its cubic cell. Maack promoted the game with demonstrations, articles, a journal and pamphlets. He also founded the Hamburg Raumschach Club (possibly 1909), which remained active until WW2. Members included chess problemists like Hans Klüver and Willibald Roese.

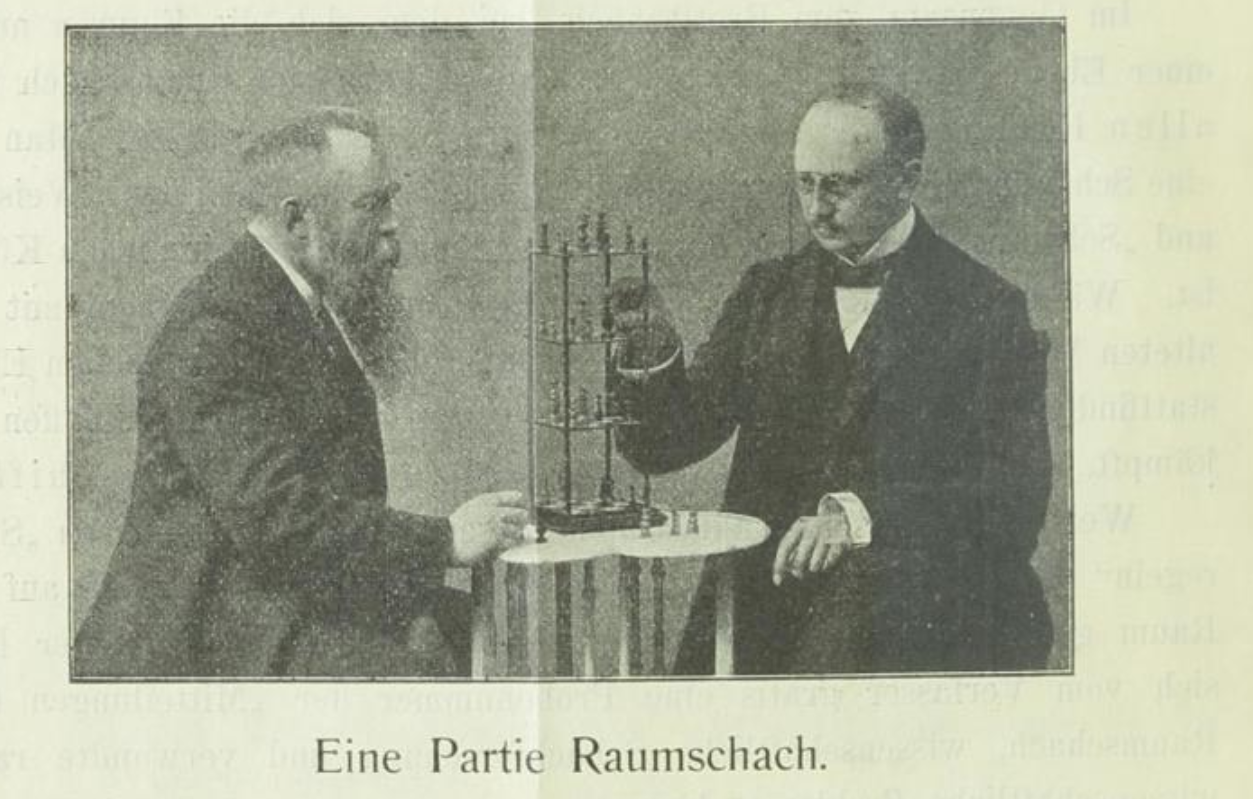
Raumschach game from Maack's Spielregeln zum Raumschach (1913)

Other individuals notable for creating multiple chess variants include V. R. Parton (best known for Alice chess), Ralph Betza (creator of Avalanche chess), Philip M. Cohen and George R. Dekle Sr.

Some board game designers, notable for works across a wider range of board games, have also created modern chess variants. These include Robert Abbott (Baroque chess) and Andy Looney (Martian chess).

The rise of online chess platforms like chess.com made the exploration of chess variants more accessible for contemporary players. There are now multiple websites where many chess variants can be played online.

== Types of variants ==
Chess variants derived from orthodox modern chess can be grouped into various categories according to which changes are added or altered.

The table below details some, but not all, of the ways in which variants can differ from the orthodox game:

Changes from orthodox chess	Examples
Different starting position	Chess960 (also known as Fischer Random) – starting position randomly selected from 960 possible options; Transcendental chess – the starting positions are randomized, but unlike Chess960, black and white positions do not mirror each other and so are asymmetrical.
Non-standard pieces (fairy pieces)	Capablanca chess and related variations (Grand chess, Seirawan chess, Capablanca random etc.) which use archbishop and chancellor pieces; Baroque chess – each piece has a different move ability; Omega chess; Chess with different armies (Betza's Chess)
Different rules	Crazyhouse – any captured piece can be "dropped" back on the board as one's own in any empty square (as in traditional shogi).; Alternative pawn movements, such as berolina pawns and torpedo pawns (which can move two spaces at all times); Hostage chess – captured pieces are held in the capturer's "prison", and can dropped back into play by the opponent (who must return a piece in exchange).; Marseillais chess (or two-move chess) – After the first one move turn of the game by white, each player moves twice per turn.; Chessplus – two pieces can be combined into one piece that uses both move abilities
Non-standard number of players	Numerous forms of four-player chess; Three-player chess
Multiple boards	Alice chess – pieces switch between the two boards when they move; Bughouse – uses the drop rule for captured pieces; played by four players on two boards
Different victory conditions	Three-check chess – victory can be achieved by three checks as well as checkmate; King-of-the-hill – victory condition is to place one's king in one of four central squares; Losing chess – the objective is to lose all one's pieces
Asymmetrical armies	Maharajah and the Sepoys – a 12th-century Indian variant that pits a single powerful "maharaja" against a whole army.; Dunsany's chess – pits a regular chess army versus a large army consisting only of pawns; Handicap chess – armies adjusted based on player strength
Different board size	Double chess – played on a 16×12 board with two full armies; Courier chess (historical) and its many modern variations played on a 12x8 board; Chess on a really big board – Played on a 16x16 board with six additional fairy pieces
Different board shape	Circular chess – a circular board consisting of four rings of sixteen squares each.; Spherical chess – a family of variants played on a sphere.; Infinite chess – the board is unbounded
Board other than lattice of squares	Various forms of hexagonal chess, such as Gliński's hexagonal chess; Triangular chess – played on a board of 96 triangles; Rhombic Chess – played on a hexagonal board with 72 rhombi
Three-dimensional chess	Gary Gygax's Dragonchess
Players have incomplete information regarding the game state	Kriegspiel – players cannot see the pieces of their opponent, and have to deduce or guess where they are likely to be; Dark chess (or Fog of War chess) – players see only squares of the board that are attacked by their pieces
Elements of chance	Dice chess – dice rolls determine which pieces can move on a turn; Knightmare Chess – a commercial variant which uses a shuffled deck of cards that contain unique rule changes
New games played with chess equipment	Arimaa; Game of the Amazons; Breakthrough

== Play ==
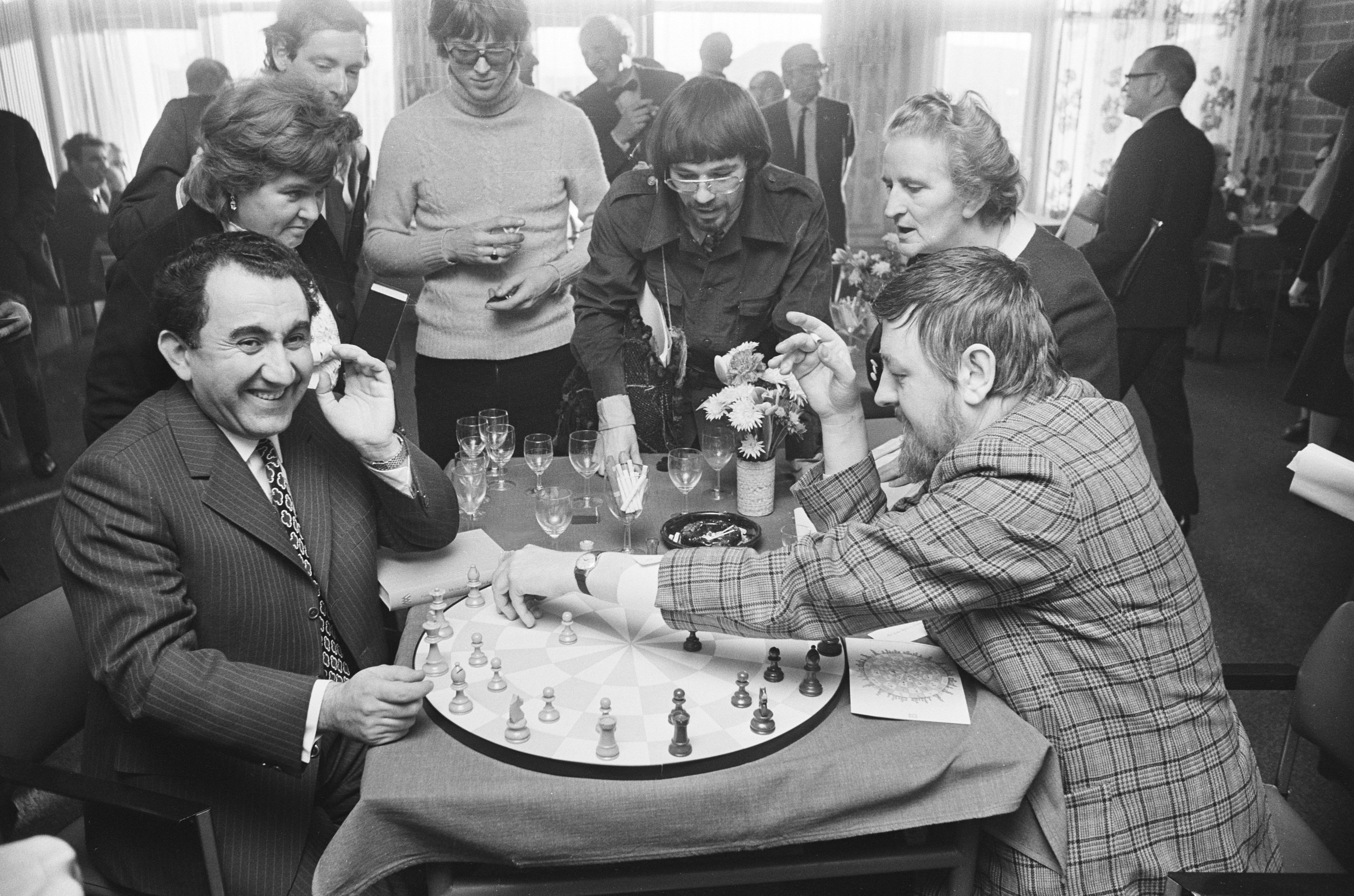
Tigran Petrosian and J. H. Donner playing a circular board variant in 1971

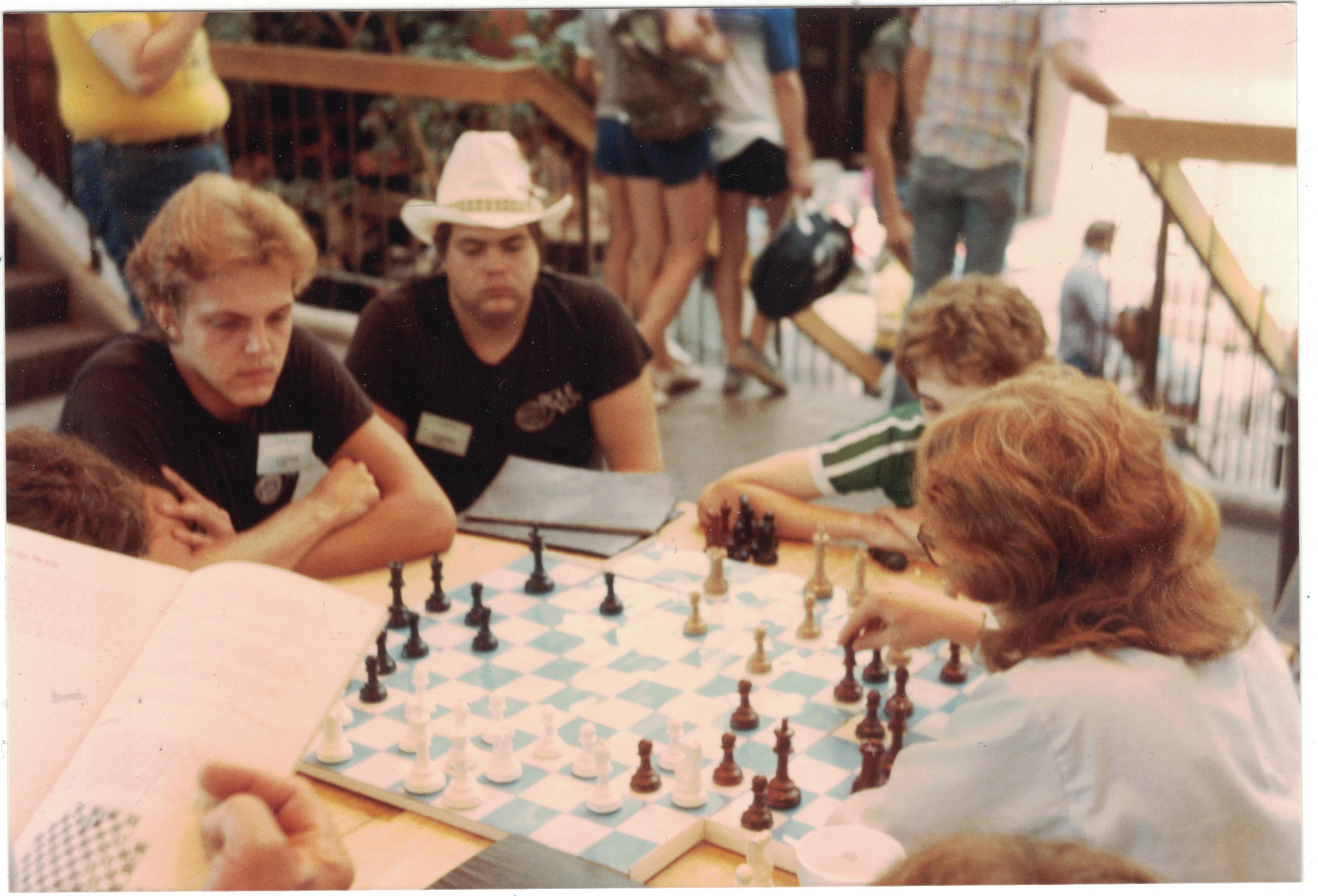
Four-player chess variant at Gen Con 1983

While chess, shogi, and xiangqi have traditional professional circuits as well as many organised tournaments for amateurs, most play of modern Western chess variants is predominately on a casual basis, with some exceptions.

A few variants have had significant tournaments however. Several Gliński's hexagonal chess tournaments were played at the height of the variant's popularity in the 1970s and 1980s. Chess960 has also been the subject of tournaments, including in 2018 an "unofficial world championship" between reigning World Chess Champion Magnus Carlsen and fellow high-ranking Grandmaster Hikaru Nakamura, and world championships sanctioned by FIDE in 2019 and 2022.

Likewise, Crazyhouse has seen prize-funded unofficial world championship tournaments with top grandmasters and experts of the game on Chess.com and Lichess. The Mind Sports Olympiad has also held competitions on several different chess variants.

Several internet chess servers facilitate live play of popular variants, including Chess.com, Lichess, and the Free Internet Chess Server. The software packages Zillions of Games and Fairy-Max have been programmed to support many chess variants.

Some chess engines are also able to play a handful of variants; for instance, the version of Stockfish implemented on Lichess is able to play Crazyhouse, King-of-the-hill, Three-check chess, Atomic chess, Horde chess, and Racing Kings. The AI included in Zillions of Games is able to play almost any variant correctly programmed within it to a reasonable standard.

Some variants, such as 5D Chess with Multiverse Time Travel, are implausible or even impossible to play physically and exist primarily as video games.

== Analysis and study ==
=== Notation ===
Play in most chess variants is sufficiently similar to chess that games can be recorded with algebraic chess notation, although additions to this are often required. For example, the third dimension in Millennium 3D Chess means that move notation needs to include the level number, as well as the rank and file—N2g3 means a knight move to the g3 square on the second level.

Meanwhile, when fairy chess pieces are used, notation requires assigning letters for those pieces.

=== Scholarship and cataloguing ===
Various publications have been written regarding chess variants. Variant Chess magazine was published from 1990 to 2010, being an official publication of the British Chess Variants Society from 1997. This outlined and introduced multiple variants, as well as containing in-depth analyses. The Italian association of heterodox chess (L'Associazione Italiana Scacchi Eterodossi, A.I.S.E., founded 1978 by Mario Leoncini) also published material on many chess variants. The more recent Abstract Games magazine also discusses chess variants.

A leading figure in the field was David Pritchard, who authored several books on the topic. Most significantly, he compiled an encyclopedia of variants which outlined thousands of different games. Following Pritchard's death in 2005, the second edition of the encyclopedia was completed and published by John Beasley under the title The Classified Encyclopedia of Chess Variants.

A recent overview of historical and some modern variants was published under the title of A World of Chess in 2017.

The Chess Variant Pages website created by Hans Bodlaender in 1995 includes a constantly expanding catalogue of variants. The site includes a wide-ranging collection of chess variant rules and an encyclopedia of fairy pieces.

=== Computer variant chess ===
	a	b	c	d	e	f
6	a6	b6	c6 black king	d6	e6	f6	6
5	a5	b5	c5 black knight	d5	e5 white knight	f5	5
4	a4 black rook	b4	c4 black pawn	d4 white queen	e4	f4 black pawn	4
3	a3	b3	c3 black pawn	d3 white pawn	e3	f3	3
2	a2	b2	c2 white pawn	d2	e2 white pawn	f2	2
1	a1	b1 white rook	c1	d1 white king	e1	f1 white rook	1
	a	b	c	d	e	f

Final position in a Los Alamos chess game between MANIAC I (white) and a chess beginner (black). MANIAC I managed to checkmate its inexperienced opponent in the first instance of a computer defeating a human at a chess-like game.

A few chess variants have been the subject of significant computational analysis. Los Alamos chess, a 6×6 variant, was created in 1956 expressly for computers, its simplicity meant that it was possible for the MANIAC I computer to play it, with a victory over a beginner player the first instance of a computer winning a chess-like game against human opposition. Conversely, Arimaa was developed in 2003 to be deliberately resistant to computer analysis while easy for human players, though computers were able to comprehensively surpass human players by 2015.

While solving chess has not yet been achieved, some variants have been found to be simple enough to be solved through computer analysis. The 5×5 Gardner's Minichess variant has been weakly solved as a draw, and a lengthy analysis of losing chess managed to weakly solve this as a win for white.

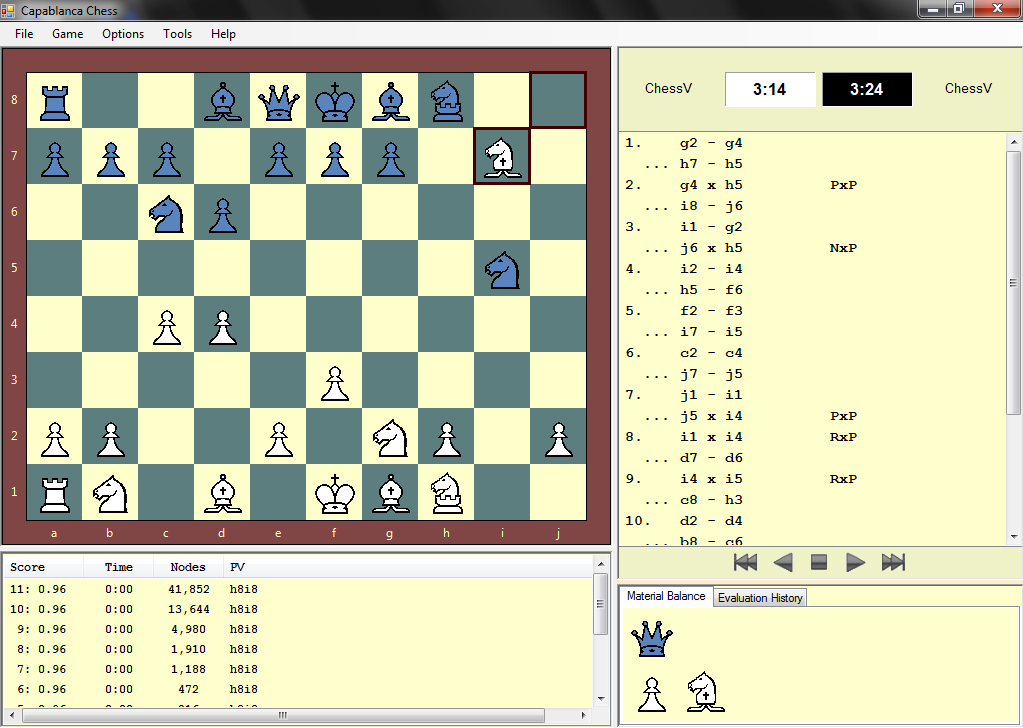
A Capablanca chess variant played on ChessV

Several computer programs have been developed which can play numerous chess variants and are used by the chess variant community. They include the commercial Zillions of Games, and the free and open source ChessV, Fairy-Max, and Fairy Stockfish.

A more recent study on Chess variants using Alphazero was performed by Google Deepmind's Nenad Tomasev, Ulrich Paquet, and Demis Hassabis, together with GM Vladimir Kramnik. The study looked at several variant chess rule changes, including: no-castling chess, torpedo pawns (pawns can move by 1 or 2 squares anywhere), pawn backwards (pawns can move 1 square backwards as well), and sideways pawns (Pawns can also move laterally by 1 square).

Kramnik offered various opinions on these variants, for example, he considers no-castling chess to be a dynamic variation which would alter opening preparation extensively. Regarding torpedo pawns, Kramnik writes that this variation makes passed pawns "in particular a very strong asset and the value of pawns changes based on the circumstances and closer to the endgame. All of the attacking opportunities increase and this strongly favours the side with the initiative, which makes taking initiative a crucial part of the game. Pawns are very fast, so less of a strategical asset and much more tactical instead. The game becomes more tactical and calculative compared to standard chess." When it comes to pawns that can move backwards, Kramnik writes that this variant "allows for more fluid and flexible pawn structures and could potentially be interesting for players who like such strategic maneuvering."

== Equipment ==
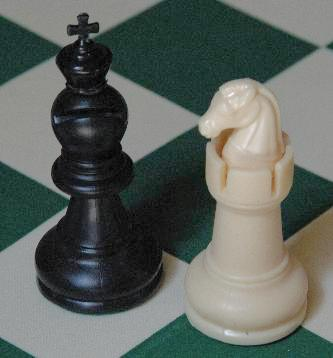
One design for the archbishop and chancellor pieces

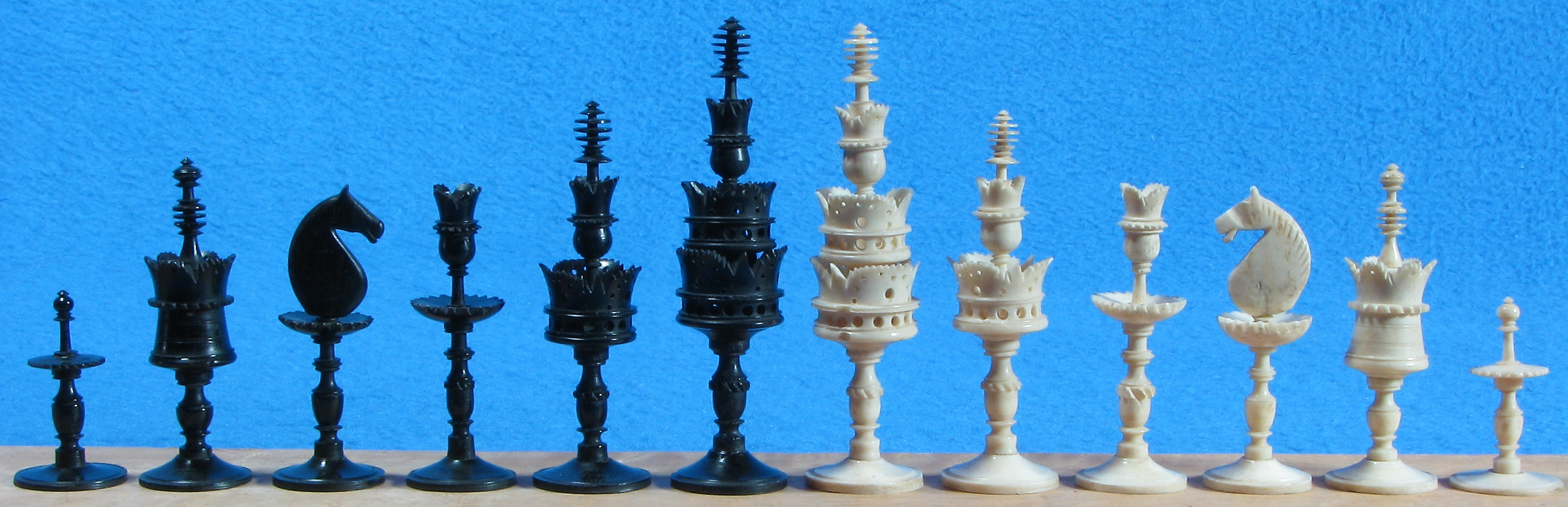
Selenus chess pieces

Standard chess sets may be used for the classic pieces, but players must also acquire four new distinct looking chessmen to represent the black and white chancellor and archbishops. Specialized chessmen created for these types of variants can be found in hobbyist, board game shops and online craft shops. Some knighted chess variants were produced as full chess sets, like Gothic Chess, and Omega Chess, but most of these are hard to find and out of print.

As such, most hobbyists make their own custom sets. One can also alter, customize or paint regular chess pieces to make them appear distinctive. Another option would be to use specific chessmen from chess sets made in a very different style than the standard Staunton chess set, like the English Barleycorn, Lund pattern or Selenus styles. Other options include using RPG figurines and 3D printed pieces.

The knighted variants which make use of standard 8x8 chessboards like Seirawan chess and Neo-chess pose no problem for players seeking to try these variants on their common chess boards. Other variants require customized boards which are not easily available (such as 10x8). For 10x10 board variants, an international draughts board can be used as a stand in, while for 9x9 variants, a Shogi board can be used. One can also buy inexpensive chess boards made of card stock, vinyl or mousepad material and cut them into pieces which can then be reassembled to accommodate different board sizes.

== Chess variants in fiction ==
Chess variants have been invented in various fiction. In The Chessmen of Mars author Edgar Rice Burroughs describes Jetan which depicts a war between two races of Martian. An appendix fully defines the rules of the game.

More commonly specifics of fictional variants are not detailed in the original works, though several have been codified into playable games by fans. An example of this is Tri-Dimensional Chess from Star Trek. On-screen play was not conducted to any specific rules, but a comprehensive rulebook has been since developed. Another well known example of fictional chess-like game are the Star Wars holochess, or dejarik.

Chess boxing, a hybrid sport of chess and boxing, was depicted in Froid Équateur, a 1992 comic by Enki Bilal and was developed into a real sport in the early 21st century.

Fictional chess variants can involve fantastical or dangerous elements. The Chessmen of Mars also describes a form of Jetan where the pieces are human beings and captures are replaced by fights to the death between them. The Doctor Who episode "The Wedding of River Song" depicts "Live Chess", which introduces potentially lethal electric currents into the game.

== See also ==
- List of chess variants
- Fairy Chess Review
- Shogi variant
- Xiangqi variant
- Janggi variant
