= The Chess Variant Pages =

Website about chess variants

The Chess Variant Pages is a non-commercial website devoted to chess variants. It was created by Hans Bodlaender in 1995. The site is "run by hobbyists for hobbyists" and is "the most wide-ranging and authoritative web site on chess variants".

The site contains a large compilation of games with published rules. The aims of the site are to educate readers about chess variants, encourage gameplay, and provide a place for free discussion. The site has featured game competitions as well as variant design competitions, and provides facilities for publishing documents. Numerous files are available for playing variants using the Zillions of Games proprietary software engine. The site also features The Game Courier software developed by Fergus Duniho which can be used to play almost any variant. There is also an extensive encyclopedia of fairy chess pieces.

Other contributing editorial volunteers include (alphabetically by last name): Peter Aronson, Jean-Louis Cazaux, Antoine Fourrière, Ed Friedlander, Ben Good, David Howe, Joe Joyce, Glenn Overby II, Tony Quintanilla, and Peter Spicer. Early editors included John William Brown, Tom Cook, Pavel Tikhomirov, and Vu Q. Vo.
