= David Pritchard (chess player) =

British chess player and writer (1919–2005)

David B. Pritchard
- Born: 19 October 1919
- Died: 12 December 2005 (aged 86); London, England
- Occupation: Writer
- Writing career
- Subjects: Games, chess, chess variants
- Notable work: The Encyclopedia of Chess Variants

David Brine Pritchard (19 October 1919 – 12 December 2005) was a British chess player, chess writer and indoor games consultant. He gained pre-eminence as an indoor games and mind sports consultant, a role that he in effect created. A natural games player, it was to him that inventors or publishers would turn to organise a championship of a new game, write about it or generally promote it.

Though nearly a million copies of his chess books have been sold, Pritchard is best known for authoring The Encyclopedia of Chess Variants, in which he describes more than 1400 different variants.

In addition to authoring books on games, Pritchard was editor of Games & Puzzles magazine from 1972 to 1981. He was also a games director for the Mind Sports Organisation, and president of the British Chess Variants Society.

== Biography ==
During and after the Second World War Pritchard was an RAF pilot who served mainly in the Far East, obtaining the rank of squadron leader. During his RAF service he won the chess championships of Singapore in 1954–1955 and Malaya in 1955.

As a chess player in Britain, Pritchard had some successes, beating British grandmasters Jonathan Penrose and Tony Miles, winning the Southern Counties Championship, and winning multiple Battle of Britain Chess Competitions—an organisation for which he was president. Pritchard's interests extended beyond chess to other indoor games.

Pritchard married British Ladies Chess Champion Elaine Saunders in 1952. They had one daughter, Wanda, and, at the time of Pritchard's death, five grandchildren.

== Writer ==
Pritchard's earliest writings were chess texts for beginners. Begin Chess and The Right Way to Play Chess, first published in the 1950s, have since sold hundreds of thousands of copies.

Pritchard also wrote on other games, such as go, shogi, xiangqi and mahjong. He edited two magazines, The Gamer and Games & Puzzles, with a similarly broad scope and served as games director of the Mind Sports Olympiad.

Pritchard served as president of the British Chess Variants Society and invented several such games. The Encyclopaedia of Chess Variants (1994), which discusses more than 1400 different variants, is considered to be his magnum opus and the definitive work in the field. This was followed by Popular Chess Variants (2000), covering 20 games in greater depth. A second edition of The Encyclopaedia of Chess Variants was close to completion at the time of Pritchard's death. Following work by John Beasley it was published in 2007 with the title The Classified Encyclopedia of Chess Variants.

=== Archival material ===
Five boxes of archival material related to Pritchard's research for The Encyclopedia of Chess Variants are held by the Ken Whyld Library of the Swiss Museum of Games.

== Books ==
The Classified Encyclopedia of Chess Variants, second edition

- The Right Way to Play Chess (orig pub. 1950; 2000), ISBN 1-58574-046-2
- Play Chess (1960), ISBN 978-0716000266
- Begin Chess (1970), ISBN 978-0-7160-2100-1
- Go: A Guide to the Game (1973), ISBN 978-0571099559
- Puzzles and Teasers for Everyone (Ed., 1974) ISBN 978-0716006046
- Modern Board Games (Ed., 1975), ISBN 978-0860020592
- Oriental Board Games (booklet, 1977), ISBN 978-0715805244
- Popular Indoor Games (1977), ASIN B000PQ50XG
- Puzzles and Teasers for the Easy Chair (orig pub. 1977; 1988), ISBN 0-7160-0796-7
- Brain Games: The World's Best Games for Two (1982), ISBN 0-14-005682-3
- Five-Minute Games (1984), ISBN 978-0713514940
- Puzzles for Geniuses (1984), ISBN 0-13-744632-2
- Puzzles for Geniuses: Vol II (with Darryl Francis Pritchard, 1984), ASIN B000OIWREU
- First Moves: How to Start a Chess Game (1986), ISBN 0-06-463718-2
- Beginning Chess (1992), ISBN 0-451-17438-0
- The Encyclopedia of Chess Variants (1994), ISBN 0-9524142-0-1
- The Family Book of Games (1994), ISBN 1-86019-021-9
- Card Games (booklet, 1995), ISBN 0-7136-3816-8
- Patience Games (with David Parlett, 1996), ISBN 0-7136-4208-4
- Popular Chess Variants (2000), ISBN 0-7134-8578-7
- Honeycomb Chess (with Douglas Graham Reid, 2002), ISBN 0-9524142-1-X
- The New Mahjong: The International Game (2004), ISBN 978-0716021643
- A Family Book of Games (2007), ISBN 1-902407-52-0
- Teach Yourself Mahjong (2007), ISBN 0-07-147882-5
- The Classified Encyclopedia of Chess Variants (2007), ISBN 0-9555168-0-3

== British Chess Variants Society ==
The British Chess Variants Society (or BCVS) was an association of chess variant players and developers formally active between 1997 and 2010, and Pritchard was its inaugural president.

Starting in 1996, the Society (at the time only provisionally constituted) published Variant Chess (ISSN 0958-8248), a quarterly chess variant magazine. (The magazine predated the formation of the Society, having been established by chess writer George Jelliss in 1990.) The Society also established a chess variant library containing some 120 subject items in a variety of languages.
