= Fairy chess =

Chess compositions with nonstandard rules (e.g. with fairy pieces)

Oniţiu, Petrović, Dawson & Fox
1st Pr. Kniest TT. 1930
FIDE Album 1914-1944/III

Position: a8 black upside-down queen, f7 black upside-down queen, a2 black pawn, h2 black upside-down queen, a1 black king, c1 white king, h1 white upside-down queen

Mate in 8 (with grasshoppers Ga8, f7, h2 and h1)

Solution: 1.Gh3 Gh4 2.Gh5 Gh6 3.Gh7 Gh8 4.Ge7 Gd7 5.Gc7 Gb7 6.Ga7+ Ga6 7.Ga5+ Ga4 8.Ga3#

Fairy chess is the area of chess composition in which there are some changes to the rules of chess. It may involve changes to the board, pieces, or rules to express an idea or theme impossible in orthodox chess. An altered piece used in fairy chess is known as a fairy chess piece. The term fairy chess was introduced by Henry Tate in 1914. Thomas R. Dawson (1889–1951), the "father of fairy chess", invented many fairy pieces and new conditions. He was also problem editor of Fairy Chess Review (1930–1951).

Although the term fairy chess is sometimes used for games, it is more usually applied in the context of problems. Variations on chess intended to create complete, playable games are more typically referred to as chess variants.

== Types of fairy chess problems ==
Types of changed rules in fairy chess problems include:

- New stipulations: The alterations most used by fairy chess players, like Thomas Dawson, are new stipulations about mate instead of a direct mate stipulation. Many of them were invented and some became established. Selfmates and helpmates are, in the 21st century, often considered to be orthodox (not fairy) stipulations. Among others are reflexmates and various types of seriesmovers.
- New conditions: Encompassing all changes of rules including rules for captures, checks, checkmates, and general movement abilities. Many were invented; some became established, including Circe chess, Madrasi chess, Andernach chess, monochromatic chess, patrol chess, Einstein chess, and Descartes chess.
- New chess pieces: Conventional chess pieces are generalized in many ways into fairy chess pieces, such as grasshopper, nightrider, and cannon.
- Different boards: One can vary board size from 8×8 to other sizes (10×10, 8×10, or 8×8 unusual board shapes, etc.) or use different geometries: cylinder (vertical and horizontal), anchor ring or torus and others.

There are fairy chess problems that combine some of these changed rules.

All entries in the world championships and in the FIDE Albums are divided into eight sections: directmates (2-movers, 3-movers and more-movers), endgame studies, helpmates, selfmates, fairy chess, retros, and mathematical problems.

== Fairy chess literature ==
Books and pamphlets devoted to fairy chess:

- Chess Eccentricities by G. H. Verney (1885)
- Chancellor Chess by B. R. Foster (1886)
- The 20th Century Retractor by Mrs. W. J. Baird (1907)
- Space Chess publications of Dr. Ferdinand Maack and the Hamburg Space Chess Club (1908–1919)
- 150 Schachkuriositäten by Problematicus (1910)
- Retrograde Analysis by T. R. Dawson and W. Hundsdorfer (1915)
- Fata Morgana by Dr. E. Birgfeld (1922)
- On Retraction Chess Problems by Dr. Niels Hoeg (1927)
- Hexagonal Chess by H. D. Baskerville (1929)
- Chess Chimes from Prague by Z. Mach (1933)
- Caissa's Wild Roses by T. R. Dawson (1935)
- C. M. Fox, His Problems by T. R. Dawson (1936)
- Caissa's Wild Roses in Clusters by T. R. Dawson (1937)
- Ultimate Themes by T. R. Dawson (1938)
- Une Nouvelle Invention by Znosko-Borovsky (1947)
- Caissa's Fairy Tales by T. R. Dawson (1947)
- Am Rande des Schachbretts by Dr. Karl Fabel (1947)
- Einführlung in das Märchenschach by Hermann Stapff (1948)
- Caissas Märchen translated by Dr. Massmann (1949)
- Einzüger Rekorde by N. Petrovic (April 1950)
- Les Jeux d'Echecs Non-orthodoxes by J. Boyer (1951, Paris)
- Elemente des Märchenschachs by T. R. D., translated by W. Karsch and Dr. J. Niemann (1953)
- Nouveaux Jeux d'Echecs Non-orthodoxes by J. Boyer (1954, Paris)
- Rund um das Schachbrett by Dr. Karl Fabel (1955)
- 32 Personaggi e un Autore by L. Ceriani (1955)
- Are There Any? by G. F. Anderson (1958)
- Kurioses Schach by Dr. Karl Fabel (1960)
- Der Jäger im Schachspiel by Theodor Steudel (1960)
- La Genesi Delle Posizioni by L. Ceriani (1961)
- Doppelzugschach by H. Klüver (1963)
- Faschingsschach der Welt by Hans Klüver (1963)
- Ye Faerie Chesseman by D. L. Miller (1965)
- Schach und Zahl by Bonsdorff, Fabel, and Riihimaa (1966)
- Maximum Tables by The Fairy Chess Correspondence Circle (1967)
- A Guide to Fairy Chess by A. S. M. Dickins (1967)
- Chess Variations by John Gollon (1968)
- Chess Unlimited by C. Kemp and Dr. K. Fabel (1969)
- Records in One-Mover Chess Construction Tasks by W. Cross and A. S. M. Dickins (1970)
- An Album of Fairy Chess edited by A. S. M. Dickins (1970)
- The Serieshelpmate by John Rice and A. S. M. Dickins (1971)

Periodicals devoted to fairy chess:

- The Problemist Fairy Supplement (August 1930 – June 1936)
- Fairy Chess Review (August 1936 – April 1958)
- Feenschach, edited by W. Karsch
