= Thomas Rayner Dawson =

English chess problemist (1889–1951)

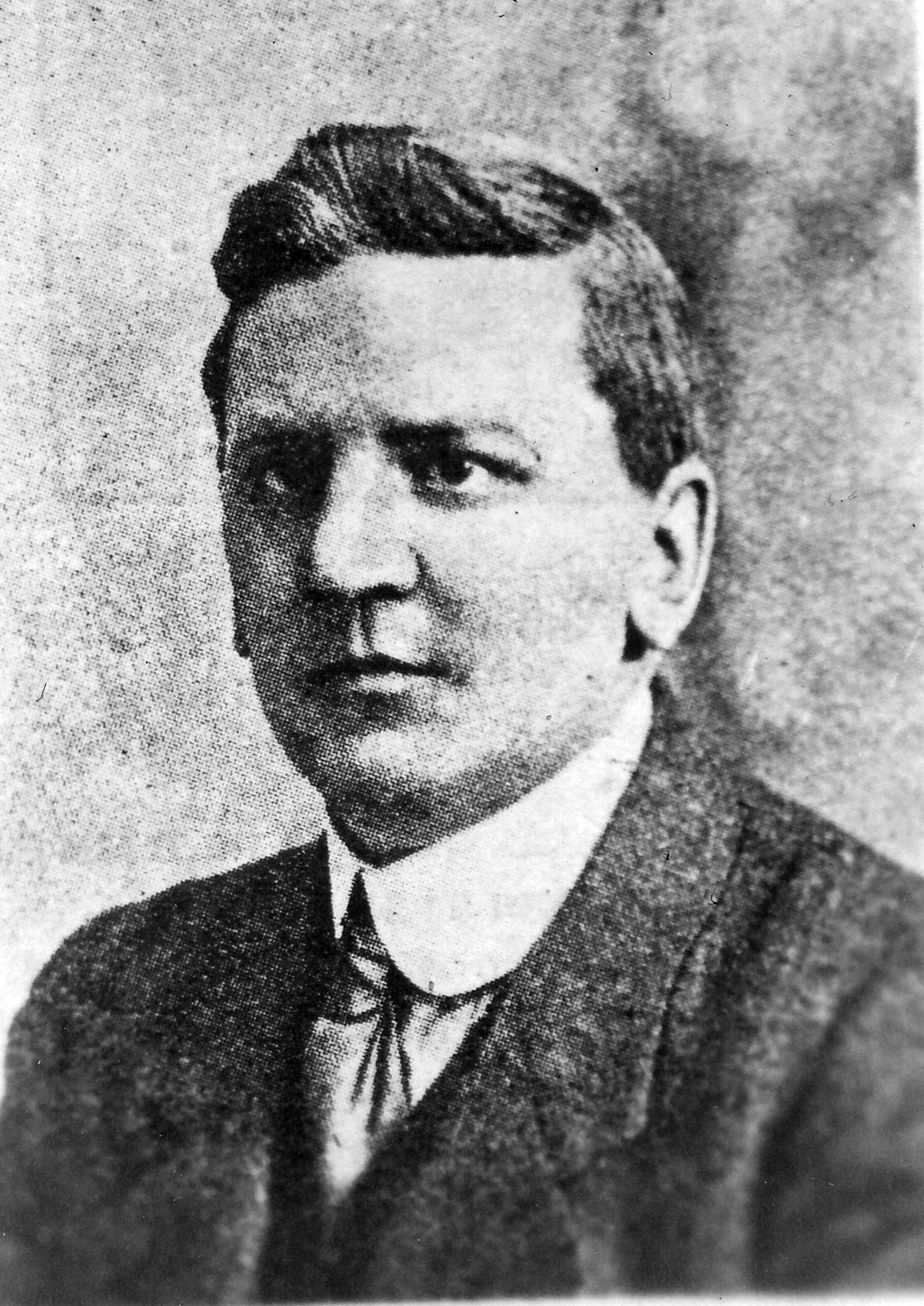
- Born: Thomas Rayner Dawson; 28 November 1889; Leeds, England
- Died: 16 December 1951 (aged 62); Surrey, England
- Known for: Chess problem compositions Fairy chess Dawson's Chess

Thomas Rayner Dawson (28 November 1889 – 16 December 1951) was an English chess problemist and is acknowledged as "the father of Fairy Chess". He invented many fairy pieces and new conditions. He introduced the popular fairy pieces grasshopper, nightrider, and many other fairy chess ideas.

== Career ==
Dawson published his first problem, a two-mover, in 1907. His chess problem compositions include 5,320 fairies, 885 directmates, 97 selfmates, and 138 endings. 120 of his problems have been awarded prizes and 211 honourably mentioned or otherwise commended. He cooperated in chess composition with Charles Masson Fox.

Dawson was founder-editor (1922–1931) of The Problemist, the journal of the British Chess Problem Society. He subsequently produced The Fairy Chess Review (1930–1951), which began as The Problemist Fairy Chess Supplement. At the same time he edited the problem pages of The British Chess Magazine (1931–1951).

=== Motivation and personality ===
From The Oxford Companion to Chess:

His genius did not set him apart from his fellows; he could find time for casual visitors, and would explain his ideas to a tyro with patience, modesty, and kindness. Although he won many tourney prizes much of his work was designed to encourage others, to enlarge the small band of fairy problem devotees. He composed less for fame than to amuse himself, confessing to another composer "We do these things for ourselves alone."

== Sample problems ==
Fairy Chess Review, 1947

Position: a5 white knight, f2 black pawn, a1 black king, c1 white king

Series-helpmate in 17 moves
Black makes 17 moves, then White makes a move, delivering checkmate.

Solution: 1. Ka2 2. Ka3 3. Kb4 4. Kc3 5. Kd3 6. Ke2 7. Ke1 8. f1R 9. Rf2 10. Ke2 11. Kd3 12. Kc3 13. Kb4 14. Ka3 15. Ka2 16. Ka1 17. Ra2 Nb3#

Onitiu, Petrović, Dawson & Fox
1st Pr. Kniest TT. 1930, FIDE Album 1914–44/III

Position: a8 black upside-down queen, f7 black upside-down queen, a2 black pawn, h2 black upside-down queen, a1 black king, c1 white king, h1 white upside-down queen

Mate in 8
Grasshoppers are on a8, f7, h2, and h1.

This problem is a strange case of coincidence: thematic tourney prescript problems with grasshoppers without limiting number of the moves. The identical problem was sent independently by four composers.

Solution: 1. Gh3 Gh4 2. Gh5 Gh6 3. Gh7 Gh8 4. Ge7 Gd7 5. Gc7 Gb7 6. Ga7+ Ga6 7. Ga5+ Ga4 8. Ga3#

== Publications ==
- Caissa's Playthings a series of articles in Cheltenham Examiner (1913)
- Retrograde Analysis, with Wolfgang Hundsdorfer (1915)
- Fata Morgana, with Birgfeld, Nanz, Massmann, Pauly (1922)
- Asymmetry, with W. Pauly (1928)
- Seventy Five Retros (1928)
- Caissa's Wild Roses (1935)
- C. M. Fox, His Problems (1936)
- Caissa's Wild Roses in Clusters (1937)
- Ultimate Themes (1938)
- Caissa's Fairy Tales (1947)

The last five titles were collected as Five Classics of Fairy Chess, Dover Publications (1973), ISBN 978-0-486-22910-2.
