= Hrvoje Bartolović =

Croatian chess problemist (1932–2005)

H. Bartolović, 1 Prize Magasinet 1956

Position: c8 black bishop, g8 white knight, e7 black bishop, f6 black rook, e5 white bishop, g5 black king, b4 white rook, c4 white queen, h4 white knight, b2 white king, d2 black pawn, d1 white bishop

Mate in 2 moves

Hrvoje (Vojko) Bartolović (15 June 1932 in Zagreb – 3 November 2005), was a Croatian chess problemist.

Croatian Grandmaster of chess composition Hrvoje Bartolović was considered to be the best Croatian chess problemist, with the possible exception of Nenad Petrović. Since 1948, he has published more than 800 problems (81 included in FIDE Album). Over 180 of them were awarded with prize (80 with the 1st prize), some 120 with honourable mentions and 120 with commendations. He became international judge of FIDE for chess composition in 1956 and the Grandmaster of chess composition in 1980. In 1965, he was the world champion in composing twomovers.

Solution of twomover

Set-play: 1. ... Bf5 2. Qf4#, 1. ... Rf5 2. Qg4#
Try: 1. Qd5? ~ 2.Bxf6#, 1. ... Bf5 2. Qxd2#, 1. ... Rf5 2.Qg2#, but 1. ... Bxb4!
Solution: 1. Qc5! ~ 2. Bxf6#, 1. ... Bf5 2. Qe3#, 1. ... Rf5 2. Qg1#
Themes: Zagoruiko (changed mates 3x2) on Grimshaw interference
