= Charles Masson Fox =

British chess player (1866–1935)

Charles Masson Fox (9 November 1866 – 11 October 1935) was a Cornish businessman who achieved international prominence in the world of chess problems and a place in the homosexual history of Edwardian England.

Masson Fox was born into a Quaker family (although he was not related to the Quakers' founder George Fox) and was second cousin once removed of the fraudulent sinologist Sir Edmund Backhouse, 2nd Baronet. Living throughout his life in the Cornish seaside town of Falmouth, Fox in the early decades of his life was a senior partner of his family's timber firm, Fox Stanton & Company, and was also on the Board of Messrs G C Fox & Company, a long-established firm of shipping agents.

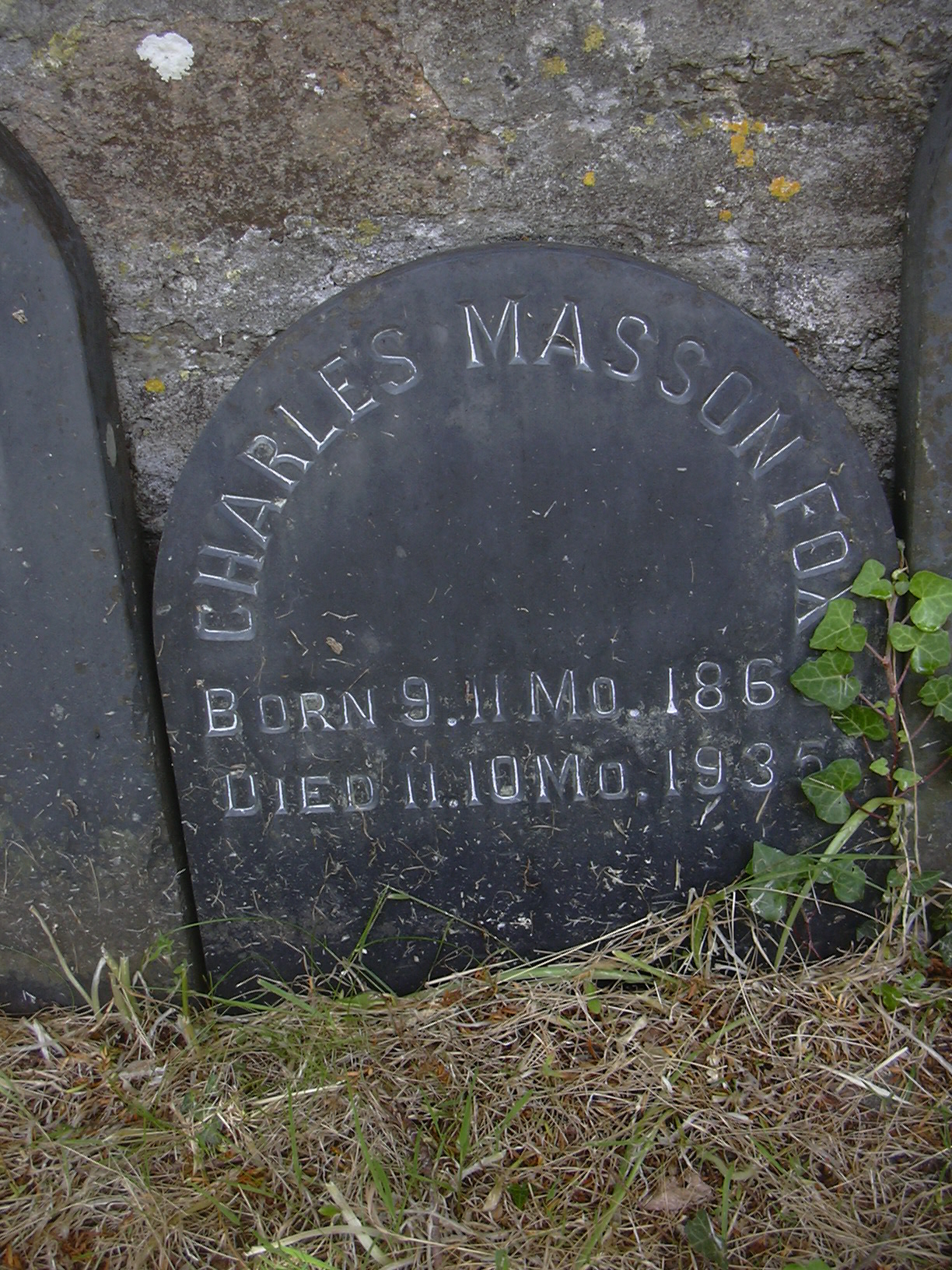
C.M.Fox's gravestone at Budock Water Quaker Burial Ground in Cornwall

Fox is described by chess historian Thomas Rayner Dawson (1889–1951) as "a friendly man, kind, mellow, lovable, bringing peace and comfort and serene joy with him". He was also a discreet but active homosexual. In 1909 he visited Venice with his friend James Cockerton, meeting the writer Frederick Rolfe and becoming the reluctant recipient of Rolfe's famous Venice Letters, in which the gay subculture of Venice is vividly described.

In 1912–13 Fox was blackmailed by a woman who accused him of seducing her 16-year-old son. Eventually Fox reported the matter to the police and the woman was sent to prison for five years and her son for one year, with hard labour. However, Fox was profoundly affected by the publicity surrounding the case, which was reported in detail in the local press. The predictable result of his courageous action was the destruction of his reputation, and the compromise of his business and social life in Falmouth.

Although he continued to live in Cornwall, the focus of his social life shifted to London, and in the last two decades of his life, Fox became prominent in the world of chess. He was elected President of the Cornwall Chess Association, played a prominent part in the development of the British Chess Problem Society, and is still renowned as one of the greatest ever exponents of fairy chess (chess problems with variations in the rules).

== Problem ==
Onitiu, Petrović, Dawson & Fox
1st Pr. Kniest TT. 1930, FIDE Album 1914-1944/III

Position: a8 black upside-down queen, f7 black upside-down queen, a2 black pawn, h2 black upside-down queen, a1 black king, c1 white king, h1 white upside-down queen

Mate in 8 (with grasshoppers Ga8, f7, h2 and h1)

Solution of problem is: 1.Gh3 Gh4 2.Gh5 Gh6 3.Gh7 Gh8 4.Ge7 Gd7 5.Gc7 Gb7 6.Ga7+ Ga6 7.Ga5+ Ga4 8.Ga3#
