= Valerian Onițiu =

Romanian chess player

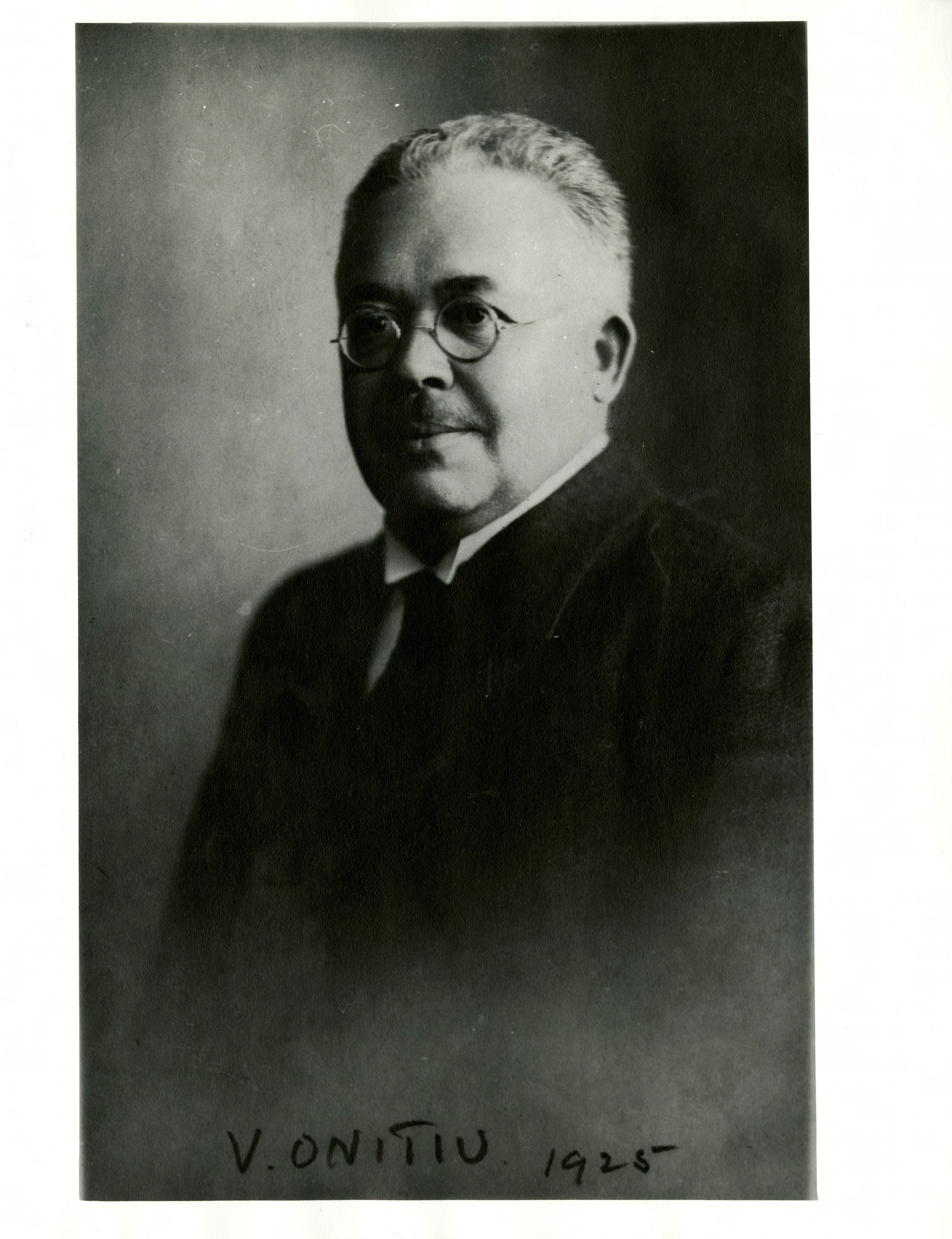
Valerian Onițiu

Oniţiu, Petrović, Dawson & Fox
1st Pr. Kniest TT. 1930
FIDE Album 1914-1944/III

Position: a8 black upside-down queen, f7 black upside-down queen, a2 black pawn, h2 black upside-down queen, a1 black king, c1 white king, h1 white upside-down queen

Mate in 8 (with grasshoppers Ga8, f7, h2 and h1)

Valerian Oniţiu (also Valeriu Oniţiu) (April 8, 1872, Sibiu, Romania – 31 December 1948, Timișoara) was a Romanian chess problemist.

Oniţiu composed all types of problems particularly fairy chess problems. Oniţiu has ten chess problems in FIDE Albums.

Onitiu also did significant work on knight's tours. First in Problemist Fairy Chess Supplement (vol.1 no.12 Jun 1932 p. 74) problems 452-455 he gives tours with ten three-unit lines. The editor T. R. Dawson states: "V. Onitiu writes to me that he has examined all possible cases, some 1330 in all, and is convinced that only six of them admit tours, namely Dr Hogrefe's, mine, and the following four new ones. Second in Fairy Chess Review (vol.4 no.3 Dec 1939 p.43 problem 4135, with solution in no.6 Jun 1940 p.93.) he gives a symmetric tour with squares in a knight chain. The editor states: "VO notes that he examined 144 dispositions of the squares, all that are possible for diametral symmetry, and this is the only case leading to a tour. Moreover every move of the tour is determined, so that the tour is UNIQUE in all the millions possible."

== Problem ==
The solution of this problem is: 1.Gh3 Gh4 2.Gh5 Gh6 3.Gh7 Gh8 4.Ge7 Gd7 5.Gc7 Gb7 6.Ga7+ Ga6 7.Ga5+ Ga4 8.Ga3#

This problem is a case of incidence of thematic tourney prescript problems with grasshoppers without limiting the number of the moves. Identical problems were sent independently by four composers at about the same time.
