= Monochromatic chess =

Chess variant

Chess puzzle by Raymond Smullyan

Position: e8 black king, b4 white king, g3 unknown color pawn, d2 white pawn, f2 white pawn

What color is pawn g3?

Monochromatic chess is a chess variant with unknown origin. The initial board position and all rules are the same as in regular chess, except that pieces that begin on a black square must always stay on a black square and pieces that begin on a white square must always stay on a white square. This would mean that knights can never move, but The Classified Encyclopedia of Chess Variants says that knights make a double jump. It has been suggested that a knight be replaced with a (3,1)-leaper (camel).

If knights are allowed to move (or are captured, clearing the way), castling may become possible, but only on the kingside. Under the rules, pawns can only move by capturing (possibly en passant) or by advancing two squares for their first move.

A stalemate occurs if a player's king is not in check but the player nevertheless has no legal moves under the rules of the game. Similarly, a checkmate occurs if the king is placed in check and the king has no legal moves under the rules of the game. This means that certain board positions in regular chess which would not result in the end of the game can be checkmates or stalemates in monochromatic chess. For example, each player has one bishop for which it is possible to obtain checkmate with just this bishop and a king, while it is impossible with the other bishop along with the king, since only one bishop is capable of threatening the king of the opposing side. Because the two kings must occupy squares of different colours, they are allowed to be located next to each other.

This variant is used mostly in chess problems. Smullyan's example asks: What color is pawn g3 – white or black? Answer is black – with white pawns on d2 and f2, the white king can move from e1 only with castling kingside and then g1–h2–g3–... so the pawn on g3 cannot be white.

== Bichromatic chess ==
In Bichromatic chess, the opposite restrictions apply. A piece on a white square must move to a black square and vice versa. Hence pawns cannot capture (or advance two squares) and bishops cannot move. Also, castling is impossible, and queens behave like rooks.
