= Double check =

Chess term; a check delivered by two pieces simultaneously

Position: g7 black king, e5 black pawn, f5 black pawn, d4 black queen, g3 white bishop, a2 black pawn, f1 white king, g1 white rook

From this position, 1.Bxe5++ is a winning double check.

In chess and other related games, a double check is a check delivered by two pieces simultaneously. In chess notation, it is almost always represented the same way as a single check ("+"), but is sometimes symbolized by "++". (The symbol "++", however, is also sometimes used to denote checkmate.) This article uses "++" for double check and "#" for checkmate.

== Chess ==
Gundersen vs. Faul, 1928

Position: a8 black rook, c8 black bishop, d8 black queen, f8 black rook, a7 black pawn, b7 black pawn, e7 black knight, e6 white knight, h6 black king, d5 black pawn, e5 white pawn, f5 black pawn, g5 black pawn, h5 white pawn, b4 black bishop, d4 black knight, g4 white queen, c3 white knight, a2 white pawn, b2 white pawn, f2 white pawn, g2 white pawn, a1 white rook, c1 white bishop, e1 white king, h1 white rook

After 14...g7–g5, White mates with a double check by capturing the pawn en passant.

The most common form of double check involves one piece moving to deliver check and revealing a discovered check at the same time from a piece it had been blocking. The only possible reply to a double check is a king move, as it is impossible to block or capture both checking pieces at once.

In exceptional circumstances, it is possible for the moved piece in a double check to not give check. The only way for this to happen in orthodox chess is by way of an en passant capture. In the position shown from Gundersen–Faul, 1928, Black has just played 14...g7–g5. White replies 15.hxg6 e.p.#. The result is a double check even though the white pawn does not give check: one check is given by the rook, discovered by the capturing pawn's move; the other by the bishop, revealed by the captured pawn's removal. Such a double check is extremely rare in practical play, but it is sometimes found in chess problems.

=== Game examples ===
A double check is a part of the smothered mate pattern known as Philidor's legacy.

Réti vs. Tartakower, 1910

Position: a8 black rook, b8 black knight, c8 black bishop, e8 black king, f8 black bishop, h8 black rook, a7 black pawn, b7 black pawn, f7 black pawn, g7 black pawn, h7 black pawn, c6 black pawn, e5 black queen, e4 black knight, d3 white queen, a2 white pawn, b2 white pawn, c2 white pawn, d2 white bishop, f2 white pawn, g2 white pawn, h2 white pawn, c1 white king, d1 white rook, f1 white bishop, g1 white knight, h1 white rook

Position after 8...Nxe4??

Aron Nimzowitsch wrote, "Even the laziest king flees wildly in the face of a double check." Because the only possible response to a double check is a king move, the double check is often an important tactical motif. A famous example is Réti–Tartakower, Vienna 1910, which arose after:

1. e4 c6 2. d4 d5 3. Nc3 dxe4 4. Nxe4 Nf6 5. Qd3 e5?! 6. dxe5 Qa5+ 7. Bd2 Qxe5 8. 0-0-0! Nxe4?? (diagram) 9. Qd8+!!

Réti sacrifices a queen in order to set up a double check, as well as an unstoppable checkmate in two moves.

9... Kxd8 10. Bg5++

White mates after 10...Ke8 11.Rd8# or 10...Kc7 11.Bd8#.

Anderssen vs. Dufresne, 1852

Position: b8 black rook, e8 black king, g8 black rook, a7 black pawn, b7 black bishop, c7 black pawn, d7 black pawn, e7 black knight, f7 black pawn, h7 black pawn, b6 black bishop, c6 black knight, f6 white pawn, a4 white queen, a3 white bishop, c3 white pawn, d3 white bishop, f3 black queen, a2 white pawn, f2 white pawn, g2 white pawn, h2 white pawn, d1 white rook, e1 white rook, g1 white king

Position after 19...Qxf3?

A double check was also seen in the celebrated Evergreen Game, Anderssen–Dufresne, 1852. Anderssen won with:

20. Rxe7+! Nxe7 21.Qxd7+!!

A queen sacrifice to set up a deadly double check.

21... Kxd7 22. Bf5++ Ke8

Or 22...Kc6 23.Bd7#.

23. Bd7+ Kf8 24. Bxe7#

=== Variants ===
Position: d7 black pawn, a6 white upside-down queen, e6 black king, e5 white pawn, c4 white bishop, d4 white upside-down knight, f4 white upside-down knight, e1 white rook, h1 white king

Winning position for White shown with a pawn, a bishop, a rook, two moas (shown as inverted knights) and a grasshopper (shown as inverted queen). After Black moves his only pawn to d5, White taking it en passant with their own pawn results in quintuple check.

Position: e7 black pawn, f7 black king, f5 white pawn, d3 white upside-down knight, f1 white rook, g1 white king

Winning position for White shown with a pawn, rook, and a knight-rider (shown as inverted knight). After Black moves his only pawn to e5, White taking it en passant with their own pawn results in triple check.

In chess with variant rules or fairy pieces, other ways of delivering a double check may be possible. The moves of ordinary chess pieces only permit a maximum of two pieces giving check at once, but in some variants, triple checks and higher may be possible.

For example, in the winning position shown to the left, after Black plays 1...d5 to remove the check from the bishop on c4, White plays 2.exd6 e.p.+++++. After the en passant capture, five pieces discover-check the black king: both moas (the moa is a non-leaping knight which first takes a diagonal step, then an orthogonal one), the rook, the grasshopper (the grasshopper captures by leaping over an intervening piece) and the bishop. Black would now be obliged to escape the multi-check and play one of either 2...Kxd6, to recapture White's pawn right away, or passively evade the checks without capturing by playing 2...Kd7 or 2...Kf6.

Another example is shown with the winning position shown on the right, after Black plays 1...e5 to remove the check from the knight-rider on d3, White plays 2. fxe6 e.p.+++. After the en passant capture, three pieces discover-check the black king: the pawn, the knight-rider, and the rook. Black would now be obliged to escape the multi-check by recapturing White's pawn with 2...Kxe6 or passively evading the checks without capturing by playing one of either 2...Ke7, 2...Ke8, 2...Kg6, 2...Kg7, or 2...Kg8.

== Xiangqi ==
In xiangqi, the Chinese version of chess, triple check and even quadruple check are possible, as in the following examples. In janggi (Korean chess), even quintuple and sextuple check are possible as well.

Triple check: Red moved his horse from e5 to d7, giving check and exposing a double check from the chariot and cannon.	Quadruple check: Red moved his chariot from f9 to e9, uncovering two checks from the horses, giving a check of its own, and making a platform for the cannon at e7 to give yet another check. In janggi, using the same pieces and adding two elephants that both attack the general through the chariot's square allows a sextuple check.
