= Knight (chess) =

Chess piece

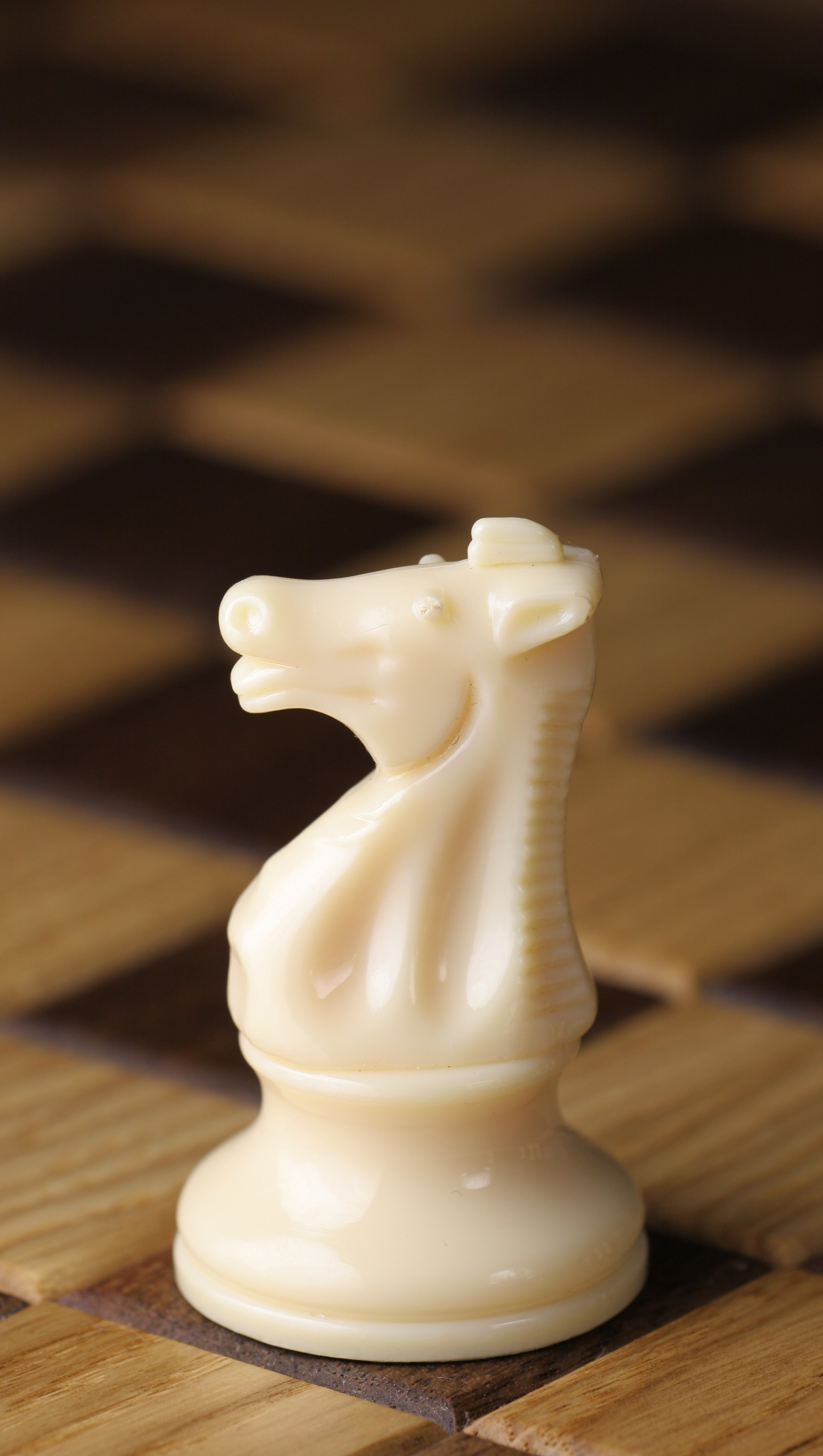
White knight

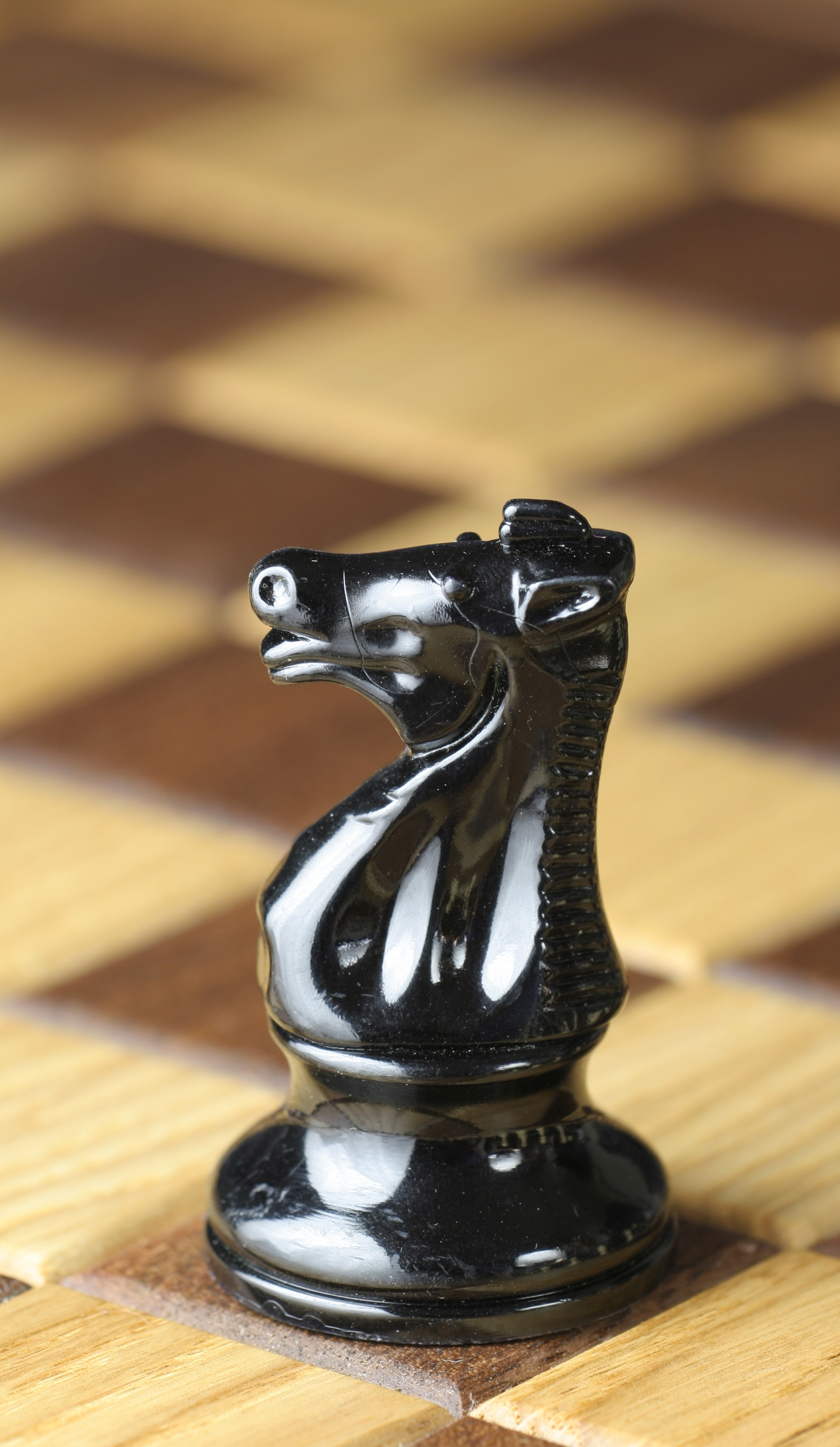
Black knight

The knight (♘, ♞) is a piece in the game of chess. It moves two squares vertically and one square horizontally, or two squares horizontally and one square vertically, jumping over other pieces. Each player starts the game with two knights on the b- and g-files, each located between a rook and a bishop.

== Movement ==
Compared to other chess pieces, the knight's movement is unique: it moves two squares vertically and one square horizontally, or two squares horizontally and one square vertically (with both forming the shape of a capital L). Consequently, a knight alternates between light and dark squares with each move. When moving, the knight can jump over pieces to reach its destination. (Note: Because of this, the move can also be described in other ways, such as one square diagonally and one square orthogonally "outward" (not ending adjacent to its starting square), or one square orthogonally followed by one square diagonally outward. The latter describes the move of the horse in xiangqi, which cannot jump.) (Note: The FIDE Laws of Chess use a different but equivalent definition: "The knight may move to one of the squares nearest to that on which it stands but not on the same rank, file or diagonal.") Knights capture in the same way, replacing the enemy piece on the square and removing it from the board. A knight can have up to eight available moves at once. Knights and pawns are the only pieces that can be moved in the chess starting position.

Position: a8 black rook, b8 black knight, c8 black bishop, d8 black queen, e8 black king, f8 black bishop, g8 black knight, h8 black rook, a7 black pawn, b7 black pawn, c7 black pawn, d7 black pawn, e7 black pawn, f7 black pawn, g7 black pawn, h7 black pawn, a6 black circle, c6 black circle, f6 black circle, h6 black circle, a3 white circle, c3 white circle, f3 white circle, h3 white circle, a2 white pawn, b2 white pawn, c2 white pawn, d2 white pawn, e2 white pawn, f2 white pawn, g2 white pawn, h2 white pawn, a1 white rook, b1 white knight, c1 white bishop, d1 white queen, e1 white king, f1 white bishop, g1 white knight, h1 white rook

The starting position in chess, with dots representing possible knight moves

Position: b8 black knight, d7 black circle, a6 black circle, c6 black circle, e5 white circle, g5 white circle, d4 white circle, h4 white circle, f3 white knight, d2 white circle, h2 white circle, e1 white circle, g1 white circle

Knights on different squares, with dots representing possible knight moves

Position: d5 three, e5 white circle, f5 one, g5 white circle, h5 three, d4 white circle, e4 one, f4 two, g4 one, h4 white circle, d3 one, e3 two, f3 white knight, g3 two, h3 one, d2 white circle, e2 one, f2 two, g2 one, h2 white circle, d1 three, e1 white circle, f1 one, g1 white circle, h1 three

Numbers representing the minimum possible moves to attack a square

== Value ==
Knights and bishops, also known as minor pieces, have a value of three pawns. Bishops utilize a longer range, but they can move only to squares of one color. Knights, unlike bishops, are not restricted to a single color complex; a knight on a light square can only move to dark squares and vice versa. This allows knights to be highly dynamic attackers, but it also makes them generally more susceptible to being trapped or kicked by pawns than bishops. Knights and bishops are stronger when supported by other pieces (such as pawns) to create outposts and become more powerful when they advance, as long as they remain active. Generally, knights are strongest in the center of the board, where they have up to eight moves; suboptimal on the edge of the board, where they have four; and weakest in corners, where they have only two. Knights are especially effective at forking enemy pieces, as their unique movement allows them to threaten multiple squares without being directly attacked by pieces on those squares (barring other knights). Generally speaking, bishops are considered by most high-level players and chess engines to be slightly more valuable than knights, as a bishop can control up to 13 squares while a knight can control up to 8; however, in practice, the relative value of a bishop or knight is highly dependent on the pawn structure and specific positional features. The knight's value is higher in closed positions since it can jump over blockades; in contrast, bishops are generally more valuable than knights in open positions as their longer range allows them to control more squares when unfettered by pawns.

Position: f8 black bishop, e7 black circle, g7 black circle, d6 black circle, h6 black circle, c5 black circle, b4 black circle, a3 black circle, f3 white circle, h3 white circle, e2 white circle, g1 white knight

A knight and bishop, with dots representing their possible moves. A knight can move to white and black squares, but a bishop is restricted to its initial square color.

== Properties ==
Position: a8 black rook, d8 black rook, g8 black king, a7 black pawn, b7 black pawn, f7 black pawn, g7 black bishop, h7 black pawn, d6 black pawn, g6 black pawn, d5 white knight, e5 black pawn, e4 white pawn, h4 black queen, a3 white pawn, f3 white pawn, b2 white pawn, d2 white queen, g2 white pawn, h2 white pawn, b1 white king, d1 white rook, h1 white rook

A knight occupying a hole (d5) in the enemy pawn structure

Enemy pawns are effective at harassing knights because a pawn attacking a knight is not itself attacked by the knight and, because a pawn is worth less than a knight, it does not matter if the knight is defended. For this reason, a knight is effective when placed in a weakness in the opponent's pawn structure, i.e. a square that cannot be attacked by enemy pawns. In the diagram, White's knight on d5 is very powerful – more powerful than Black's bishop on g7.

Whereas two bishops cover each other's weaknesses, two knights tend not to cooperate with each other as efficiently. As such, a pair of bishops is usually considered better than a pair of knights. World Champion José Raúl Capablanca considered that a queen and a knight is usually a better combination than a queen and a bishop. However, Glenn Flear found no game of Capablanca's that supported his statement; statistics do not support the statement, either. In an endgame without other pieces or pawns, two knights generally have a better chance of forming a drawing fortress against a queen than do two bishops or a bishop and a knight.

Salvio (in 1604)

Position: a8 white king, a7 white pawn, c7 black king, g1 white knight

White to move cannot win. White wins if Black is to move.

Compared to a bishop, a knight is often not as good in an endgame. A knight can exert control over only one part of the board at a time and often takes multiple moves to reposition to a new location, which often makes it less suitable in endgames with pawns on both sides of the board. This limitation is less important, however, in endgames with pawns on only one side of the board. Knights are superior to bishops in an endgame if all the pawns are on one side of the board. Furthermore, knights have the advantage of being able to control squares of either color, unlike a lone bishop. Nonetheless, a disadvantage of the knight (compared to the other pieces) is that by itself it cannot lose a move to put the opponent in zugzwang (see triangulation and tempo), while a bishop can. In the study by Salvio, if the knight is on a black square and it is White's turn to move, White cannot win. Similarly, if the knight were on a white square and it were Black's turn to move, White cannot win. In the other two cases, White would win. If instead of the knight, White had a bishop on either color of square, White would win with either side to move.

Position: c4 white bishop, g2 white king, c1 black knight, h1 black knight

Knight trapped by an enemy bishop; knight trapped by a king

In an endgame where one side has only a king and a knight while the other side has only a king, the game is a draw since a checkmate is impossible. When a lone king faces a king and two knights, a checkmate can never be forced; checkmate can occur only if the opponent commits a blunder by moving their king to a square where it can be checkmated on the next move. Checkmate can be forced with a bishop and knight, however, or with two bishops, even though the bishop and knight are in general about equal in value. Paradoxically, checkmate with two knights sometimes can be forced if the weaker side has a single extra pawn, but this is a curiosity of little practical value (see two knights endgame). Pawnless endgames are a rarity, and if the stronger side has even a single pawn, an extra knight should give them an easy win. A bishop can trap (although it cannot then capture) a knight on the rim (see diagram), especially in the endgame.

=== Stamma's mate ===
In a few rare endgame positions where the opposing king is trapped in a corner in front of its own pawn, it is possible to force mate with only a king and knight in a pattern known as Stamma's mate, which has occasionally been seen in practice. In the position below, from Nogueiras–Gongora, Cuban championship 2001, Black played 75...Nxf6??, incorrectly assuming that the ending would be drawn following the capture of the last white pawn on a2. (Correct was 75...Ne3! 76.Kg6 Ng4 77.Kg7 and now 77...Nxf6! may be safely played, the king being sufficiently distant). Play continued 76.Nxf6 Ke5 77.Nd7+ Kd4 78.Kf4 Kc3 79.Ke3 Kb2 80.Kd2 Kxa2 81.Kc2 Ka1 82.Nc5 Ka2 83.Nd3 Ka1 84.Nc1 and Black resigned, as 84...a2 85.Nb3 is mate.

Position: e6 black king, f6 white pawn, d5 black knight, g5 white king, e4 white knight, a3 black pawn, a2 white pawn

Position after 75.Kg5

Position: a3 black pawn, c2 white king, a1 black king, c1 white knight

Black resigns due to 84...a2 85.Nb3#.

== Notation ==
In algebraic notation, the usual modern way of recording chess games, the letter N stands for the knight (K is reserved for the king). In descriptive chess notation, Kt is sometimes used instead, mainly in older literature. In chess problems and endgame studies, the letter S, standing for Springer, the German name for the piece, is often used. In some variants of fairy chess, N is used for the nightrider, a popular fairy chess piece.

== Dimensions and design ==
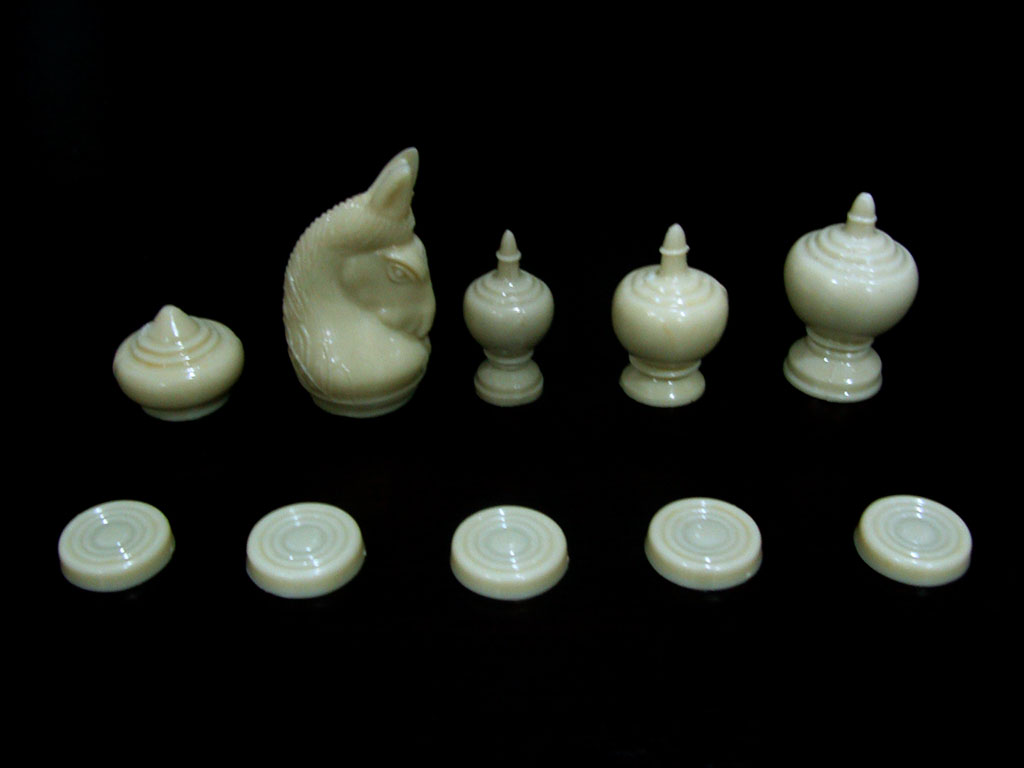
In makruk, chess played in Thailand and Cambodia, the knight is noticeably the largest piece and uniquely hand-carved. High-end sets showcase intricate details including deeply engraved manes, open jaws, teeth, flaring nostrils, and sometimes a crafted "fallen tongue".

The knight is the fourth tallest chess piece and is typically represented by a horse's head and neck. Historically, knights were frequently depicted as a mounted rider on a horse as seen on the Lewis and Charlemagne chessmen.

In many designs such as the Staunton chess set, the horse's head and neck are more sculpted and ornated. The knight also features a distinct collar, which is a flat circular disk separating the carved horse head from the flared columnar base.

For traditional chess set carvers, the knight is widely considered the most difficult piece to make because it requires intricate, realistic hand-carving rather than simple lathe-turning.

== History ==
The knight has the oldest defined movement of any chess piece. (Note: While the king's and rook's basic moves have remained unchanged since the invention of chaturanga, the development of castling occurred long afterwards.) It was first introduced in the Indian game of chaturanga around the 6th century; it has not changed since.

=== Variants ===
Pieces similar to the knight are found in almost all games of the chess family. The ma of xiangqi and janggi is slightly more restricted; conceptually, the piece is considered to pass through the adjacent orthogonal point, which must be unoccupied, rather than "jumping". It is therefore possible to block an attack by a ma by moving a piece adjacent to it. Another related piece is the keima of shogi, which moves like a knight but can move only two squares forward followed by one square sideways, restricting its movement to two possible squares.

=== Names ===
The knight is sometimes colloquially referred to as a "horse", which is also the translation of the piece's name in several languages: Spanish caballo, Italian cavallo, Russian конь, etc. Some languages refer to it as the "jumper", reflecting the knight's ability to move over pieces in its path: Polish skoczek, Danish/Norwegian springer, Swedish springare, German Springer, Luxembourgish Sprénger, Slovene skakač. In Sicilian it is called sceccu, a slang term for a donkey, derived from the Arabic sheikh, who during the Islamic period rode from village to village on donkeys collecting taxes.

Overview of chess piece names
Language	Knight	Translation
Adyghe	Ш шы (shy)	horse
Afrikaans	R Ruiter	rider
Albanian	K Kali	horse
Arabic	ح حصان (ħiṣān)	horse
Azerbaijani	A At	horse
Armenian	Ձ Ձի (Dzi)	horse
Basque	Z Zalduna	knight
Belarusian (Taraškievica)	В вершнік	rider
Bengali	G ঘোড়া (ghoṛā)	Horse
Bulgarian	К кон	horse
Catalan	C cavall	horse
Chinese	N 馬 (mǎ)	horse / 马
Czech	J jezdec	rider
Danish	S springer	jumper
Dutch	P paard	horse
English	N knight	
Esperanto	Ĉ ĉevalo	horse
Estonian	R ratsu	riding horse
Finnish	R ratsu	ride
French	C cavalier / cheval	rider / horse
Galician	C cabalo	horse
Georgian	მ მხედარი (mkhedari)	rider
German	S Springer	jumper
Greek	Ι ίππος (íppos)	horse
Hindi	G घोड़ा (ghoṛā)	horse
Hebrew	פ פרש (Parash)	horseman
Hausa	J jarumi	mounted warrior
Hungarian	H huszár / ló	hussar / horse
Icelandic	R riddari	knight
Ido	K kavalo	horse
Indonesian	K kuda	horse
Interslavic	J jezdec / konj	rider / horse
Irish	D ridire	knight
Italian	C cavallo	horse
Japanese	N ナイト (naito) / 桂 八方桂 (happōkei)	
Javanese	K jaran	horse
Kannada	ಕು ಕುದುರೆ (kudure)	horse
Kabardian	Ш шы (shy)	horse
Kazakh	А ат (at)	horse
Korean	N 나이트 (na i teu)	
Latin	E eques	knight
Latvian	Z zirgs	horse
Lithuanian	Ž žirgas	horse
Luxembourgish	S Sprénger	jumper
Macedonian	S коњ / скокач	horse / jumper
Malayalam	N/Kt കുതിര (kuthira)	horse
Marathi	G घोडा (ghoḍā)	horse
Mongolian	М морь (mor)	horse
Norwegian Bokmål	S springer	jumper
Norwegian Nynorsk	S springar	jumper
Odia	N ଘୋଡ଼ା (ghoṛa)	horse
Oromo
Persian	ا اسب	horse
Polish	S skoczek / koń	jumper / horse
Portuguese	C cavalo	horse
Romanian	C cal	horse
Russian	К конь (kon')	horse
Scottish Gaelic	D ridir	knight
Serbo-Croatian	S skakač / konj (С скaкaч / коњ)	jumper / horse
Northern Sotho	M Mogale	
Sicilian	S scecc[h]u	donkey
Slovak	J jazdec	rider
Slovene	S skakač	jumper
Spanish	C caballo	horse
Swedish	H springare / riddare	horse/knight
Tamil	N/Kt குதிரை (kutirai)	horse
Telugu	గుర్రం (gurraṃ)	horse
Thai	ม ม้า (ma)	horse
Turkish	A at	horse
Ukrainian	K кінь (kin)	horse
Urdu	گھوڑا (ghōṛā)	
Uzbek	O ot	horse
Vietnamese	M mã / ngựa	horse
Welsh	M marchog	rider

== In mathematics ==
The knight is relevant in some mathematical problems. For example, the knight's tour problem is the problem of finding a series of moves by a knight on a chessboard in which every square is visited exactly once.

== Knight variations ==
Even among sets of the standard Staunton pattern, the style of the pieces varies. The knights vary considerably. Here are some examples.

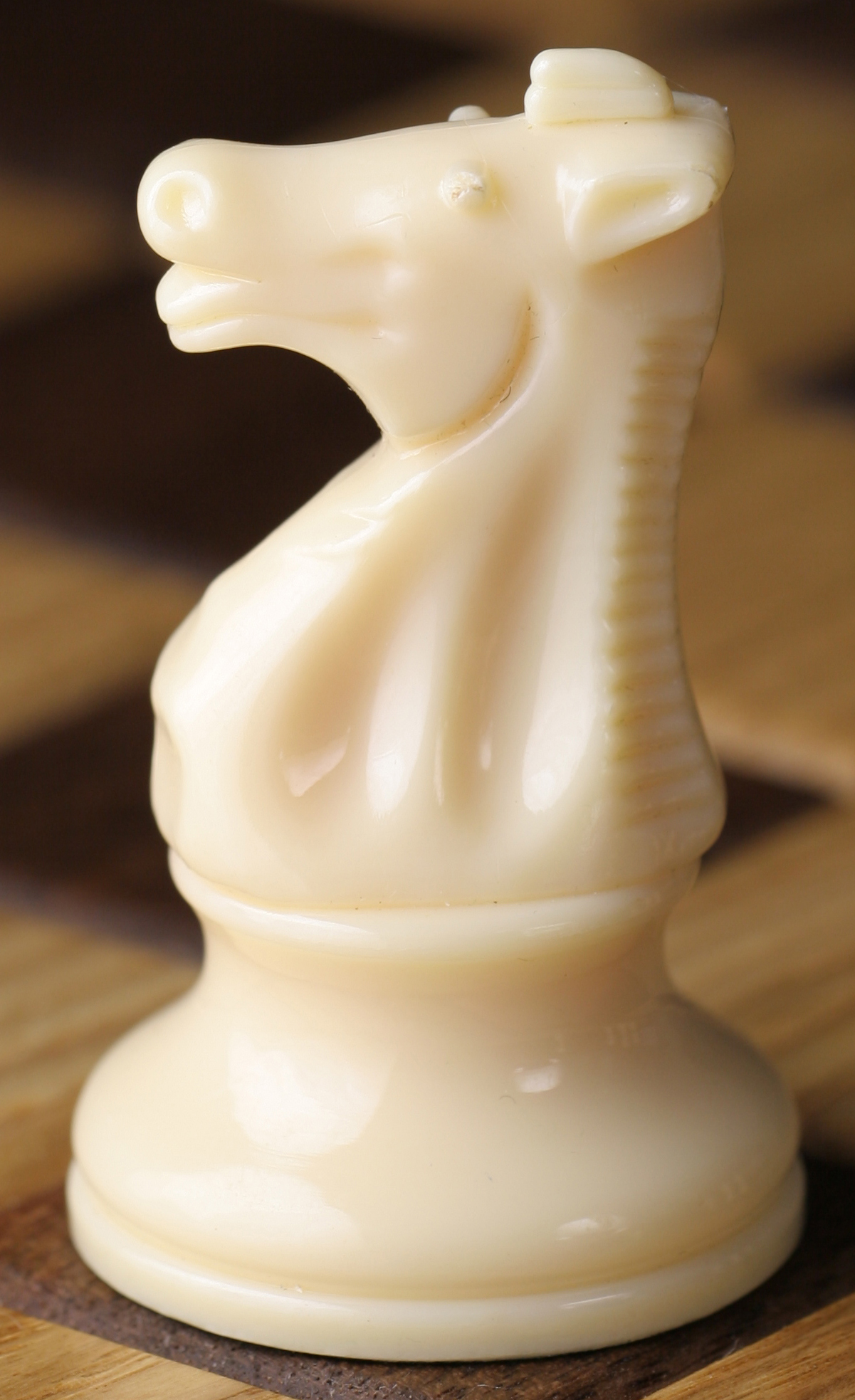

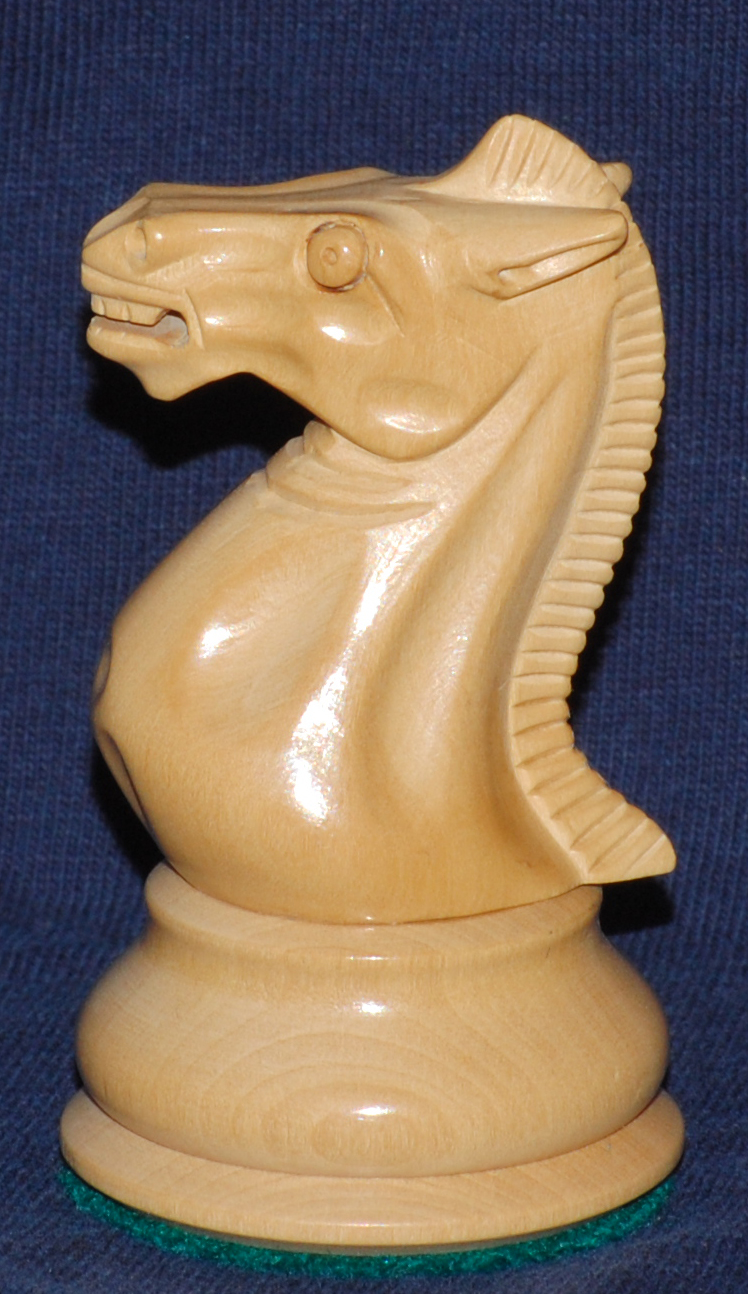

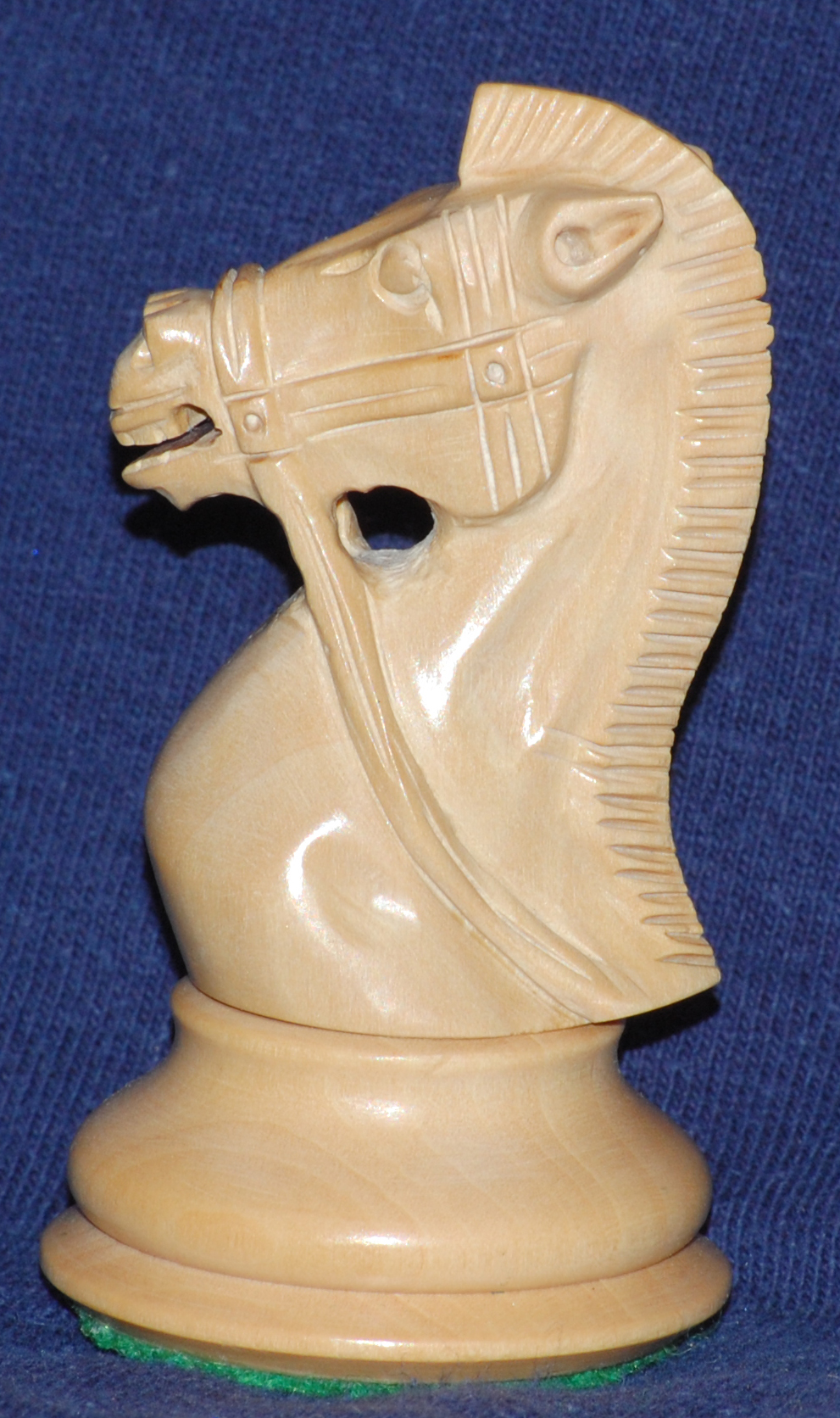

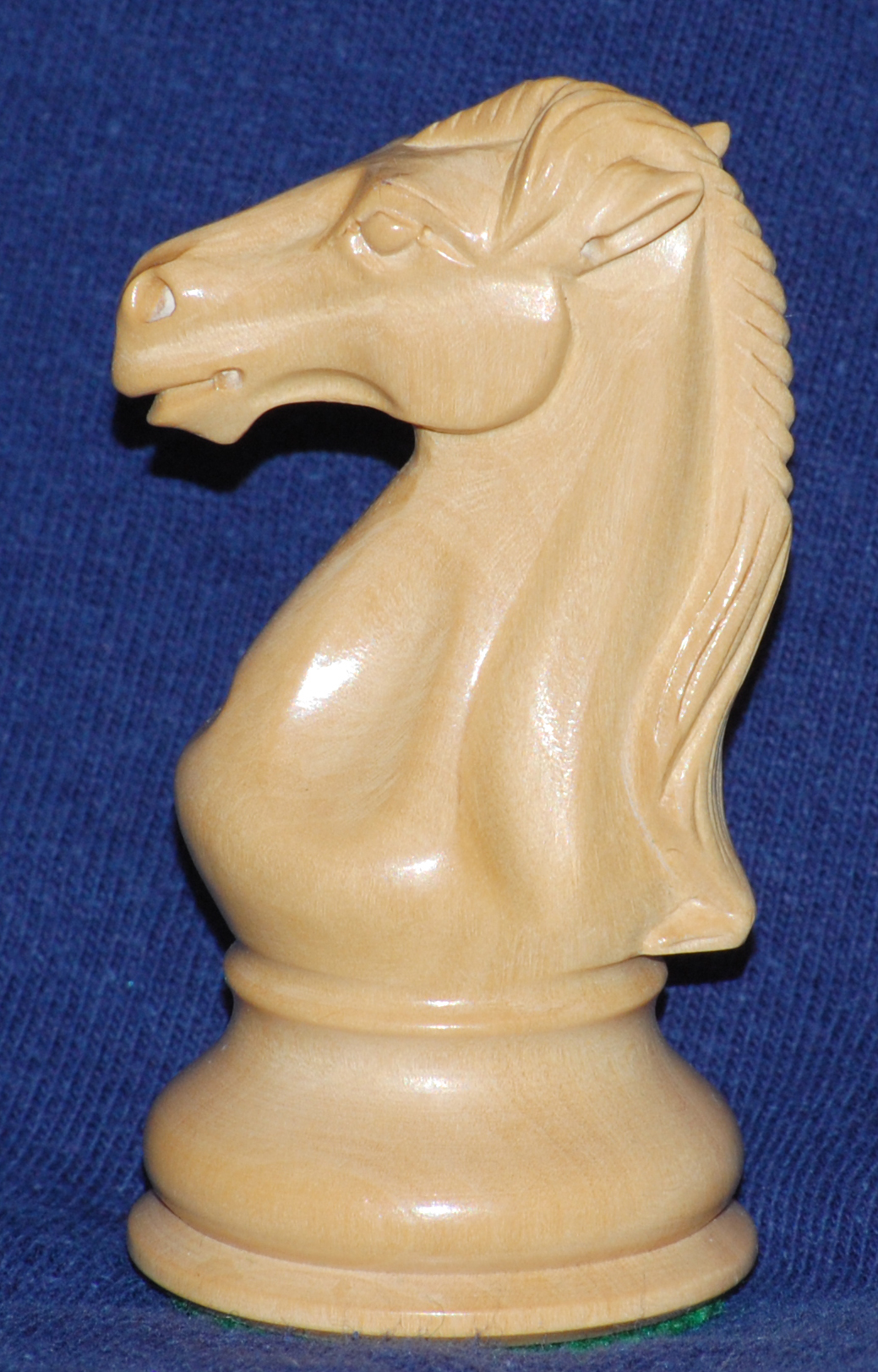

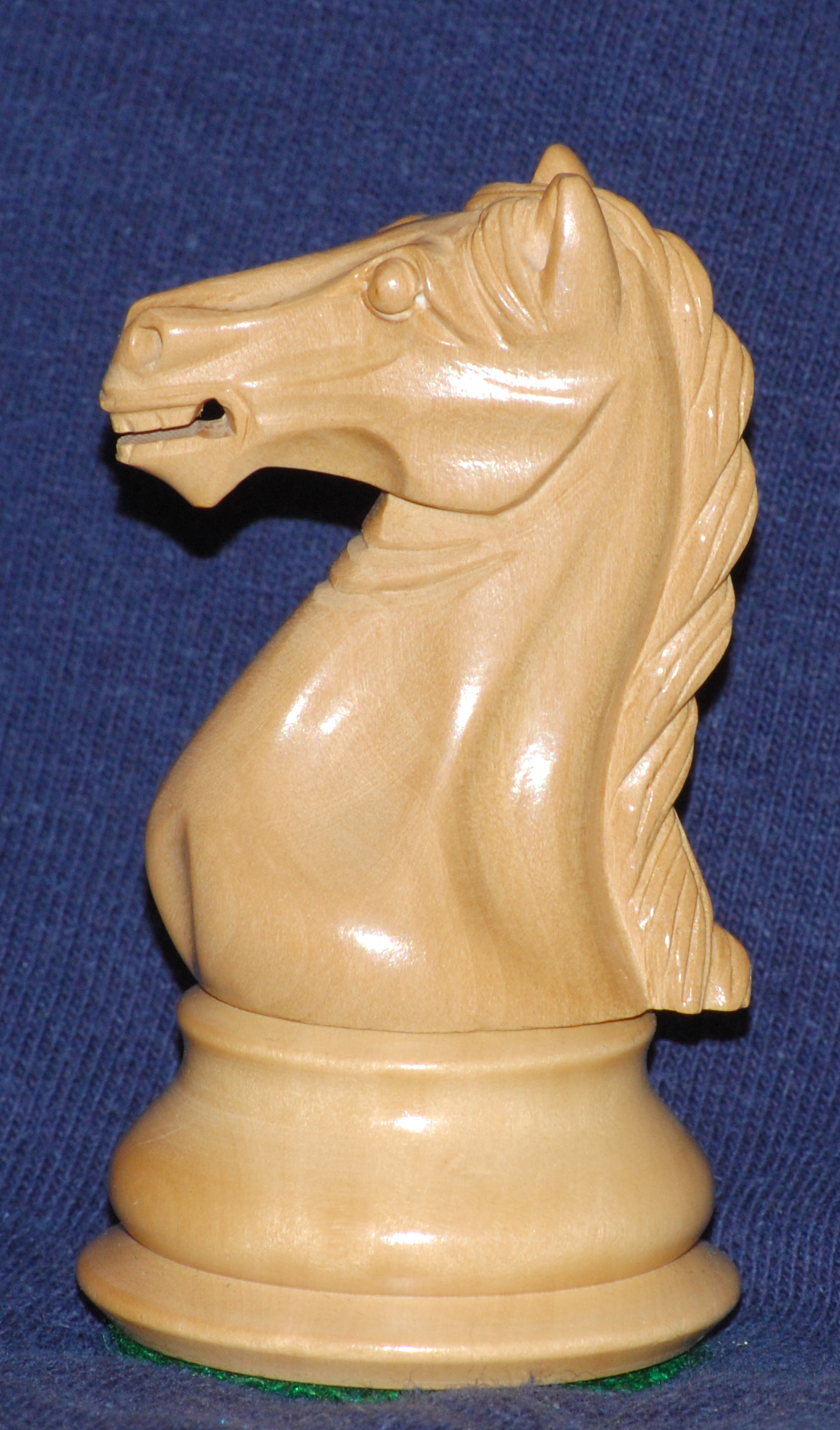

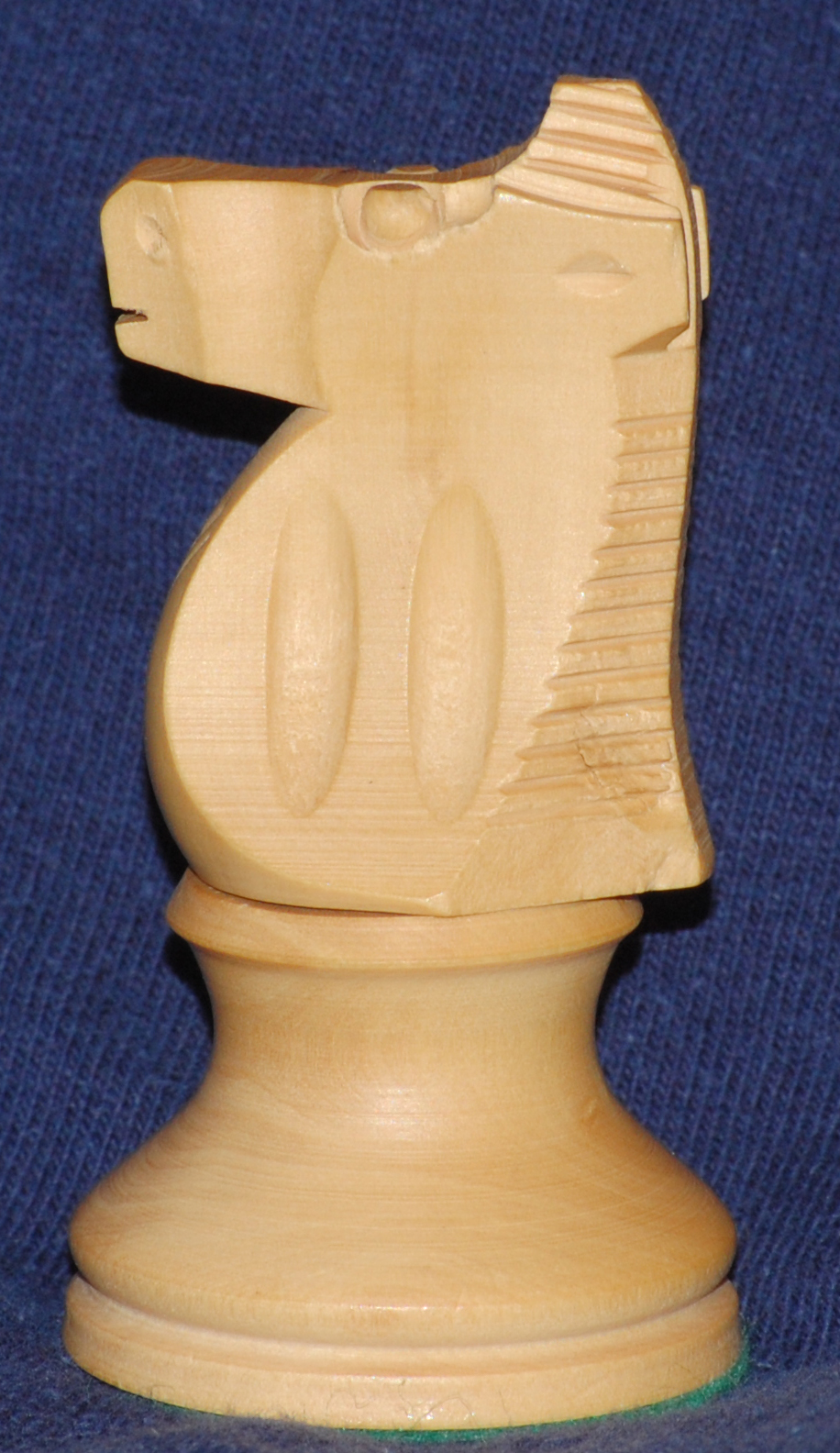

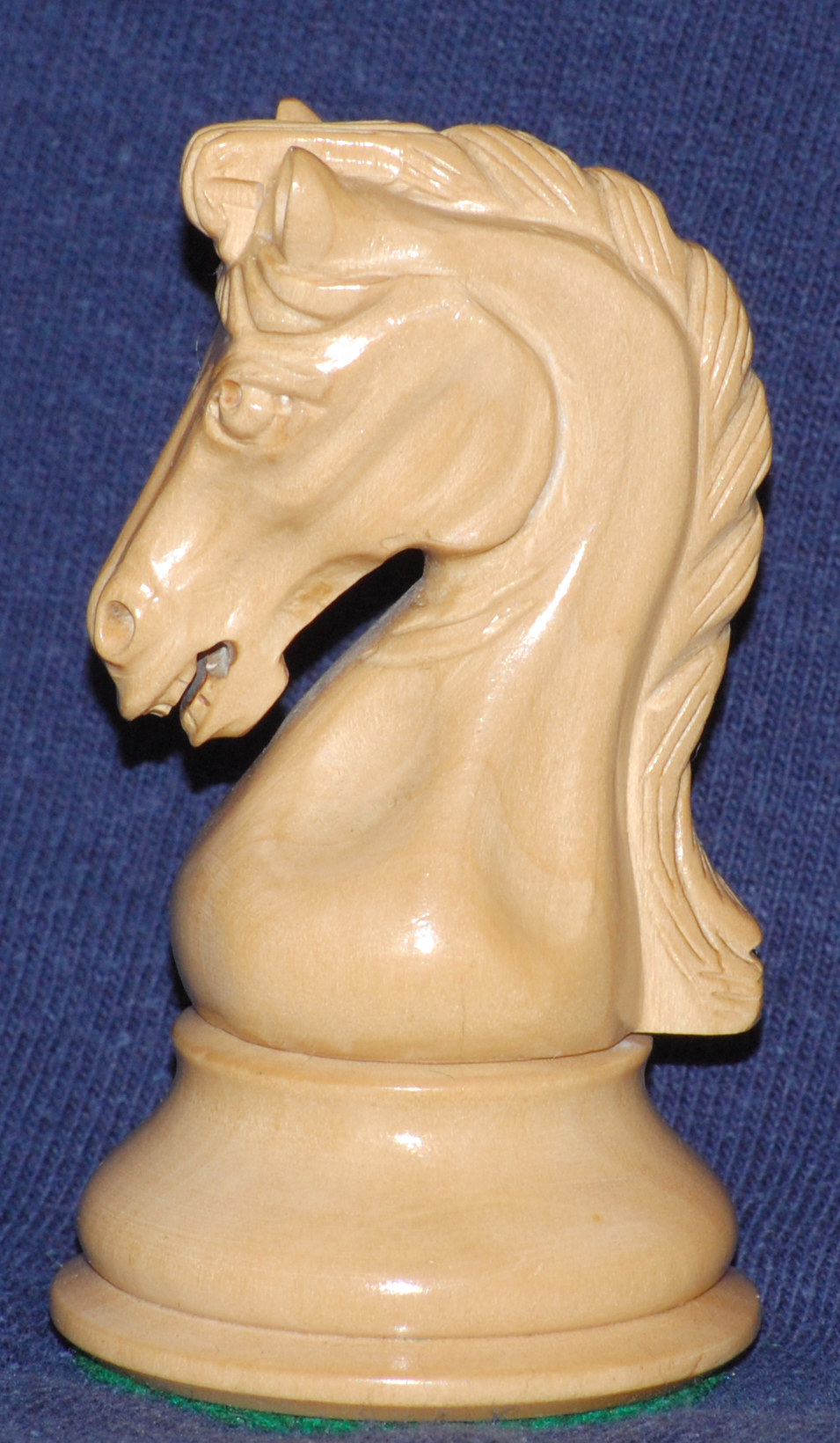

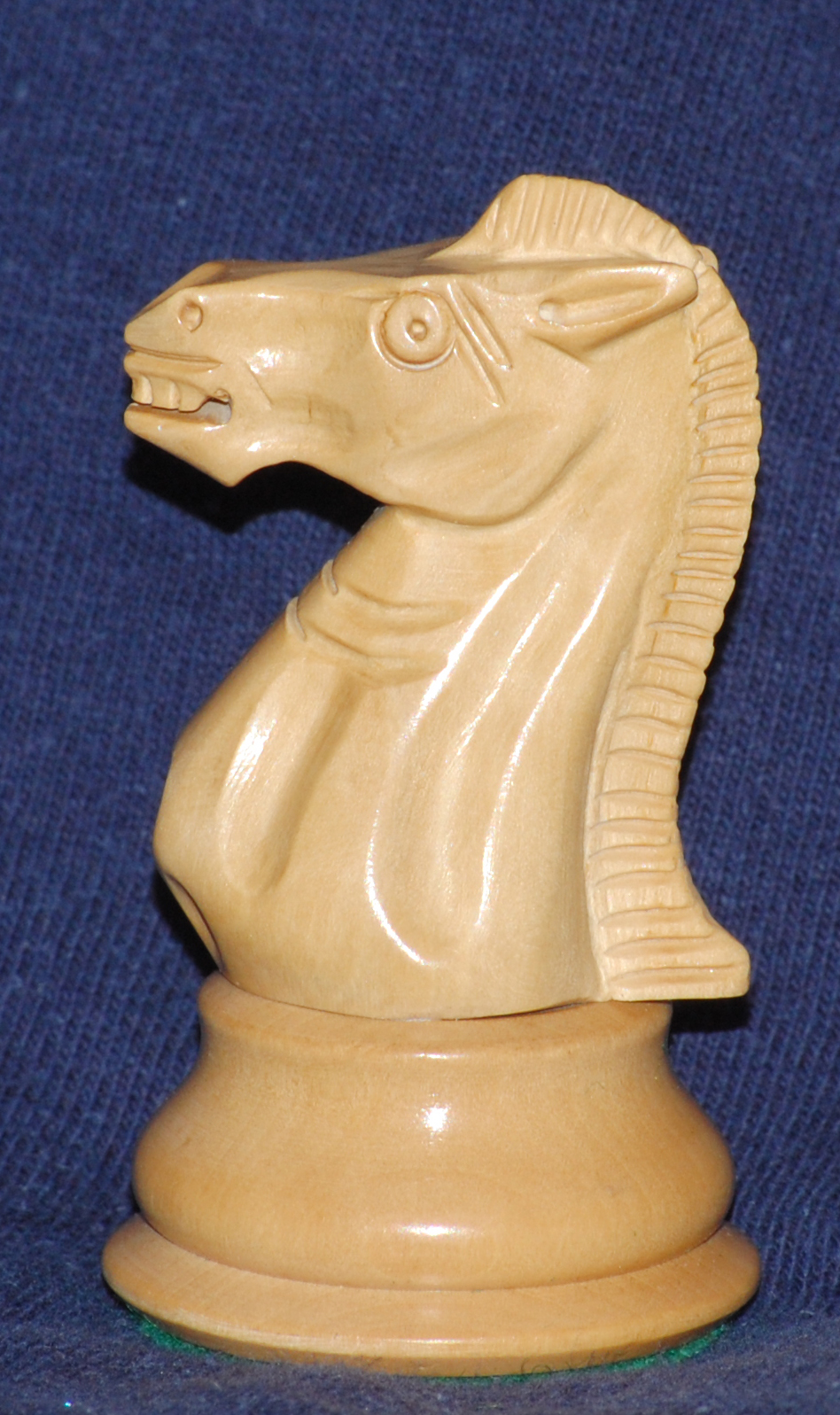

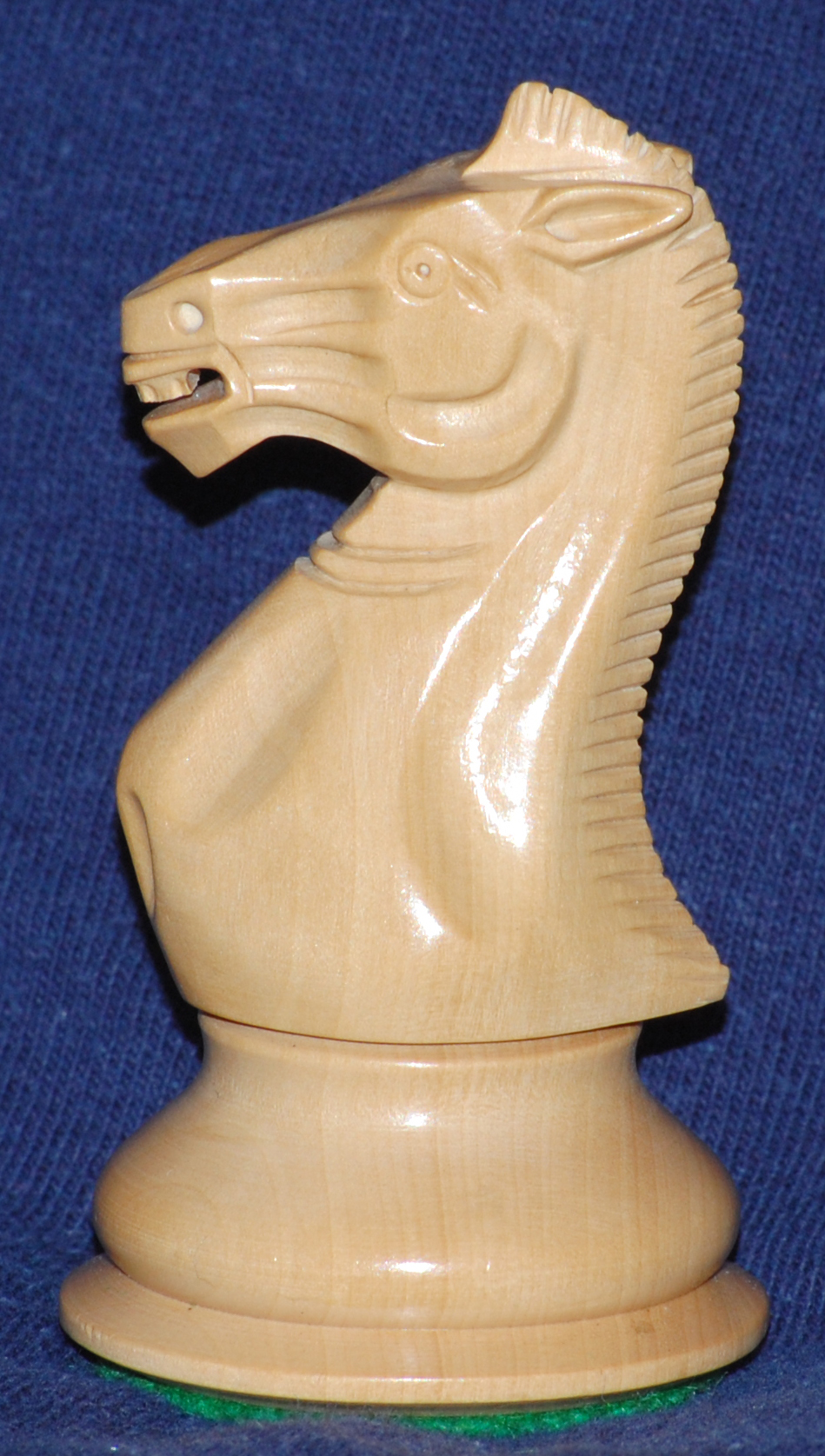

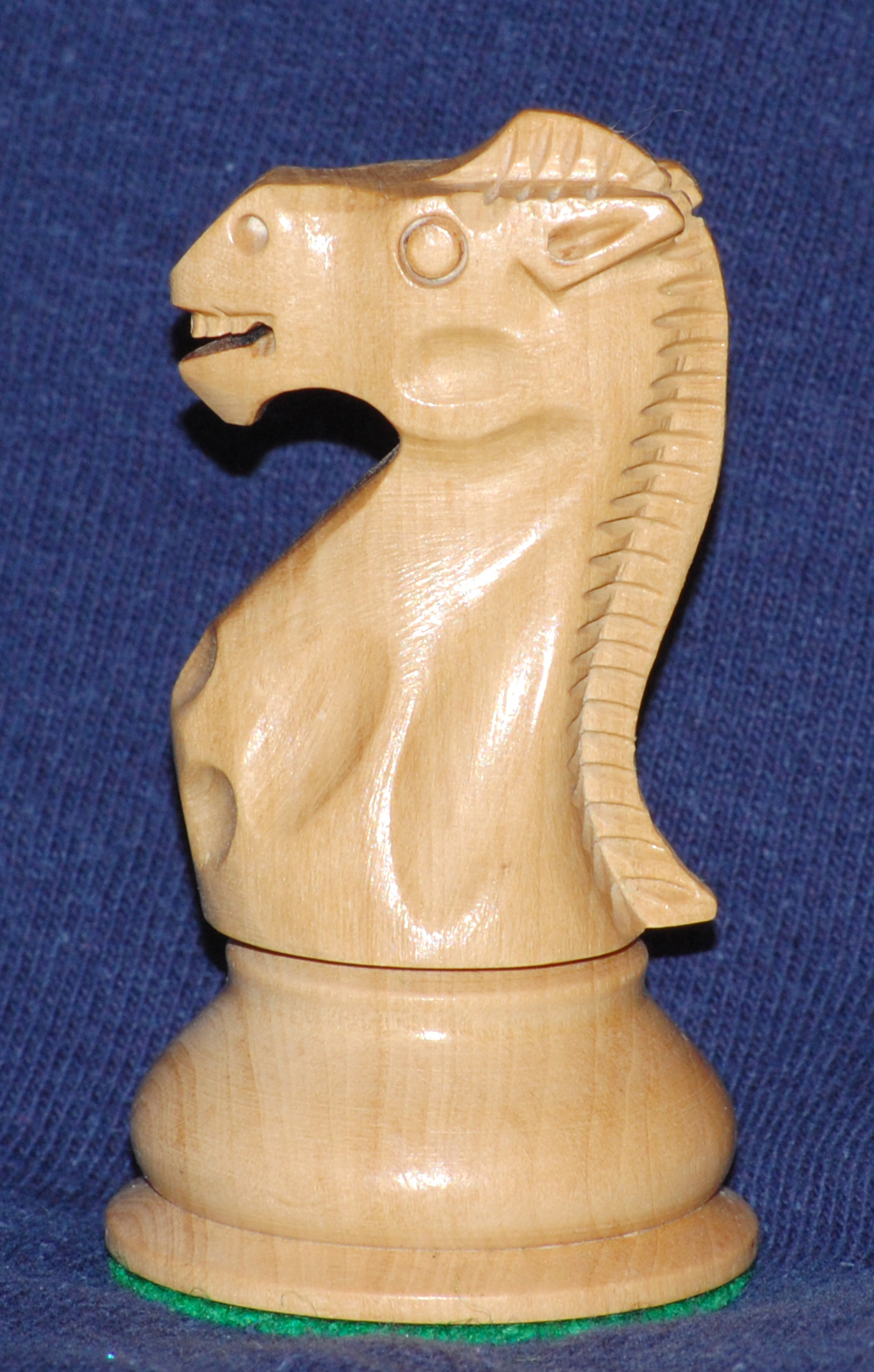

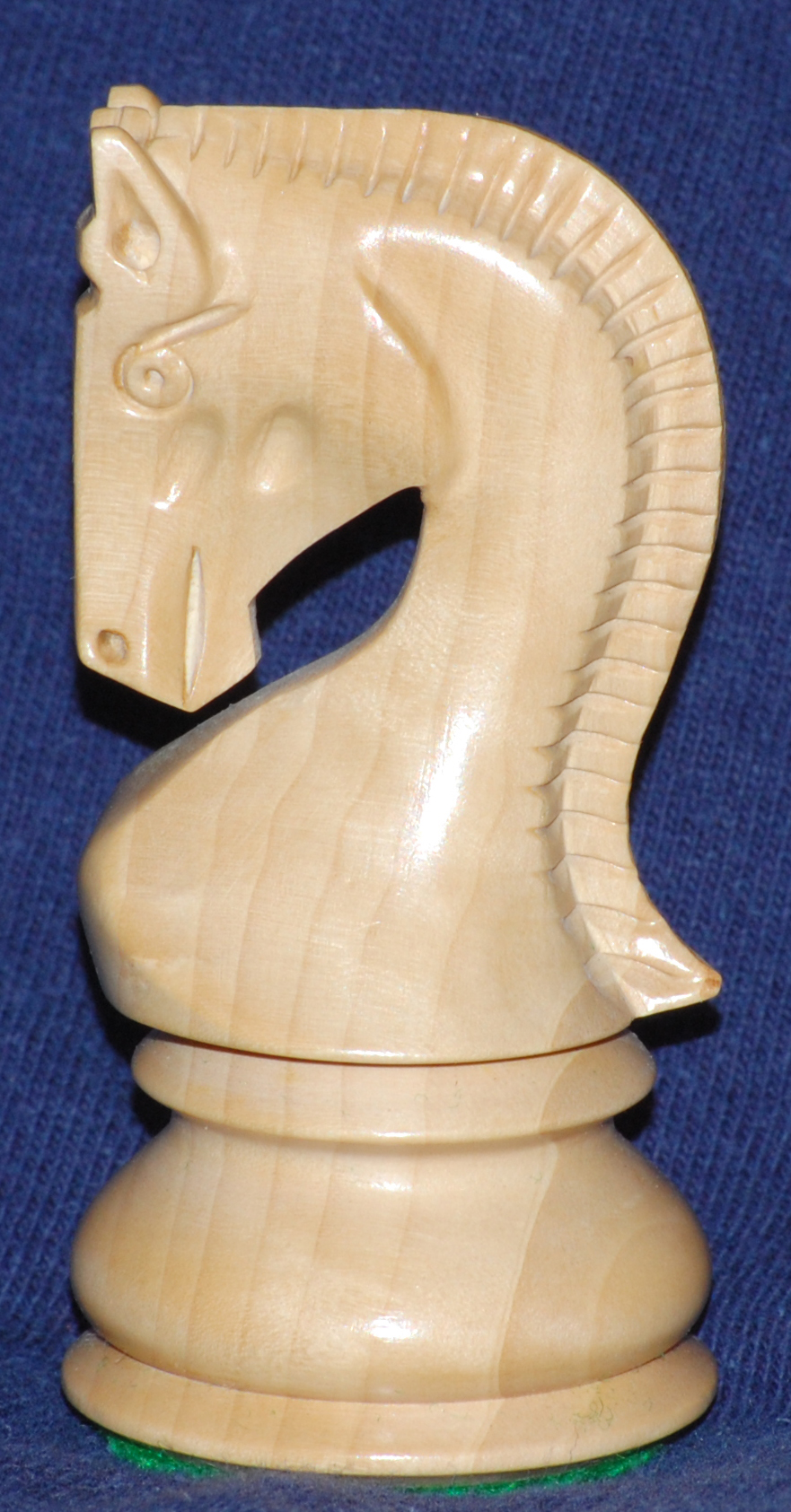

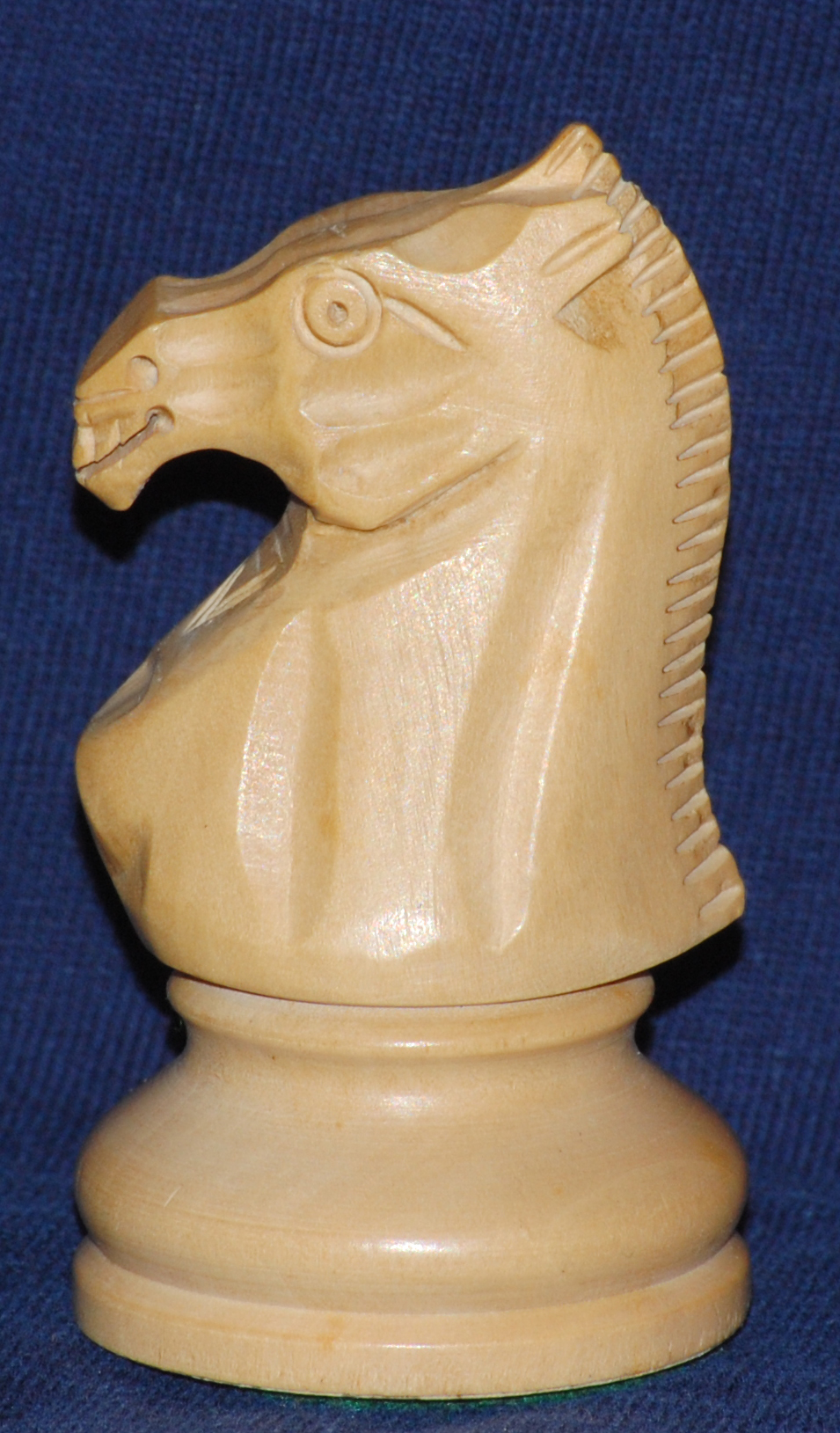

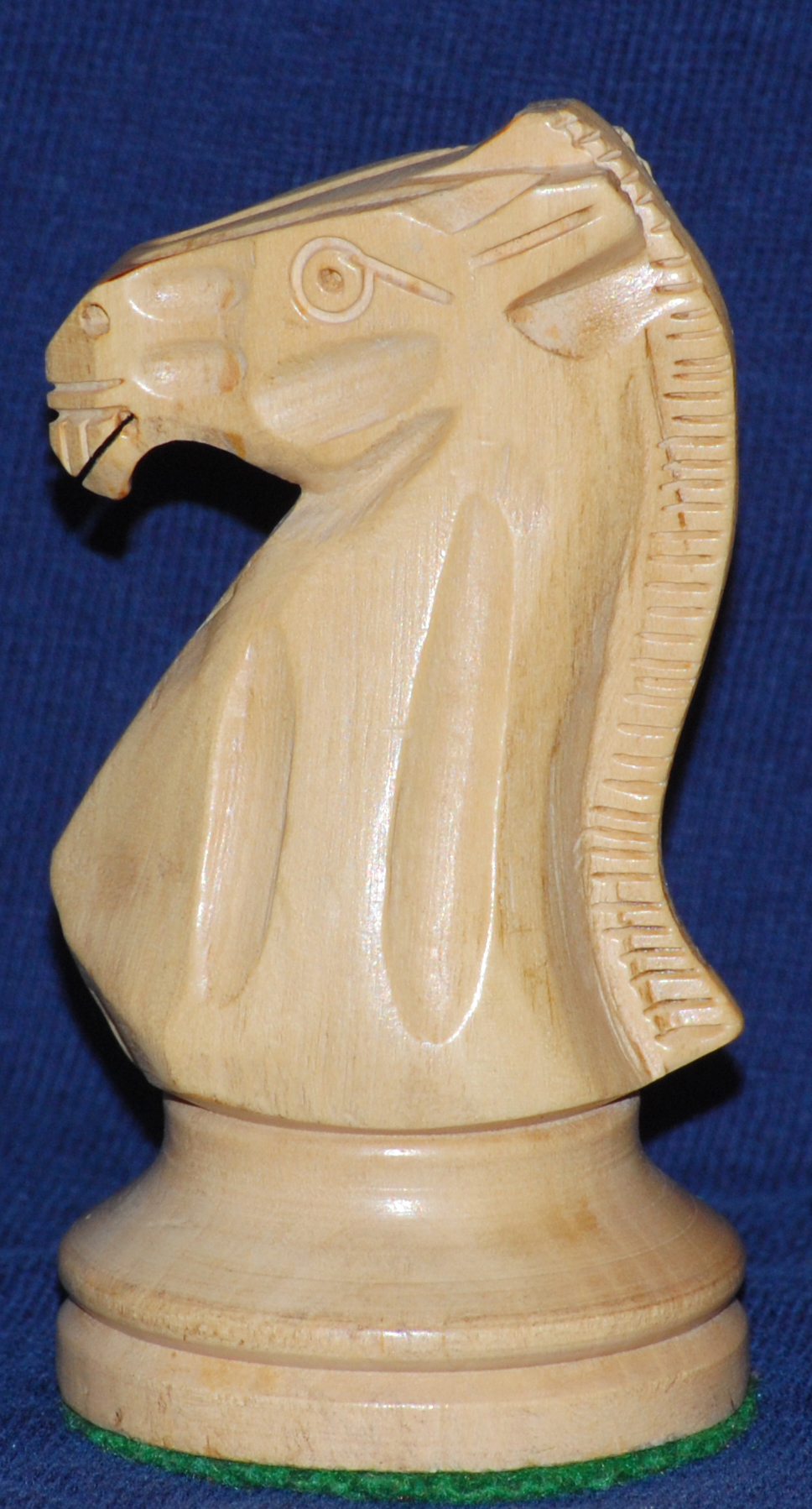

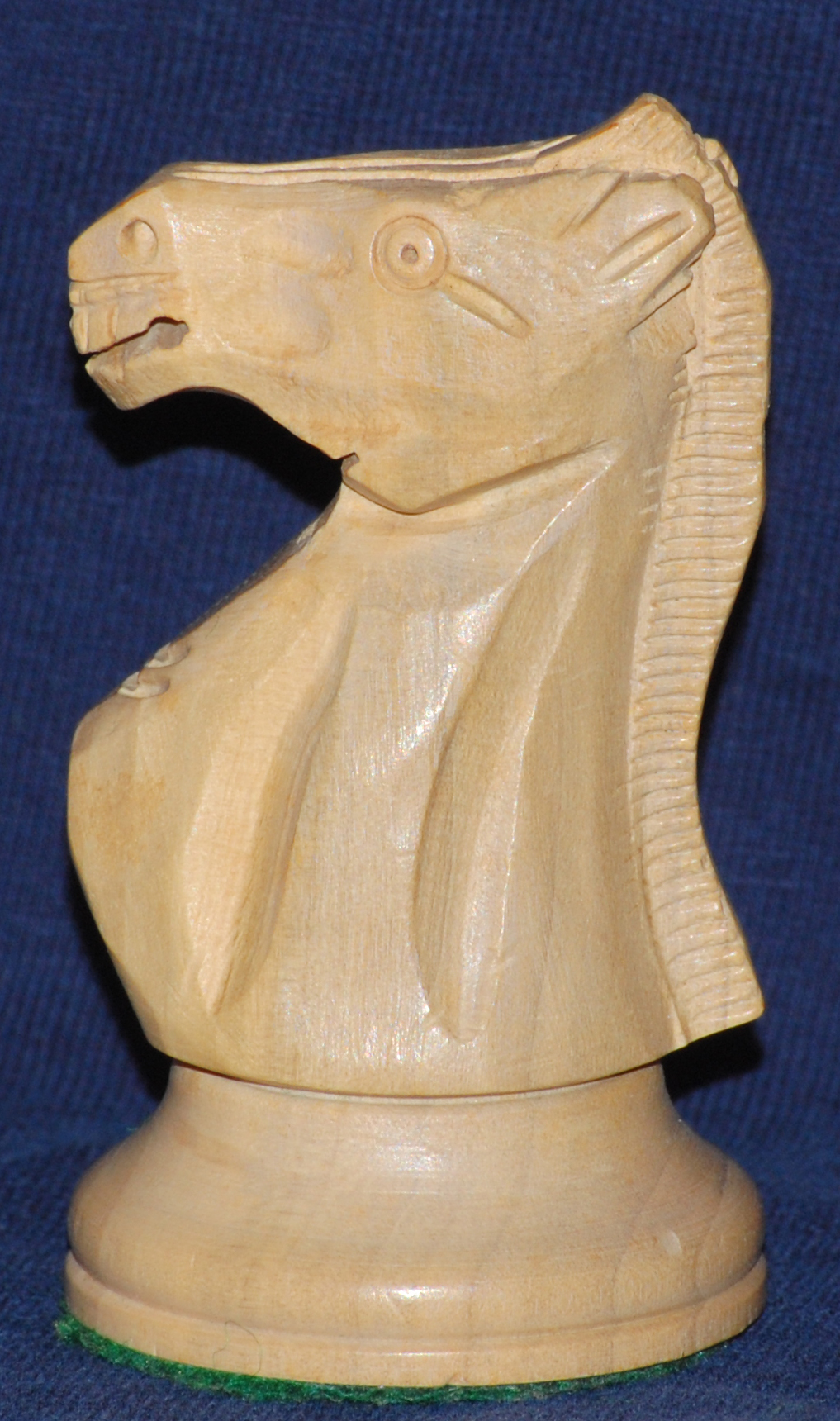

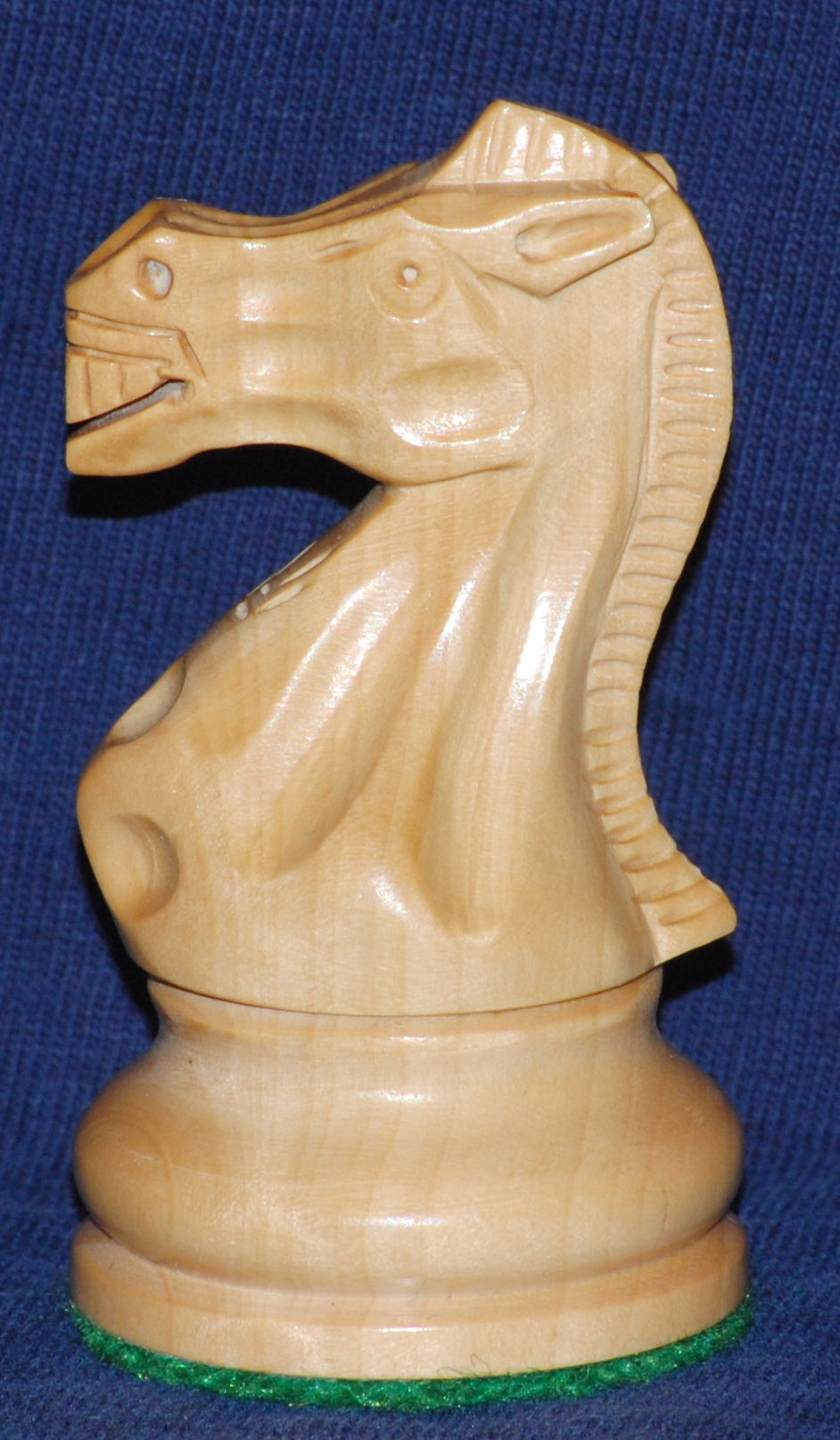

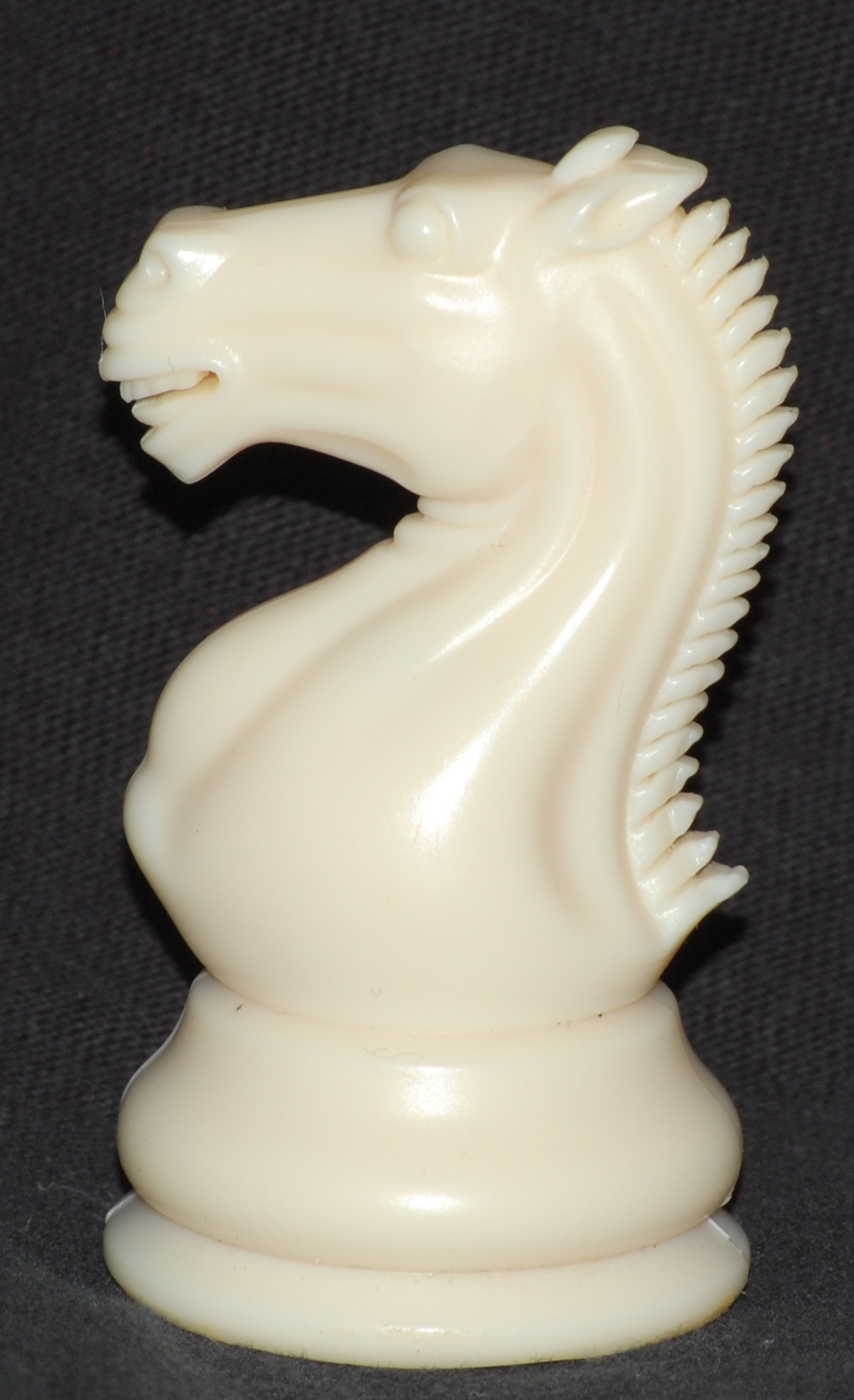

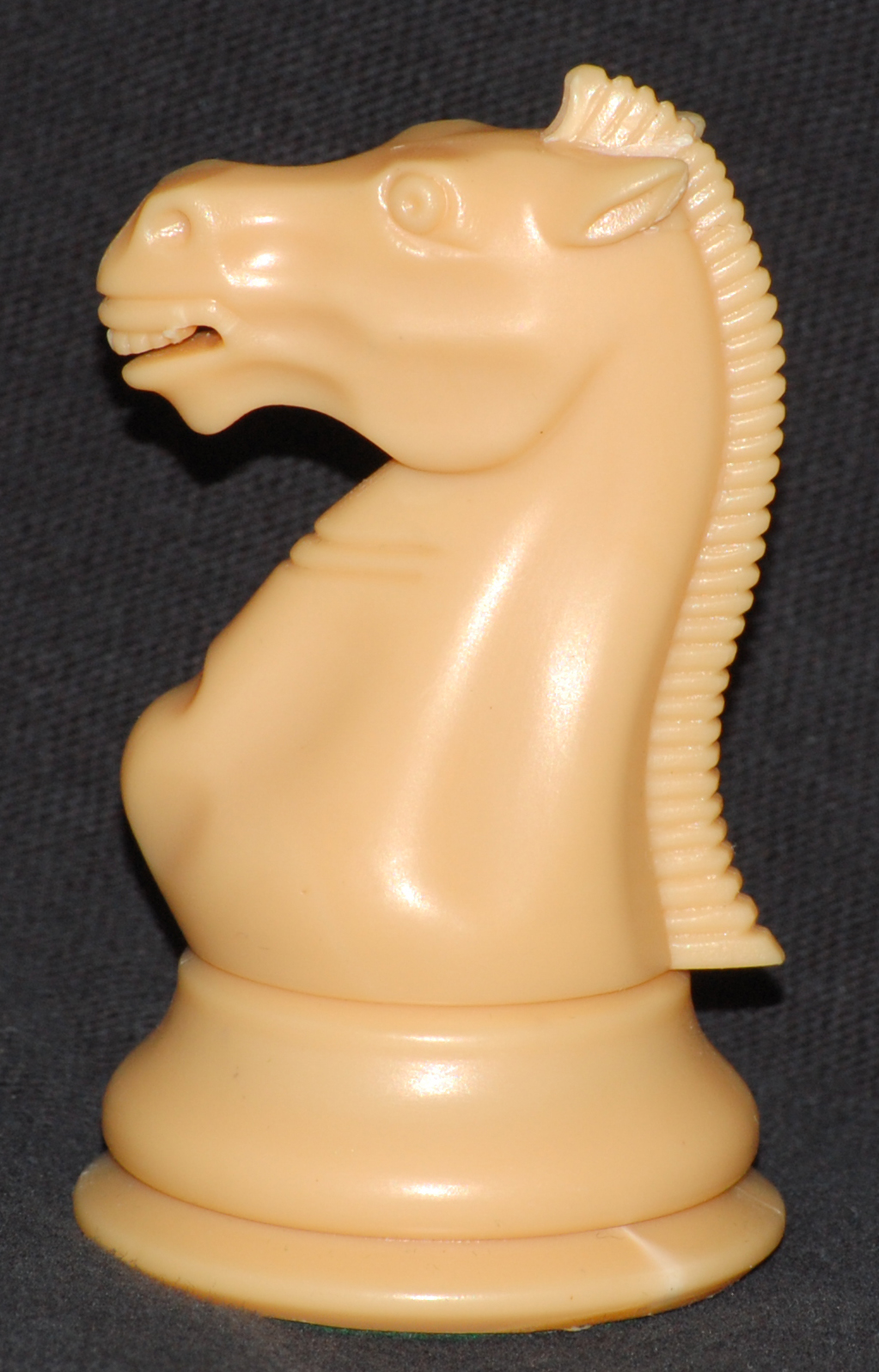

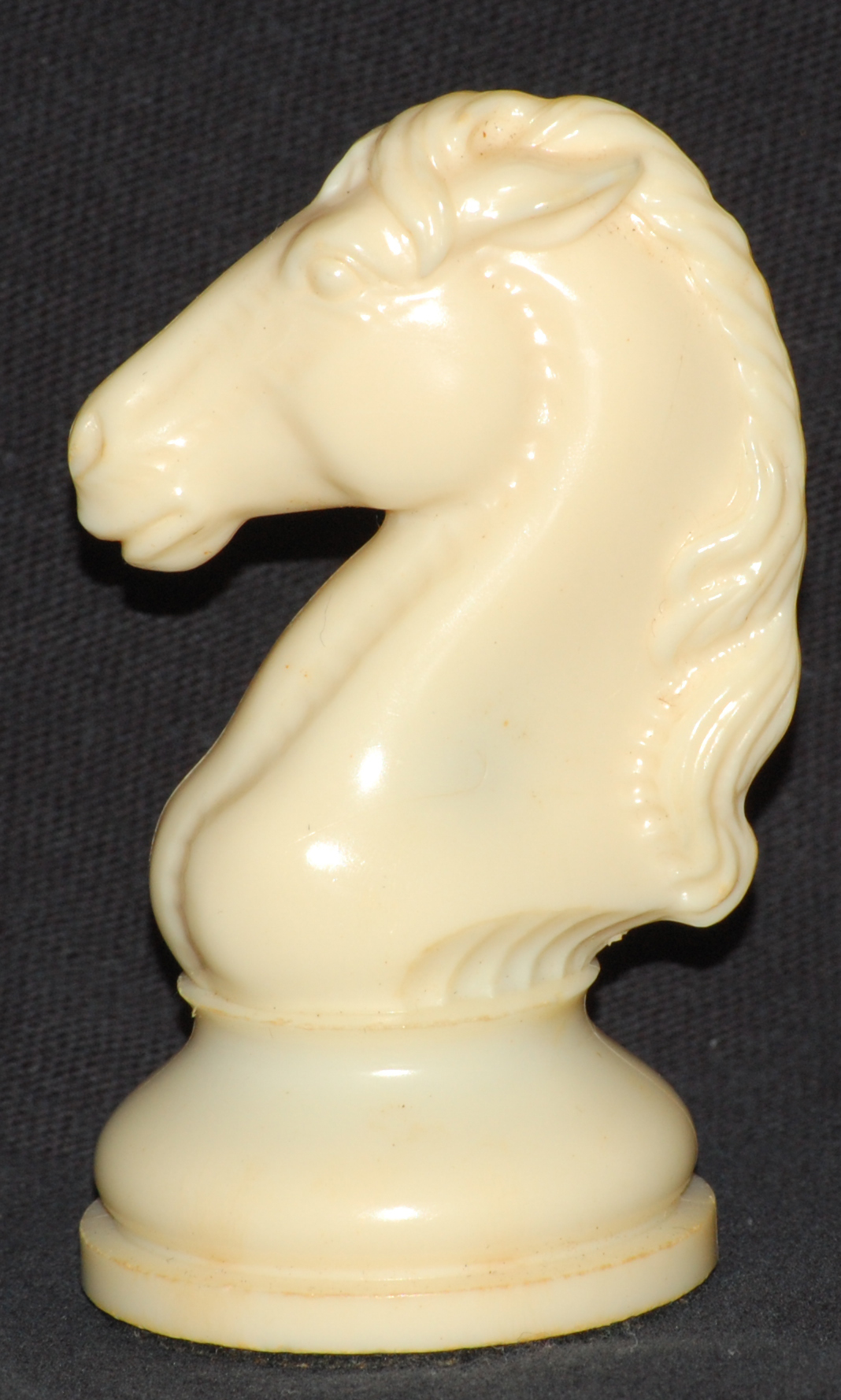

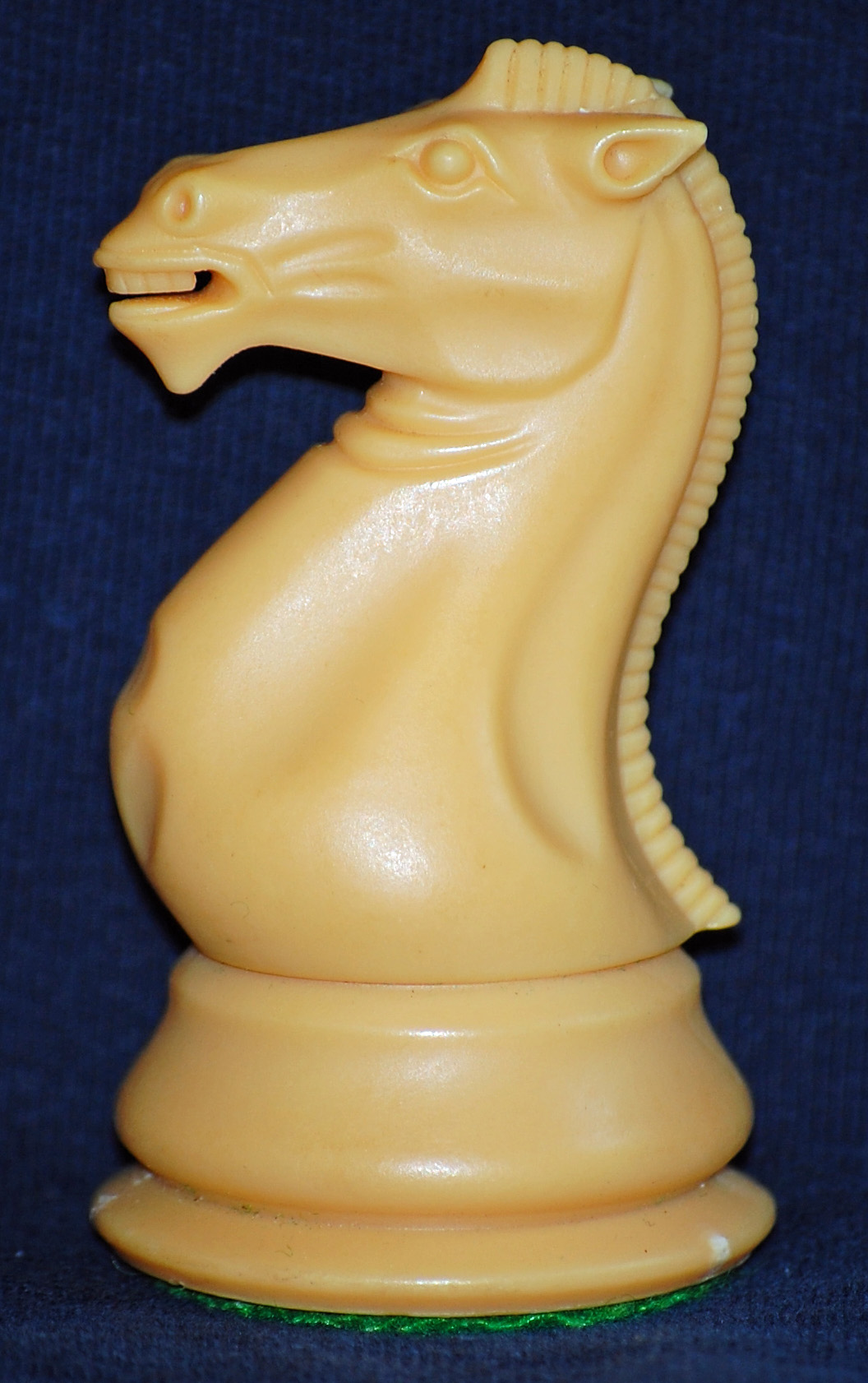

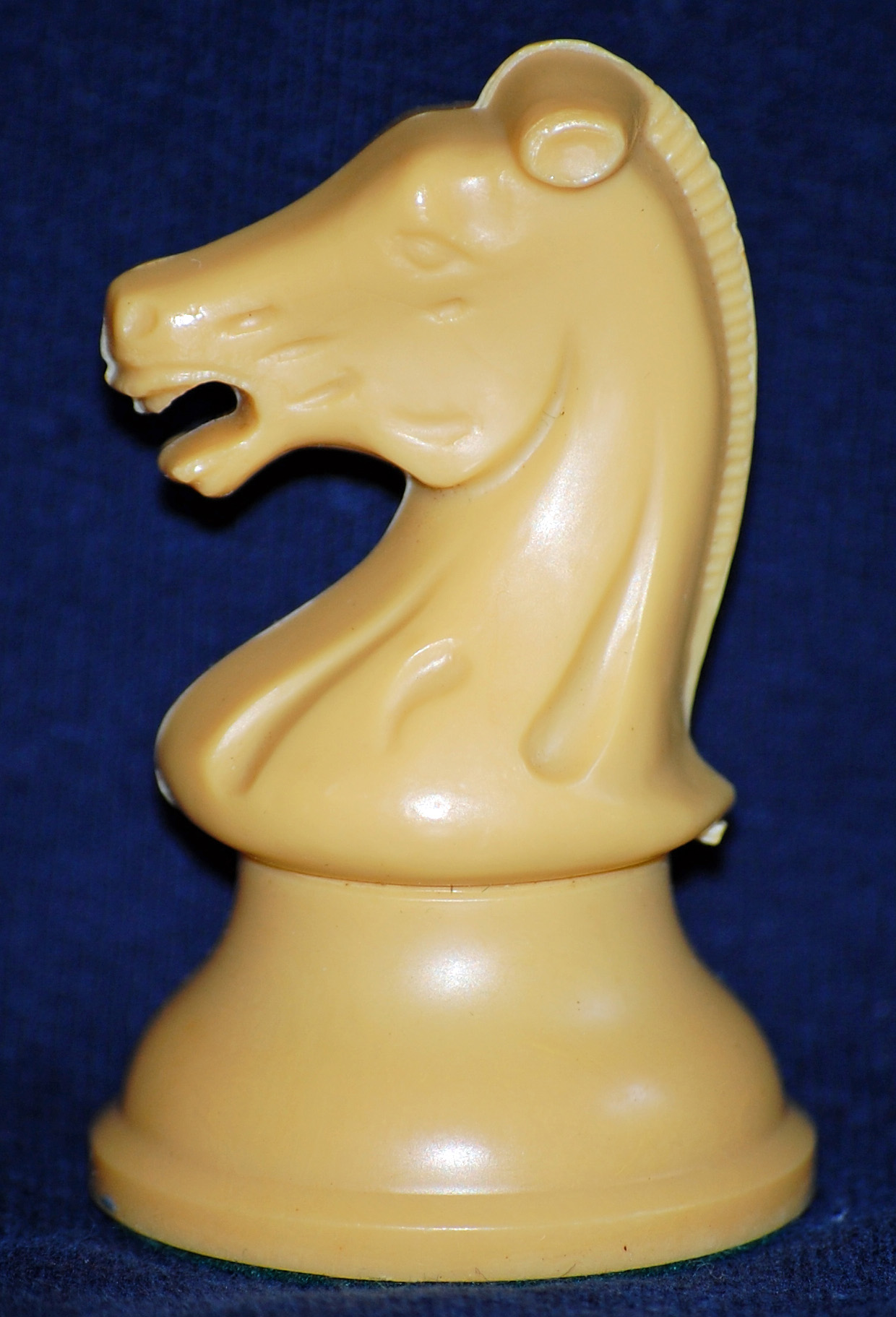

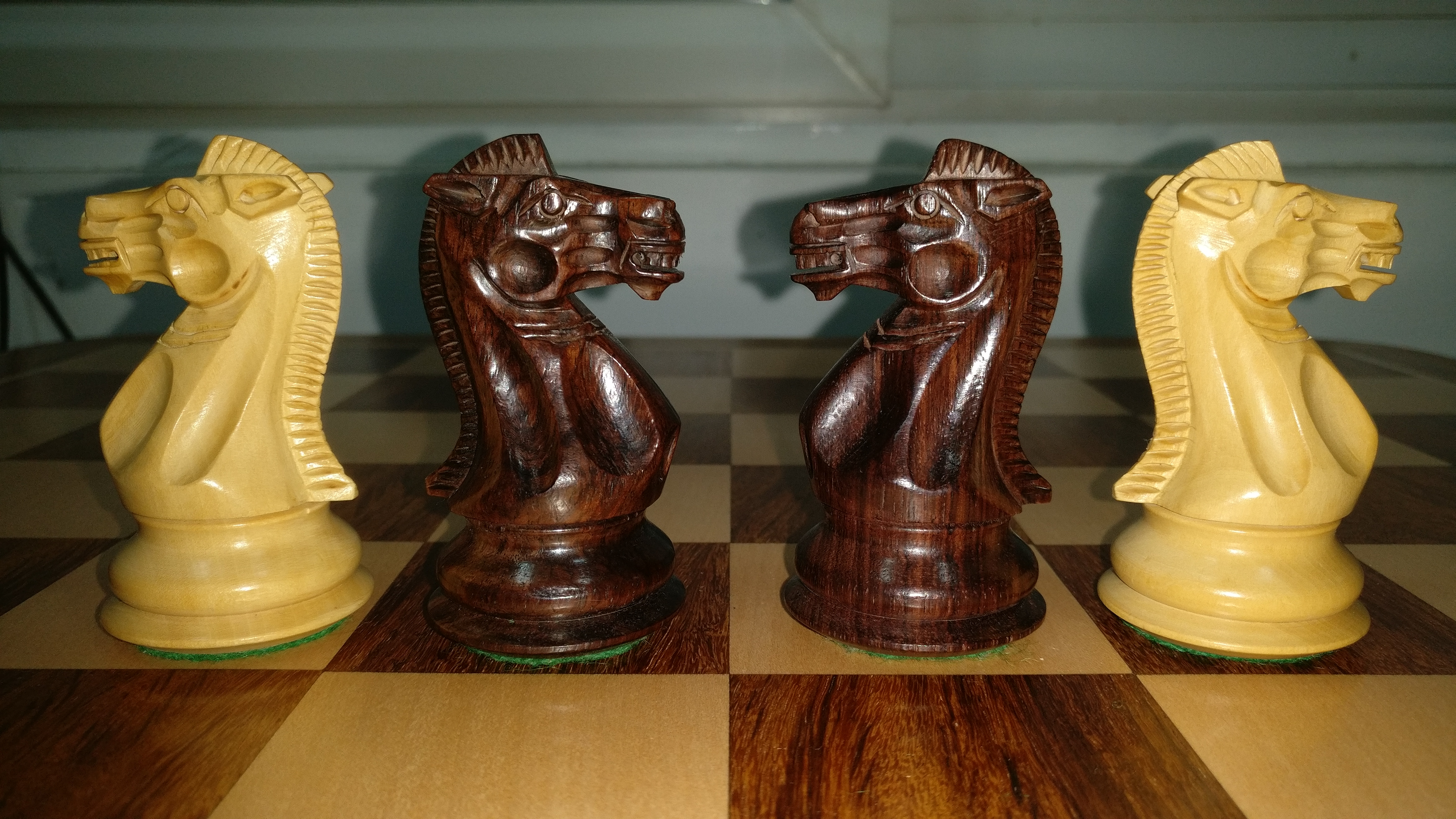

== Unicode ==
Unicode defines three codepoints for a knight:

♘ U+2658 White Chess Knight

♞ U+265E Black Chess Knight

🨄 U+1FA04 Neutral Chess Knight

== See also ==
- (the) Exchange – knight (or bishop) for a rook
- Knight's graph
