= Nightrider (chess) =

Fairy chess piece

Position: e8 black cross, d6 black cross, a4 black cross, c4 black cross, f4 white pawn, d3 black cross, b2 white upside-down knight, d1 black cross

The nightrider (represented by an inverted knight) makes any number of knight moves in the same direction.

The nightrider, alternatively spelled knightrider and also known as the knightmare or unicorn (though the latter term sometimes refers to the bishop+nightrider compound), is a fairy chess piece that can move any number of steps as a knight in the same direction. The nightrider is often represented by an altered version of the knight's icon. In this article, the nightrider is represented by an inverted knight and notated as N, while the knight is abbreviated as S for the German name Springer.

The nightrider was invented by W. S. Andrews in 1907 and named by Thomas Rayner Dawson, who first used it in fairy chess problems in 1925.

== Movement ==
The nightrider moves and captures any number of steps as a knight (2 vertically and 1 horizontally, or 2 horizontally and 1 vertically) in the same direction. Intervening landing squares must be vacant. For example, a nightrider on b2 can reach the empty square c4 and continue forward to empty squares d6 and e8, but it cannot jump over a pawn on f4 to reach h5.

== Value ==
The nightrider is worth about 5 pawns, similar to the rook. It can control up to 12 squares on an 8×8 board as opposed to the rook's 14. It is stronger than the rook in the opening and middlegame, as it can more easily maneuver around pieces than the rook, but the rook is stronger in the endgame. While king and rook vs. king can force checkmate, king and nightrider vs. king cannot checkmate at all.

The nightrider, like the knight, can jump over blockades in closed positions and is good at delivering forks. The nightrider can triangulate while the knight cannot. King, nightrider, and knight vs. king can force checkmate.

== Observations ==
T. R. Dawson
British Chess Magazine (1925)

Position: c7 white king, a6 black king, c6 white upside-down knight, c3 white knight

#5 (Nightrider c6)

The king together with two knights cannot win the endgame against a lone king (see Two knights endgame), but the king together with a knight and a nightrider can. This is because, unlike the knight, the nightrider can gain a tempo.

Solution: 1. Ne7! Ka7 2. Ng3 Ka8 3. Ne4 Ka7 4. Sb5+ Ka8 5. Nd2#

Position: c6 black rook, d6 black rook, d5 black king, c3 white king, b1 white upside-down knight, e1 white upside-down knight

Mutual discovered perpetual check with nightriders

With nightriders on the board, a mutual discovered perpetual check is possible.

A possible continuation would be: 1. Kd3+ Kc5+ 2. Kc3+ Kd5+ 3. Kd3+ Kc5+, etc.

Position: e7 black pawn, f7 black king, f5 white pawn, d3 white upside-down knight, f1 white rook, g1 white king

Black to move

In the diagrammed position, 1...e5 2.fxe6+ (capturing en passant) results in triple check.
