= Grasshopper chess =

Chess variant

Position: a8 black rook, b8 black knight, c8 black bishop, d8 black queen, e8 black king, f8 black bishop, g8 black knight, h8 black rook, a7 black upside-down queen, b7 black upside-down queen, c7 black upside-down queen, d7 black upside-down queen, e7 black upside-down queen, f7 black upside-down queen, g7 black upside-down queen, h7 black upside-down queen, a6 black pawn, b6 black pawn, c6 black pawn, d6 black pawn, e6 black pawn, f6 black pawn, g6 black pawn, h6 black pawn, a3 white pawn, b3 white pawn, c3 white pawn, d3 white pawn, e3 white pawn, f3 white pawn, g3 white pawn, h3 white pawn, a2 white upside-down queen, b2 white upside-down queen, c2 white upside-down queen, d2 white upside-down queen, e2 white upside-down queen, f2 white upside-down queen, g2 white upside-down queen, h2 white upside-down queen, a1 white rook, b1 white knight, c1 white bishop, d1 white queen, e1 white king, f1 white bishop, g1 white knight, h1 white rook

Grasshopper chess. The 2nd and 7th ranks are occupied by grasshoppers.

Grasshopper chess is a chess variant in which pawns can promote to the fairy piece grasshopper. The grasshopper (shown as an inverted queen) moves as a queen but must jump over a piece and land one square past the piece that they jump in order to move or capture.

In some variations, grasshoppers may also be present on the board in the opening position, in addition to the usual pieces. For example, pawns can be moved forward and grasshoppers put along the 2nd and 7th ranks as shown in the diagram. Another possibility is to replace queens with grasshoppers in the initial position, where pawns are not allowed to take two steps on their initial move, but still promote to queens.
