= Henry Tate (poet) =

Australian poet and musician

Henry Tate (27 October 1873 - 6 June 1926) was an Australian poet and musician.

Henry Tate was born in Prahran, Melbourne, the son of Henry Tate, an accountant. He was a choir boy at a St Kilda Anglican church. He worked as a clerk and learnt music from Marshall Hall

== Literary work ==
Tate contributed verse to The Bulletin and other journals, and wrote a weekly chess column for a Melbourne newspaper. He coined the term "fairy chess" in 1914. In 1910 he published The Rune of the Bunyip and other Verse, and in 1917 a pamphlet, Australian Musical Resources, Some Suggestions, in which he demonstrated the possibility of the developing an Australian school of musical composers with a distinctive national character. He extended this argument in Australian Musical Possibilities, published in Melbourne in 1924. That year he became music critic for The Age.

== Musical compositions ==
His 16-part cycle "The Australian" is scored for solo piano, except for the final part, written for unaccompanied four-part male chorus. It received various performances in Tate's lifetime, and the alternative title "Gallipoli" came to be attached to it. Its first modern performance was in 2005, by Ian Munro and members of The Song Company.

== Death ==
Tate died on 6 June 1926. He was survived by his wife Violet Eleanor, née Mercer, who survived until 1963. They had no children.

== Legacy ==
Thanks to the efforts of Tate's brother-in-law, Ivan Mercer, many of his scores and other papers were donated to the Grainger Museum in Melbourne.
