= Madrasi chess =

Chess variant

Madrasi chess is a chess variant invented in 1979 by Indian Abdul Jabbar Karwatkar, who named the game after his home town. The game uses the conventional rules of chess with the addition that when a piece is attacked by a piece of the same type (for example, a black queen attacking a white queen) both are paralysed and become unable to move, capture or give check.

== Paralysis ==
Most of the time, two like pieces attack each other mutually, meaning they are both paralysed. En passant pawn captures are an exception to this, since the attack is not mutual. The status of an en passant capture is open to debate.

This paralysis rule is not usually extended to the kings, meaning that as in orthodox chess, the two kings cannot move to adjacent squares; when it is extended to kings, the variant is called Madrasi rex inclusive (sometimes shortened to Madrasi RI). Although it is possible to play complete games of both Madrasi chess and Madrasi RI, they have mainly been used as a condition in chess problems.

Position: c8 black king, d8 black knight, b7 black pawn, d7 black pawn, f7 white knight, c5 white rook, g5 black rook, h4 black rook, b3 white pawn, d3 black pawn, c2 white pawn, f2 white knight, g2 white rook, a1 white bishop, d1 black bishop, f1 white king

The position diagrammed demonstrates some of the peculiarities of Madrasi. The black king is not in check from the rook on c5, because the rook is attacked by the black rook on g5, meaning it is paralysed. In its turn, the c5-rook attacks the g5-rook, paralysing it. Likewise, the white rook on g2, also attacked by the g5-rook, is paralysed. The black rook on h4, however, is not paralysed and is free to move. The knights on d8 and f7 also attack each other, as do the pawns on c2 and d3, so these pieces also are paralysed. Note that the bishop on d1 is not paralysed by the knight on f2 attacking it – units must be of a similar type (both knights, both bishops and so on) for paralysis to happen.

=== Releasing paralysis ===
There are two ways in which a paralysis can be released. The first is for a non-paralysed piece to make a capture. In the example, White cannot play cxd3 because his pawn is paralysed, but he can play Nxd3, thus unparalysing his c2-pawn. The second way is to cut off the line of attack from the paralysing unit by interposing a third piece. For example, 1.Be5 in the diagram cuts the line of attack from the g5-rook to the c5-rook and so unparalyses it. As a result, the white rook on c5 is now giving check. The only way for Black to escape the check in this instance is to re-paralyse the checking rook, which can be done by 1...Rc4. White then has the reply 2.bxc4, which is checkmate: Black has no safe squares for his king, he cannot capture the checking unit, he cannot interpose a piece between the checking unit and the king, and he cannot paralyse the checking unit (note that ...Rxe5 paralysing the c5-rook is not possible because the g5-rook is paralysed by its counterpart on g2).
