= Grasshopper (chess) =

Fairy chess piece

White grasshopper

Black grasshopper

Common icons used in diagrams

The grasshopper is a fairy chess piece that moves along ranks, files, and diagonals (like a queen) but only by hopping over another piece. The piece to be hopped may be of either color and any distance away, but the grasshopper must land on the square immediately beyond it in the same direction. If there is no piece to hop over, it cannot move. If the square beyond a piece is occupied by a piece of the opposite color, the grasshopper can capture that piece.

The grasshopper was introduced by T. R. Dawson in 1913 in problems published in the Cheltenham Examiner newspaper. It is one of the most popular fairy pieces used in chess problems.

In this article, the grasshopper is shown as an inverted queen and notated as G, as used by the British Chess Problem Society.

== Movement ==
Position: h8 black cross, a7 black pawn, d7 black cross, g7 black king, b6 black pawn, d6 white pawn, d4 white upside-down queen, e4 white pawn, f4 white pawn, c3 white pawn, b2 black cross, d2 white king, d1 black cross

The grasshopper must hop over other pieces in order to move or capture. Here, it can move to any square marked "x", or it can capture the pawn on a7.

In the diagram, the white grasshopper on d4 can move to the squares marked with crosses (b2, d1, d7, and h8) or capture the black pawn on a7. It cannot move to g4, as there are two pieces to hop over. Black's king is not in check, as in order to attack a piece there must be an in-between piece to hop over.

== Example problem ==
V. Onitiu, N. Petrović, T. R. Dawson
& C. M. Fox (1930)

Position: a8 black upside-down queen, f7 black upside-down queen, a2 black pawn, h2 black upside-down queen, a1 black king, c1 white king, h1 white upside-down queen

White mates in 8 (with grasshoppers Ga8, f7, h2, and h1)

Solution:

1. Gh3 Gh4 2. Gh5 Gh6 3. Gh7 Gh8 4.Ge7 Gd7 5. Gc7 Gb7 6. Ga7+ Ga6 7. Ga5+ Ga4 8. Ga3#

== Related pieces ==
The problemist tradition includes several other types of pieces that also move by hopping other pieces. Variations include changing how many steps are made before or after the hurdle, how many pieces are hopped, or adding another move before the hopping move.

The BCPS classifies the Grasshopper under the larger family of Riderhoppers, which includes the rookhopper, bishopper, and nightriderhopper. Also included are the eagle, hamster, moose, and sparrow, which move and capture like the grasshopper but are deflected (to either side) 90°, 180°, 45°, and 135°, respectively, upon passing the hurdle.

The Locust family of pieces move like a grasshopper but capture the hurdle rather than the piece on the landing square. They can only move when the hurdle is an enemy piece and the landing square is vacant. This is similar to checkers but without limiting the range from the captured piece.

== See also ==
- List of fairy chess pieces
- Grasshopper chess
- Xiangqi and janggi feature a cannon with similar abilities
