= FIDE Album =

FIDE Album: 1914-1944/III

The FIDE Albums are publications of the world chess governing body, FIDE, via the World Federation for Chess Composition (WFCC), containing the best chess problems and studies of a certain period (usually three years in length).

Currently, problems submitted for publication in the album are reviewed by a panel of three judges. Each judge may give from 0 to 4 points for a problem; if the judge's combined scores is 8 or greater, the problem is included in the Album. Sometimes the necessary number of points is lowered to 7.5.

The titles Grandmaster, International Master and FIDE Master of Chess Composition are awarded on the basis of problems published in FIDE Albums: each problem included in an album is worth 1 point, and each study is worth 1.67 points, these scores divided by the number of composers in the case of joint compositions. For a problemist to be awarded the FIDE Master title, 12 points must be accumulated; for the International Master title 25 points are required; and for the Grandmaster title 70 points are needed (in each case, these points need not be gained in a single album; usually the points are accumulated over a number of albums).

The editor of the first FIDE Albums was Croatian chess player and the first Croatian grandmaster of problem chess (since 1975) Nenad Petrović.
