= Nenad Petrović (chess composer) =

Croatian chess problemist (1907–1989)

- Born: 7 September 1907; Zagreb, Kingdom of Croatia-Slavonia, Austria-Hungary
- Died: 9 November 1989 (aged 82); Zagreb, Socialist Republic of Croatia, Yugoslavia
Example chess problem by Nenad Petrović
Shakhmaty v SSSR, 1959 – 2nd prize
Position: b7 white queen, d7 white king, h7 black knight, b6 white bishop, b5 black king, b2 white pawn
Mate in four moves
Solution: 1. Qa6+! ...
1... Kxa6 2. Kc6 N~ 3. b4 N~ 4. b5#
1... Kb4 2. Qd3 Nf6+ 3. Kc6 N~ 4. Qb5#

Nenad Petrović (7 September 1907 – 9 November 1989) was a Croatian chess problemist.

== Chess career ==
Nenad Petrović was the first Croatian Grandmaster of chess composition and World Champion in 1947 in the solving of chess problems. In 1951, he started the chess problem magazine Problem which in 1952 became the official organ of the Permanent Commission for Chess Composition of FIDE (PCCC).

Petrović was the creator of the "Codex of chess composition", the starter and editor of 13 volumes of FIDE Albums, containing the best compositions from the period 1914–1982. From 1956, he was the vice-president, and from 1958 the president of PCCC. He organized the first World Congress of Chess Composition in Piran, 1958. In 1974, Petrović was made an honorary lifelong president of PCCC.

As a composer, he published some 650 problems, of which 121 were included in FIDE Albums. Many of them were records and tasks in chess composition.
