= Kasparov Chess =

Online chess playing site

- Company type: Internet chess server
- Website type: Social networking service
- Available in: Multilingual
- Founded: April 2021; 5 years ago
- Headquarters: France
- Founder: Vivendi
- CEO: Louis Germain
- Key people: Garry Kasparov
- Industry: Internet
- Total equity: 5.4M$
- Parent: Vivendi
- Website: k-chess.com
- Registration: Required
- Current status: Active

Kasparov Chess is a commercial internet chess server, internet forum and social networking website. The former World Chess Champion Garry Kasparov is affiliated with this online chess club.

== Early history ==
In 1999, Kasparov and Israeli investors established a commercial online chess club called Kasparov Chess Online. The site was launched in January 2000. To commemorate its opening, Kasparov played a simul with around 30 junior players from around the world, many of them online on his own chess server in 2000. Later in 2000, KasparovChess.com hosted a tournament of junior players.

The site never reached a profitable status and became defunct in 2002. Sometime after, the site became inactive, until this domain was used again in 2021.

== Financing ==
Kasparov Chess is financed by private investors and Vivendi, through its subsidiary Keysquare, a media conglomerate headquartered in Paris, France. In October 2019, Keysquare was allocated a capital investment of €3.5 million Euros from Vivendi to start the project.

Kasparov Chess has a freemium business model with a free option for some chess content coupled with a premium option charge of $13.99 monthly or $119.99 for a yearly subscription for all the available chess content.

== Chess content ==
Kasparov Chess offers chess puzzles, online chess, tutorials, articles, documentaries, podcasts and a chess master class taught by Kasparov; however, some of these features are only available to members with a paid subscription. At the launch of the company in April 2021, there will be available 50,000 exercises, 700 lessons and 400 hours of videos.

"We are showing the world that there is so much more to chess than strategy and tactics...It is a way of life and a way of looking at the world. I hope to bring all people into this experience, even if they've never played before, because chess can help them become everything that they want to be."

— Garry Kasparov.

== Competition ==
Kasparov Chess competes against other Internet chess servers. These include free online chess servers, such as Lichess and Free Internet Chess Server, as well as commercial chess communities including Chess.com, FIDE Online Arena, Internet Chess Club and Playchess, which utilize similar freemium subscriptions for chess content as Kasparov Chess.

== See also ==
- List of Internet chess servers
