= List of internet chess platforms =

This is a list of notable internet chess servers.

== Active ==
- Chess.com
- ChessBase
- Chessmaster Live
- FIDE Online Arena
- Free Internet Chess Server
- Internet Chess Club
- Kasparov Chess
- Lichess

== Defunct ==
- chess24
- Chess Live
- World Chess Network
