= Atomic chess =

Chess variant where pieces "explode" upon capture, removing surrounding pieces

A capture in atomic chess. Nxg7 causes an "explosion" in which the capturing knight, captured pawn, and adjacent black rook and bishop are removed from play. Adjacent pawns are unaffected.

Atomic chess is a chess variant. Standard rules of chess apply, with the difference that all captures result in an "explosion" through which the capturing piece, captured piece, and all surrounding pieces of both colors other than pawns are removed from play. Some variations additionally remove rules concerning check such that the king may be able to move into (or remain in) check.

== History ==
In 1995, the German Internet Chess Server (GICS) introduced the game, based on rules one of its users collected from friends who played offline. It was soon after incorporated into the Middle East Wild Internet Server (MEWIS) and other smaller servers before being implemented at Chess Live and Internet Chess Club in 2000, Free Internet Chess Server in 2003 and Lichess in 2015. It was added to Chess.com in late 2020. In 2021, 4.9 million atomic chess games were played on Lichess. Lichess also hosts 24-hour tournaments called "Atomic Revolution" with cash prizes where 8 thousand people participated in the 2022 edition.

It has garnered serious attention from chess grandmasters with Andrew Tang reaching quarterfinals and Jeffery Xiong reaching semifinals of Atomic Chess Championship 2017 hosted on Lichess, where both got knocked out by GM Arka50 who has won the championship in 2017, 2018, and 2020 whereas he did not participate in 2019 and 2021 editions.

== Rules and variations ==
Rules of atomic chess are the same as standard chess with a few important differences concerning capturing, check, and winning conditions.

=== Capturing ===
When a capture is made, an "explosion" occurs on the destination square of the capturing piece. This explosion causes the captured piece, the capturing piece, and all orthogonally and diagonally adjacent non-pawn pieces to be removed from the board. Captures that result in the explosion of a player's own king are illegal; therefore, a king can never capture.

=== Check ===
Black to move: Win or stalemate?

Position: a8 black king, b7 white rook, c4 white king

With Black to move, this position would be a stalemate in variations of atomic chess that do not allow a king to move into check, but a win for White in variations that do not enforce the rules of check. In no version of the game would it be legal for the king to take the rook.

Threats to the king can be direct or indirect. Putting a king in check is a direct attack and is sometimes called "atomic check". An indirect threat occurs when a player threatens to explode the king by capturing an adjacent piece. In most variations of atomic chess, players must respond to being checked in a similar way they would in traditional chess—by moving the king out of check, blocking the check, or removing the checking piece—but an exception exists when the checked player can win the game by exploding the checking player's king.

As the king cannot take another piece, it is possible to move the kings next to each other without a check occurring or to escape check. This possibility is often used by a losing player to defensively position his king next to his opponent's at endgame, hoping for a draw. Depending on the board setup, this strategy is sometimes optimal and allows the draw to be forced. At other times, a player can counter by forcing a win with a position such that a piece or pawn can be exploded next to their opponent's king without blowing up their own king, or they can force the opposing king away using their king and the remaining pieces on the board, which will typically result in a loss for the retreating king.

The variation of atomic chess played at the Internet Chess Club is one that does not enforce check at all, making legal any move, even one leaving the king to be captured directly in the next move.

=== Winning conditions ===
In all variations of atomic chess, a player wins by exploding the king of the opposite color without exploding their own king. This is usually done by capturing a piece on a square adjacent to the opponent's king or putting a queen next to the king that results in checkmate since a king cannot take any piece.

In variations that require a response to being checked, it is possible to checkmate an opponent to win the game, creating a situation in which a king is directly threatened and cannot make a legal move. This is sometimes called "atomic checkmate". It is likewise possible for the game to end in stalemate if a king is not directly threatened and no legal moves are possible.

When typical rules of check are not enforced, victory is only attained via the explosion of the enemy king. In these variations without check, the king may be forced into check and thus capture through zugzwang.

== Strategy ==
The first-move advantage enjoyed by White is much greater in this game than in standard chess. No attempts to prove a win for White have been successful, however.

Material sacrifices are more common in atomic chess than in chess. In the opening and middlegame, it is common to offer a piece in order to open spaces to seize an initiative.

=== Opening ===
A common opening trap

Position: a8 black rook, b8 black knight, c8 black bishop, d8 black queen, e8 black king, f8 black bishop, g8 black knight, h8 black rook, a7 black pawn, b7 black pawn, c7 black pawn, e7 black pawn, f7 black pawn, g7 black pawn, h7 black pawn, d5 black pawn, e5 white knight, a2 white pawn, b2 white pawn, c2 white pawn, d2 white pawn, e2 white pawn, f2 white pawn, g2 white pawn, h2 white pawn, a1 white rook, b1 white knight, c1 white bishop, d1 white queen, e1 white king, f1 white bishop, h1 white rook

A common response to 1.Nf3 in chess is 1...d5. In atomic chess this leads to a forced loss after 2.Ne5, threatening Nxf7. After either 2...f6 or 2...f5 White can play 3.Nd7. White's knight cannot be taken by any piece because of its proximity to Black's king, and Black cannot stop 4.Nxf8#.

White has the initiative in atomic chess, and many openings begin with a quick attempt to explode Black's d-, e-, or f-pawns, and thus the black king. For this reason, atomic openings are fraught with traps, and Black may have to respond precisely to defend. Several common traps begin with 1.Nf3 followed by Ng5 or Ne5, forcing Black to start with 1...f6, e5, or d6 to maintain rough equality. Games between experienced players follow more traditional opening principles, such as piece development, controlling space, and winning material.

=== Endgame ===
An endgame position

Position: b6 white queen, a5 black pawn, a4 white pawn, c3 white king, d3 black king

Black has connected kings and become immune to check. However, White can win by forcing the black king to be adjacent to the black pawn and then capturing the pawn.

1.Kc4 Kd4 2.Kb5+ Kc5 3.Ka6+ Kb5 4.Ka7+ Ka6 5.Qxa5#

Black is forced to retain the connection, or the queen will chase the king and deliver mate.

As with atomic opening theory, a small amount of endgame theory and analyses have been published online by strong players.

A common scenario in atomic endgames is to have two kings on adjacent squares. As a player cannot intentionally blow up their own king, a king can never capture another piece, including another king. Similarly, because a capture affects all adjacent squares, one king cannot be captured directly if it means destruction of the other. Moving one king towards the other is thus a strategy to achieve a draw. The player with the advantage must then maneuver into a position where a non-king piece can be captured that is adjacent to one king but not the other. If there is no piece that can be captured, the player with the advantage can promote two queens and force the opponent into zugzwang and therefore forcing the opponent's king away from their king. Creative use of zugzwang is a common tactic to force a win in these situations.

The Internet Chess Club variation of atomic chess ignores check completely, and thus leads to different outcomes in certain situations. For example, a king and rook vs. king endgame that would be a draw under normal circumstances can become a forced win on ICC.

== See also ==
- List of chess variants

Other chess variants based on explosions:

- Beirut Chess
- Stratomic
