= WCN =

WCN may represent:

- Warrior Care Network, a U.S. military veteran mental health program
- Westminster Cable Network, television station of Westminster College
- Wildlife Conservation Network, a non-profit wildlife conservation organization
- Wimco Nagar railway station, Chennai, Tamil Nadu, India (Indian Railways station code)
- Windows Connect Now, a Microsoft scheme for configuring wireless routers
- Wireless community network, a community wireless network project for Chicago, USA
- World Carfree Network, an international network of car-free advocates
- World Chess Network, formerly a commercial Internet site on which to play chess
- World Classical Network, a satellite service in Massachusetts, USA
- World Congress of Neurology, annual meeting of the World Federation of Neurology
