= Free Internet Chess Server =

Volunteer-run internet chess server

Free Internet Chess Server (FICS)
- Website: freechess.org
- Commercial: No
- Launched: March 9, 1995; 31 years ago
- Current status: online

The Free Internet Chess Server (FICS) is a volunteer-run online chess platform. When the original Internet Chess Server (ICS) was commercialized and rebranded as the Internet Chess Club (ICC) in 1995, a group of users and developers came together to fork the code and host an alternative committed to free access. A rivalry between ICC and FICS persisted for years.

Users download one of several graphical client programs, connect to the server via telnet, and can play chess or variants at a range of time controls. Games played on FICS are stored in a database, which has been used to train chess engines and to support academic studies.

FICS is based in the US, but the user base is international.

In addition to the games themselves, FICS offers chat rooms, pairing systems, analysis tools, and ratings. A relay system displays high-profile tournament games for users to see.

== History ==
=== Internet Chess Server ===
In January 1992, Michael Moore of the University of Utah and Richard Nash started the first online service facilitating live chess games, the American Internet Chess Server (commonly known as the Internet Chess Server or ICS). The initial release, accessible via telnet, was hosted at the University of Utah, but over its first two years it moved repeatedly across American universities, with additional servers opening and connecting to each other through Nash's Internet Ratings Server. The software was coded, supported, and operated by volunteers.

Later that same year, in July 1992, Daniel Sleator, professor of computer science at Carnegie Mellon University, took over operation and improved the code. One of his primary contributions was a mechanism to adjust clock times for the effects of internet lag. He announced plans to commercialize the service, copyrighted the code in 1994, and rebranded it as the Internet Chess Club (ICC) in 1995, charging membership fees.

Sleator's decision to commercialize the ICS was controversial, outraging members who felt the internet should be free and open, or who simply did not want to pay for a service that had been free. According to journalist Brad Stone: "Players lost their tempers and were exiled from the server, opposition groups were formed, lawsuits were threatened, ICC administrators were harassed, and plans to erect alternative servers were formed."

=== Development of a free alternative ===
FICS login screen.

Several former ICS programmers saw the move as exploiting their work and, on the day its rebranding was announced, they created a mailing list focused on developing an alternative. Work had been in progress, using Nash's original code, since Sleator initially revealed his commercialization plans. Several developers contributed, led by Nash, Henrik Gram, David Flynn, and Chris Petroff. The effort led to servers in several places around the world and in the United States, with the latter consolidating to form the Free Internet Chess Server (FICS), launched on March 5, 1995. Its tagline is "we do it for the game--not the money".

=== Growth and rivalry with ICC ===
After a few months, FICS had 1,500 members. In 1998, the Free Internet Chess Organization (FICS) was organized as a nonprofit organization, although the formal entity was dissolved in 2007. The server is still maintained and administered by volunteers. FICS never matched the popularity of ICC, but as of 2012 it had about 900 people logged in at any given time, and by August 2014 it had over 650,000 registered accounts. In 2016, 50,000 active players played a total of 23 million games.

The two servers used different names for similar features, which were then part of the rivalry. For example, very fast games in which each player only has one or two minutes to make all their moves are called "lightning" on FICS but "bullet" on ICC. The terms became shibboleths, marking members of each community and derided by the other.

In a 2024 book, Peter Doggers drew a comparison between the FICS and ICC rivalry and the later Lichess vs. Chess.com rivalry, with one side committed to free and open principles and the other offering more features for a fee.

== Usage ==
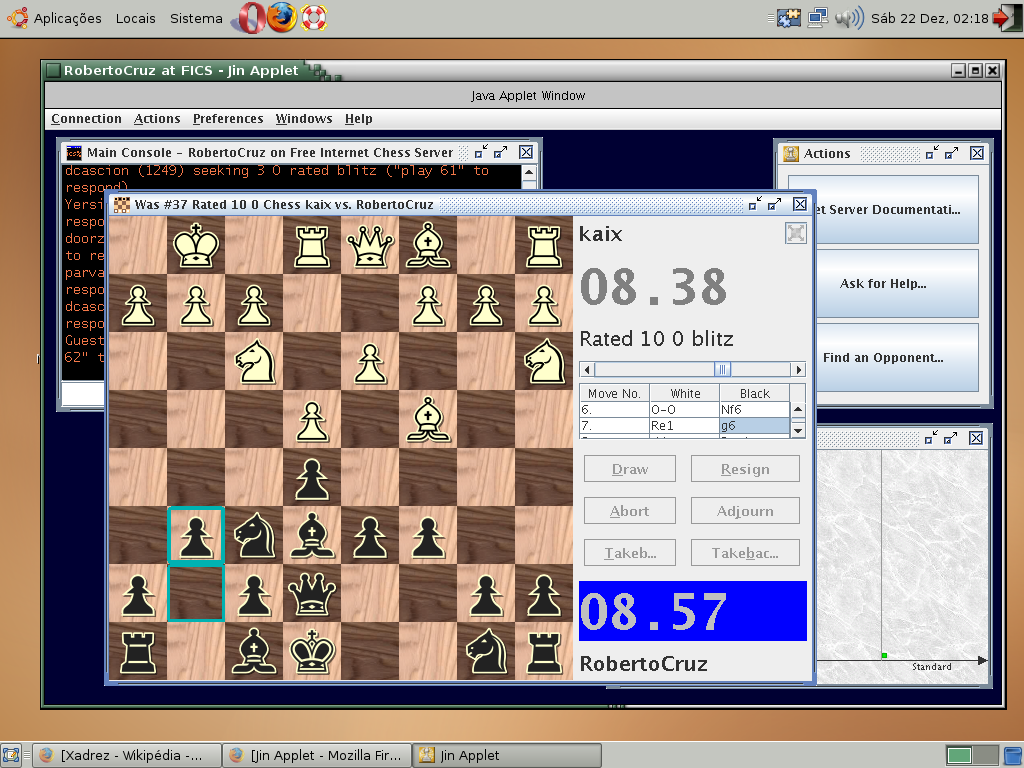
A chess game on FICS using the Jin interface.

FICS is accessible via telnet and was text-only by default. Before graphical interfaces, users would see a board created by ASCII characters, with the lines of the board created by hyphens and pipes, and pieces represented by letters. Whereas ICC has dedicated, proprietary graphical interfaces, several have been developed for FICS, with none having official status. The earliest were XICS and XBoard, with subsequent programs including WinBoard, BabasChess, Jin, Thief, Raptor, eboard, PyChess, and JavaBoard.

The traditional FICS interface was a dedicated client built with pre-web technology, but web-based interfaces are also supported. Users can play using an anonymous guest account or register for an account with a username. Registered users can play games rated using the Glicko rating system, with separate ratings based on time control and chess variant.

Once connected, discussion takes place in a wide number of function-specific or subject-specific chat channels numbered 0 through 255. For example, channel 0 is for administrators only, 1 is for general help, 50 is general chat, and 49 is for tournaments. FICS, like ICS, is based in the US, but it has been notable for its international diversity. Early descriptions of using the servers highlight playing against and talking with people from around the world, which was a rare experience in the 1990s.

=== Variants ===
In addition to standard chess, FICS hosts several chess variants, including suicide, loser's, atomic, wild (including chess960), bughouse, and crazyhouse. It became known for the popularity of its variants and the strength of its variant players. In particular, Chess Daily News said it is "well-known for featuring the best bughouse and crazyhouse play in the world".

=== Relay ===
FICS relays major live chess events. A bot takes the moves in ongoing games and relays them to special demo accounts bearing the names of players in the event. Users watch and comment on the games in progress. The relay has covered several World Chess Championships as well as Wijk aan Zee, Morelia-Linares and Amber Melody. The web-based Lichess platform obtains its tournament relays via FICS.

=== Archive ===
All games played by registered users are recorded and made publicly available for free. The FICS game archive has been used in chess opening studies, academic studies on memory, decision-making, and user interface design. The server and its archive have been used to train chess engines and chess-related machine learning projects, while the FICS code has been used to launch similar regional or thematic chess servers as well as influencing the design of other chess projects.

== See also ==
- List of internet chess platforms
