= Internet Chess Server =

Service to play, discuss, and view chess over the internet

The American Internet Chess Server, commonly known as Internet Chess Server (ICS) was a telnet-based chess server which allowed users to play live chess over the internet.

== History ==
In the 1970s, one could play correspondence chess in a PLATO System program called "chess3". Several users used chess3 regularly; often a particular user would make several moves per day, sometimes with several games simultaneously in progress. In theory one could use chess3 to play a complete game of chess in one sitting, but chess3 was not usually used this way. PLATO was not connected to internet predecessor ARPANET in any way that allowed mass use by the public, and consequently, chess3 was and still is relatively unknown to the public. In the eighties, chess play by email was still fairly novel. Latency with email was less significant than with traditional correspondence chess via paper letters. Often one could complete a dozen moves in a week. As network technology improved, public, widespread use of a centralised server for live play became a possibility.

Michael Moore, of the University of Utah, and Richard Nash recognized the potential of an internet chess server and created its first incarnation, hosted at lark.utah.edu and accessible through telnet. The official opening date of the ICS was 15 January 1992. John Chanak, William Kish, and Aaron Putnam moved the server to a host machine at Carnegie Mellon University in July 1992, and took over its operation. Although it was buggy and suffered from lag problems, the server was popular among a small group of chess enthusiasts. Over time, many features were added to the ICS, such as Elo ratings and support for graphical clients, and the server was made more stable.

In late 1992, Daniel Sleator, professor of computer science at Carnegie Mellon University, took over management of the ICS. He addressed, among other issues, the frequent complaint that players would lose blitz games on time due to network lag. In 1994, he copyrighted the code, and began receiving purchase offers from companies wanting to commercialize the server. There were questions about whether Sleator was right to claim that the ICS was his intellectual property, since he did not code the original server, although he had made substantial improvements to its code.

On 1 March 1995, Sleator announced his intentions to commercialize ICS himself, renaming it the Internet Chess Club, or ICC, and charging a yearly membership fee of US$49 (US$59.95 in 2007). This announcement was highly controversial among existing members. Many volunteers who had contributed in various ways to the flourishing of ICS were upset that anyone would attempt to profit from their efforts. Active players on the server who were used to the service being provided without charge were not pleased with the addition of the membership fee.

A handful of programmers who had worked on the original ICS became unhappy with what they saw as the commoditization of their project. They formed the Free Internet Chess Server (FICS), and continued to allow everyone to have access to all features for free. In 1996, John Fanning, uncle of Napster founder Shawn Fanning, started Chess.net, a commercial Internet chess server to rival ICS. Both services remain operational today.

== Protocol and access ==
The ICS protocol is a simple, text-based variant of the TELNET protocol. It is sparsely documented and not standardised, although a few reference implementations and several clients exist.

In addition to standalone clients, many servers also offer websites that can be used directly from a Web browser. These are popular with new users and users of public computers.

== See also ==
- List of internet chess platforms
- Chess engine
- Computer chess
- Correspondence chess server
