= Beirut chess =

Chess variant

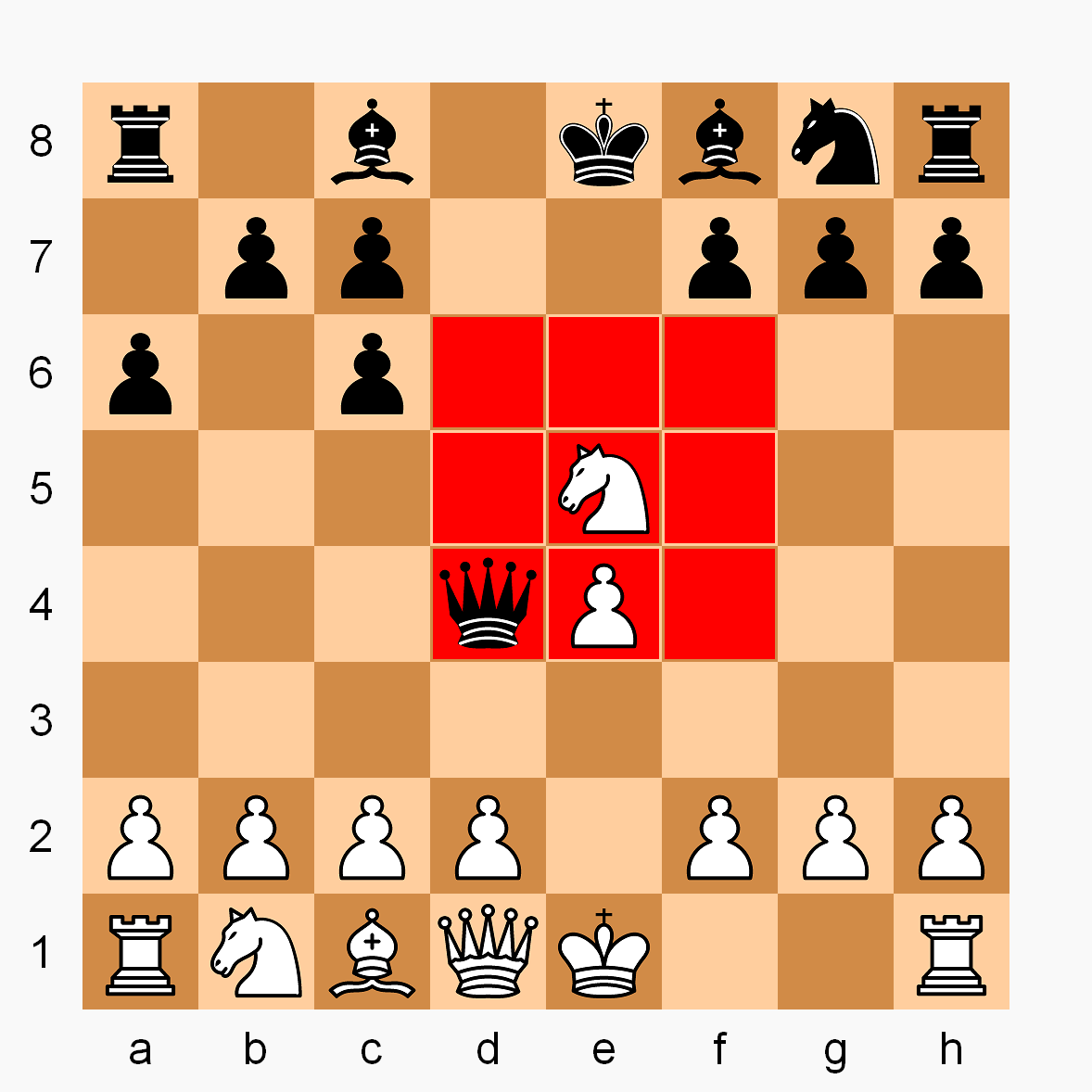
Beirut chess. Normally Black equalizes with 5...Qd4 (diagram) if White plays 5.Nxe5 in the Ruy Lopez, Exchange Variation (1.e4 e5 2.Nf3 Nc6 3.Bb5 a6 4.Bxc6 dxc6). But here the e5-knight was a bomb carrier and White can play 6.Boom! – winning the queen for knight and pawn.

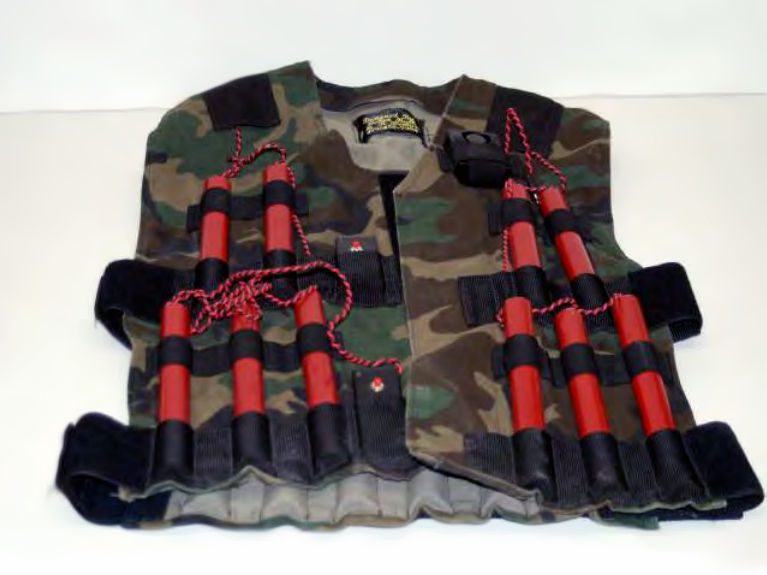
Bomb carriers can be thought of as wearing suicide vests.

Beirut chess is a chess variant invented by Jim Winslow in 1992. The game is played using the standard chess pieces and board, with each side having secretly equipped one of their men with a "bomb"—which can be "detonated" at any time, wiping out all men on surrounding squares along with the bomb carrier.

== Game rules ==
Beirut chess follows all the rules and conventions of standard chess, with one difference: Before the game begins, each player secretly attaches a red dot to the bottom of one of their pieces (but not the king). This piece is called a bomb carrier. On any turn, instead of moving, a player may say "Boom!" and overturn their bomb carrier. All pieces of either color on squares adjacent to the bomb carrier are removed from the game, as well as the bomb carrier itself.

There are two ways to win:

- Checkmate the opponent.
- Blow up the enemy king.

A captured piece may not be inspected to see whether or not it was a bomb carrier.

== See also ==
- Atomic chess – another variant based on detonations
- Chessence – another variant by Jim Winslow
- Stratomic – another variant based on detonations
