= Daniel Sleator =

American computer scientist

- Born: 10 December 1953 (age 72); St. Louis, Missouri
- Education: University of Illinois at Urbana–Champaign, Stanford University
- Children: Leon Sleator
- Awards: Paris Kanellakis Award (1999)
- Scientific career
- Fields: Computer science
- Workplaces: Carnegie Mellon University
- Doctoral advisor: Robert Tarjan

Daniel Dominic Kaplan Sleator (born 10 December 1953) is a professor of computer science at Carnegie Mellon University, Pittsburgh, United States. In 1999, he won the ACM Paris Kanellakis Award (jointly with Robert Tarjan) for the splay tree data structure.

He was one of the pioneers in amortized analysis of algorithms, early examples of which were the analyses of the move-to-front heuristic, and splay trees. He invented many data structures with Robert Tarjan, such as splay trees, link/cut trees, and skew heaps.

The Sleator and Tarjan paper on the move-to-front heuristic first suggested the idea of comparing an online algorithm to an optimal offline algorithm, for which the term competitive analysis was later coined in a paper of Karlin, Manasse, Rudolph, and Sleator. Sleator also developed the theory of link grammars, and the Serioso music analyzer for analyzing meter and harmony in written music.

== Personal life ==
Sleator was born to William Warner Sleator, Jr., a professor of physiology and biophysics, and Esther Kaplan Sleator, a pediatrician who did pioneering research on attention deficit disorder (ADD). He is the younger brother of William Sleator, who wrote science fiction for young adults.

Sleator commercialized the volunteer-based Internet Chess Server into the Internet Chess Club despite outcry from fellow volunteers. The ICS was for a while one of the most successful internet-based commercial chess servers.

From 2003 to 2008, Sleator co-hosted the progressive talk show Left Out on WRCT-FM with Carnegie Mellon University School of Computer Science faculty member Bob Harper.

He is also an active member of the competitive programming platform Codeforces.
