= World Chess Network =

- The World Chess Network game interface
- Website type: Internet chess server
- Dissolved: 2007; 19 years ago
- Owners: Master Games International, Inc.
- Creators: Master Games International, Inc.
- Revenue: Subscription-generated
- Commercial: Yes
- Registration: Subscription required
- Launched: 1997; 29 years ago
- Current status: Offline, merged to World Chess Live in 2007

The World Chess Network (WCN) was a commercial Internet chess server devoted to the play and discussion of chess that launched in 1997 and closed ten years later in 2007 when it was bought by Internet Chess Club and merged with Chess Live to form World Chess Live. As a typical chess server, the network provided basic services such as the conduction of live chess games over the Internet between two human players. Chess tournaments were occasionally conducted by the service, including a select few matches between known chess Grandmasters where spectators could watch the game in real-time. During its heyday, the network was frequented by professional chess players including notable Grandmasters like Elena Donaldson, Susan Polgar, Larry Christiansen and Larry Evans.

== Overview ==
The World Chess Network provided a number of services to its subscribers. Besides the facilitation of online chess games, it also provided members with a method of conducting online chess tournaments. The network used the Elo rating system for rating its players. The World Chess Network also conducted professional grandmaster tournaments, allowing spectators to watch these matches live, with professional commentaries. It also advertised itself as a venue for real-world chess players seeking to improve their playing skills. The network facilitated private chess lessons from professional players, usually via arrangement with the professional player with an additional cost. It also provided a service called Banter Chess; With this service, spectators watched two Masters play a game while explaining their moves and thoughts out loud, allowing the spectators to learn how high-ranked players conduct their games. Lectures about playing chess professionally were also given by the many Masters on the site.

For players not currently playing games, the network offered regular chat channels so that players could schedule or discuss games, among other things.

The interface used by the website was the a proprietary chess software called Mgichess. The software has arrangements to try to detect players using the assistance of chess programs. It does this by detecting changes in window input focus, based on information on the activities being undertaken on the computer that the program is able to detect.

== History ==
The World Chess Network was originally created as an Internet chess server by Master Games International, Inc. with the support of chess philanthropist Dato Tan Chin Nam. It was home to many recognized chess Grandmasters and International Masters such as Susan Polgar, Larry Christiansen and Larry Evans.

In the 1999 policy board meeting of the United States Chess Federation, a proposal was made for a strategic alliance between the World Chess Network and the USCF.

On 29 May 2007, WCN was bought by the Internet Chess Club. It was then merged with Chess Live, another Internet chess server acquired by Internet Chess Club from GamesParlor. The result of the acquisition and merger was the formation of World Chess Live, a new Internet chess server that merged features of both services.

== Coverage ==

The site itself has been reviewed on Chess Central, a notable online chess resource, by chess grandmaster, Susan Polgar. Polgar has also referred to the World Chess Network as a major chess "company". Another well-known online chess website, ChessBase, has featured the World Chess Network in at least one article. The article featured a match on the network between American Grandmaster (GM) Larry Christiansen and the Canadian International Master (IM) Pascal Charbonneau. The network has also received attention from other chess-specialty sites such as Chessville. The site also has been featured as a popular chess play site on About.com.

== See also ==
- List of Internet chess servers
