= Chess Live =

Internet chess server

Chess Live was a subscription Internet chess server. Initially affiliated with the United States Chess Federation, it opened on August 8, 2000, under the name US Chess Live. It closed on 29 May 2007, when it was bought by Internet Chess Club and merged with World Chess Network to form World Chess Live.

== Membership ==
There were three membership options: Trial, Basic, and Royal; Basic and Royal levels required periodic payments. Higher levels of membership included more features, such as the ability to observe or participate in certain tournaments often held on the server.

== Features ==
In addition to providing Internet users the opportunity to engage in games of chess with others, Chess Live also provided free lectures on skill and tactics to improve one's ability at the game.

Chess Live also included instant messaging features and the ability to chat with other users in IRC-like public chat rooms.

There were a range of paid and voluntary staff positions to ensure the smooth and effective running of the system.

== Connection clients ==
Registered users used a client to connect to the server. At the end there were two versions of the client available: version 4.2.00, an installed program; and version 2.5.1, implemented in Java and that could be run from virtually any Internet-connected computer with a Java-enabled Web browser. Royal members could use non-Chess Live interfaces to connect to the server, such as Thief 1.1, Winboard, or countless other interfaces.

== Cheating detection measures ==
The software had arrangements to try to detect players using the assistance of chess programs. It did this, in part, by detecting task switching activities, based on information being undertaken on the computer that the program was able to detect.

== See also ==
- List of Internet chess servers
