= Lichess =

Open-source online chess platform

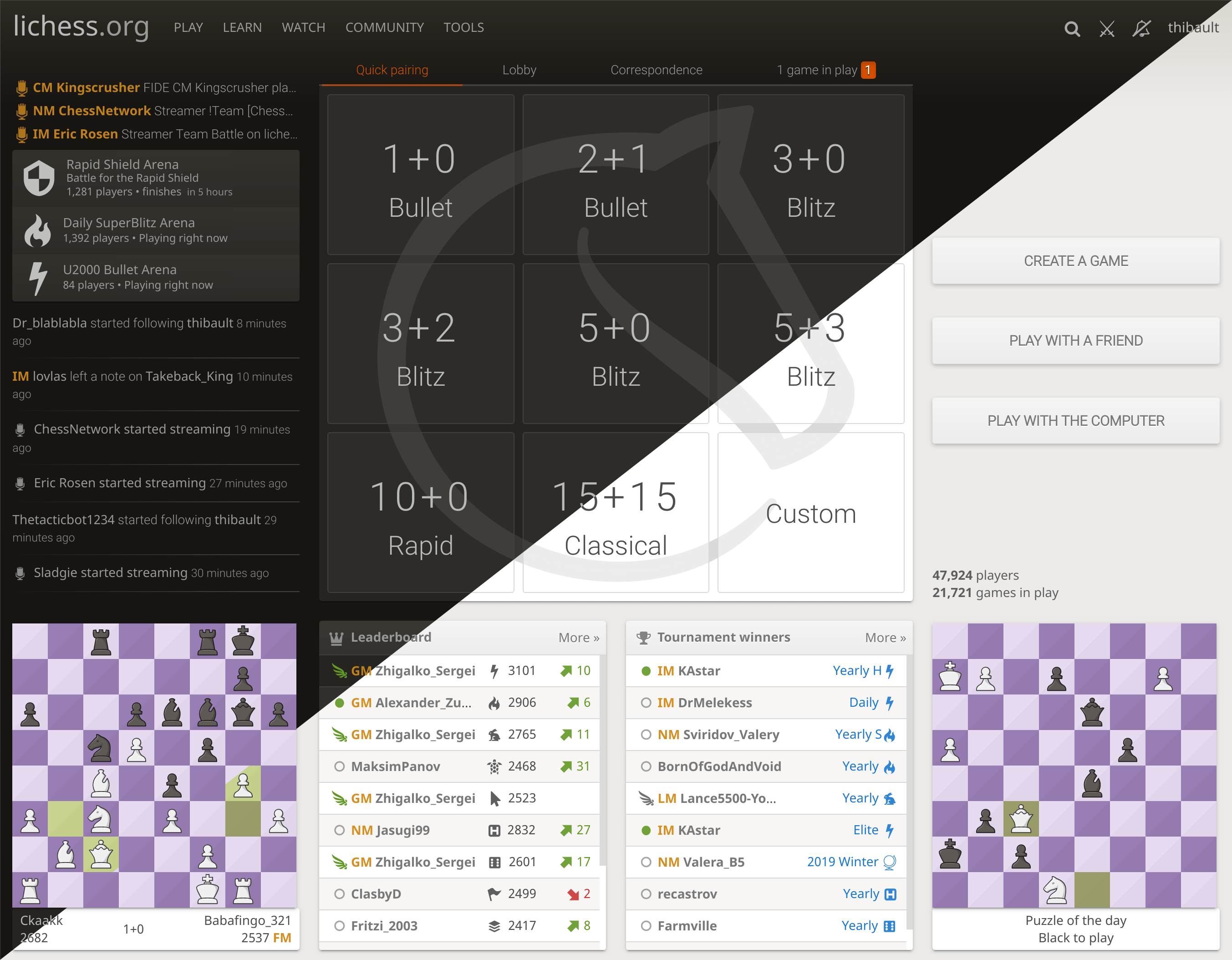
- Screenshot
- Website type: Internet chess server
- Available in: English, others (Note: Portions of the website have been translated to over 80 languages. About 30 of these are marked as "complete" but the terms of service, privacy policy, blog posts, and coach biographies are not yet fully translated.)
- Creator: Thibault Duplessis
- Website: lichess.org
- Advertising: No
- Commercial: No
- Registration: Optional
- Launched: 20 June 2010 (16 years ago)
- Current status: Active
- Native clients on: Android; iOS; Web
- Written in: Scala; TypeScript; Rust; Sassy CSS; Dart; Python

Lichess (/ˈliː.tʃɛs/, LEE-ches) is an internet chess server that is free and open-source, run by a non-profit organization of the same name. Users of the site may play anonymously or register an account to play games to earn a rating on Lichess. Lichess is ad-free and all the features are available for free, as the site is funded by donations from patrons, who receive a special badge as thanks for their support. Its features include chess puzzles, computer analysis, tournaments and chess variants.

== History ==
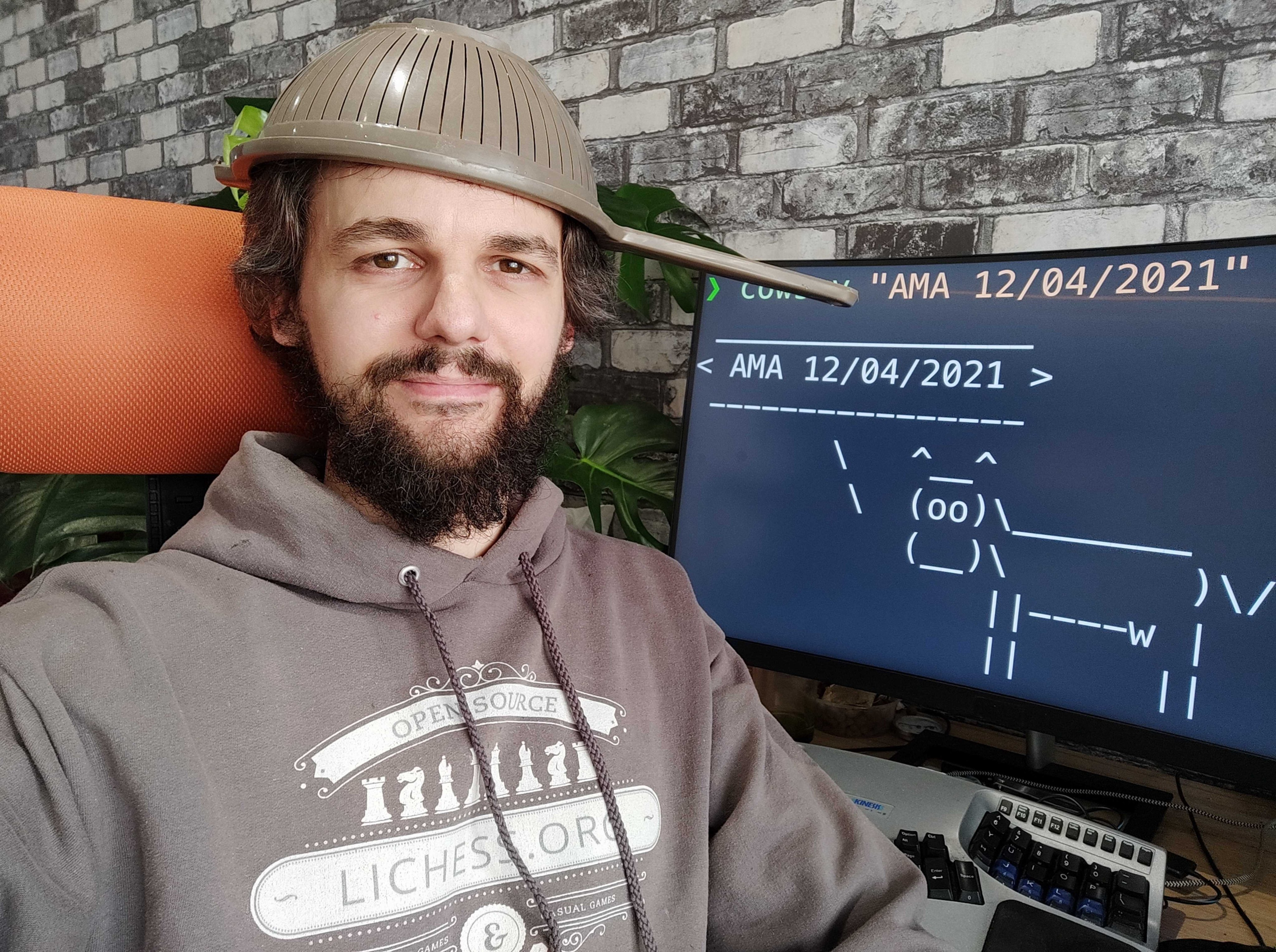
Founder Thibault Duplessis in 2021

Lichess was founded in 2010 by French programmer Thibault Duplessis. The software running Lichess and the design are open source under the AGPL license and other free and non-free licenses. The name Lichess is a "combination of live/light/libre and chess".

On 11 February 2015, an official Lichess mobile app was released for Android devices. An app for mobile devices running iOS was released on March 4, 2015. A new V2 version was released on June 6, 2024 later superseding the previous versions.

As of 27 June 2026, lichess.org had a global rank of 277 on Similarweb, with most of its traffic coming from Russia, the United States, Germany and Turkey.

== Tournaments and events ==
=== Titled Arenas ===
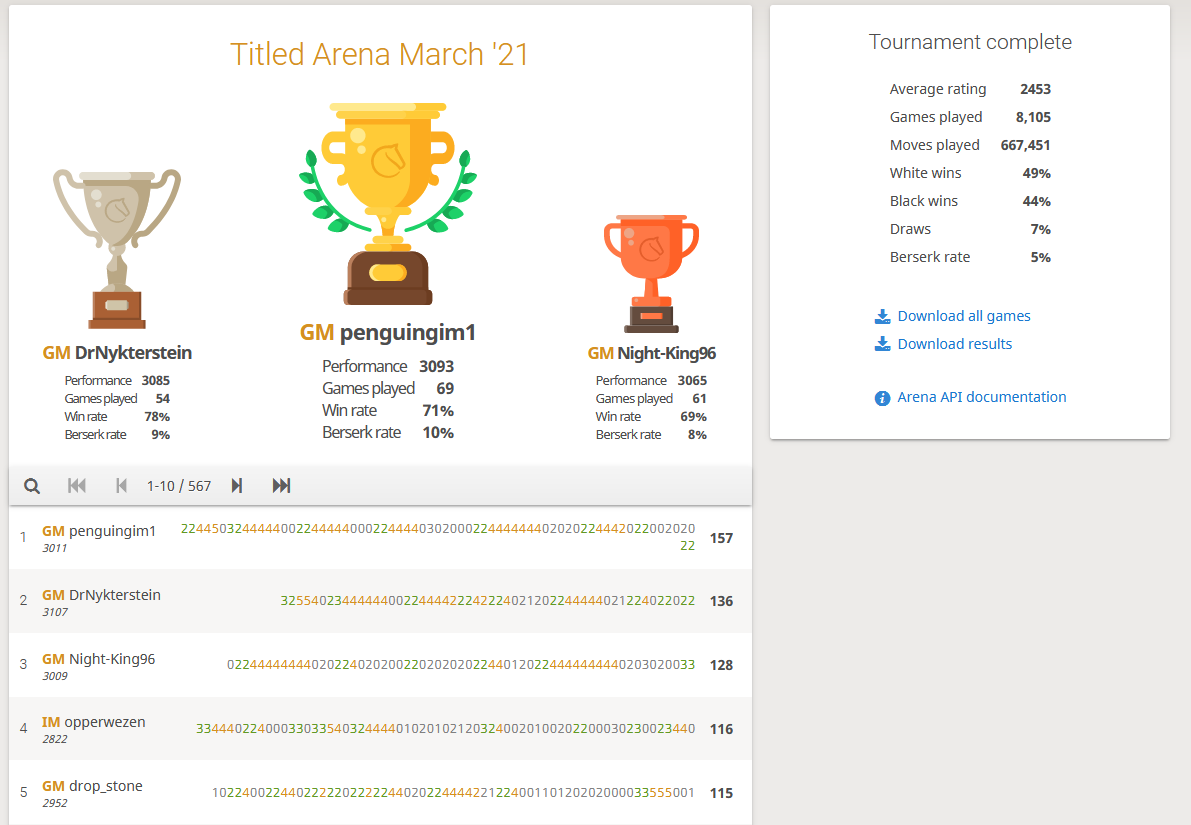
Final standings of the March 2021 Titled Arena

In December 2017 Lichess began hosting a monthly Lichess Titled Arena with cash prizes for titled players, featuring some of the best players in the world playing bullet chess. Magnus Carlsen won the first titled arena, and has regularly competed and won events since then. Later editions have featured blitz chess as well, and some events were played as Chess 960 events with randomized starting positions for each game.

As of February 2022, Carlsen has a record 17 victories in titled arenas, followed by Alireza Firouzja with 13 victories. Other participants in past editions include Fabiano Caruana, Maxime Vachier-Lagrave, Vladimir Fedoseev, Vladislav Artemiev, Alexander Grischuk, and Anish Giri.

=== Saint Louis Chess Club ===
The Saint Louis Chess Club (SLCC) regularly hosted events on Lichess with large prize funds, attracting the world's best players to compete until Lichess terminated the relationship in 2023.

In May 2020, the SLCC hosted the Clutch Chess: USA on Lichess, a four-player knock-out event with $100,000 in prizes. The participants were Fabiano Caruana, Wesley So, Leinier Domínguez, and Hikaru Nakamura. The event was won by So, beating Caruana on tiebreaks in the final (more wins in clutch games) after a final score of 9–9.

In June 2020, the SLCC hosted the Clutch Chess: International on Lichess, an eight-player invitational knock-out tournament with a prize fund of $265,000, which at the time was the largest prize fund ever offered for an online chess event. The participants were Magnus Carlsen, Maxime Vachier-Lagrave, Leinier Domínguez, Alexander Grischuk, Levon Aronian, Fabiano Caruana, Wesley So, and Jeffery Xiong. Carlsen won the event, beating Caruana 9.5–8.5 in the finals.

In September 2020, the SLCC hosted the 2020 Champions Showdown: Chess 9LX on Lichess, a Chess 960 invitational rapid tournament with a prize fund of $150,000. The participants of this event were Magnus Carlsen, Garry Kasparov, Fabiano Caruana, Hikaru Nakamura, Wesley So, Levon Aronian, Maxime Vachier-Lagrave, Alireza Firouzja, Leinier Domínguez and Peter Svidler. The event was jointly won by Carlsen and Nakamura, both scoring 6/9.

Later in September 2020, the SLCC hosted the 2020 Saint Louis Rapid and Blitz on Lichess, a combined rapid and blitz event with a prize fund of $250,000. The ten invited participants included Carlsen, Nakamura and So. Carlsen and So were the joint overall winners with 24 points, with So winning the three-day rapid phase with 13 points, while Carlsen and Nakamura shared first in the two-day blitz phase with 12 points each.

=== Miscellaneous ===
In April 2020, Magnus Carlsen and Alireza Firouzja played a bullet match on Lichess, with the winner of the overall match being the first player to reach 100 wins. After 194 games Firouzja won the match 103.5–90.5 (100 wins, 7 draws and 87 losses).

In May 2020, Lichess hosted the Play for Russia charity event, to raise money for hospitals and health workers fighting the COVID-19 pandemic. The event raised 24,670,000 roubles ($335,000) and was won by Alexander Grischuk, beating Evgeny Tomashevsky in the finals. Other participants included Vladimir Kramnik, Ian Nepomniachtchi, Sergey Karjakin, and Peter Svidler.

In the same month, several chess players (including Sebastien Feller) hosted a charity event on Lichess to raise money for the Mercy hospital in Metz, France, in the fight against COVID-19.

In August 2020, the Qatar Chess Federation hosted the Katara International Bullet Tournament on Lichess, with a prize fund of $10,000. The event was won by Magnus Carlsen, beating Daniel Naroditsky in the finals. The 2021 edition with a prize fund of $12,800 was won by Vladislav Artemiev; in the finals, he beat Andrew Tang, who had knocked out Magnus Carlsen in the semifinals.

=== Lichess 4545 League ===
The 4545 Lichess League is an online chess competition established in 2015 in collaboration with Lichess. Running for 47 seasons, the league focuses on classical time control play, mostly G/45+45, and features team-based tournaments, including the Lonewolf League, which is designed for individual players. The 4545 Lichess League aims to promote competitive play and community engagement among chess enthusiasts worldwide.

== Features ==
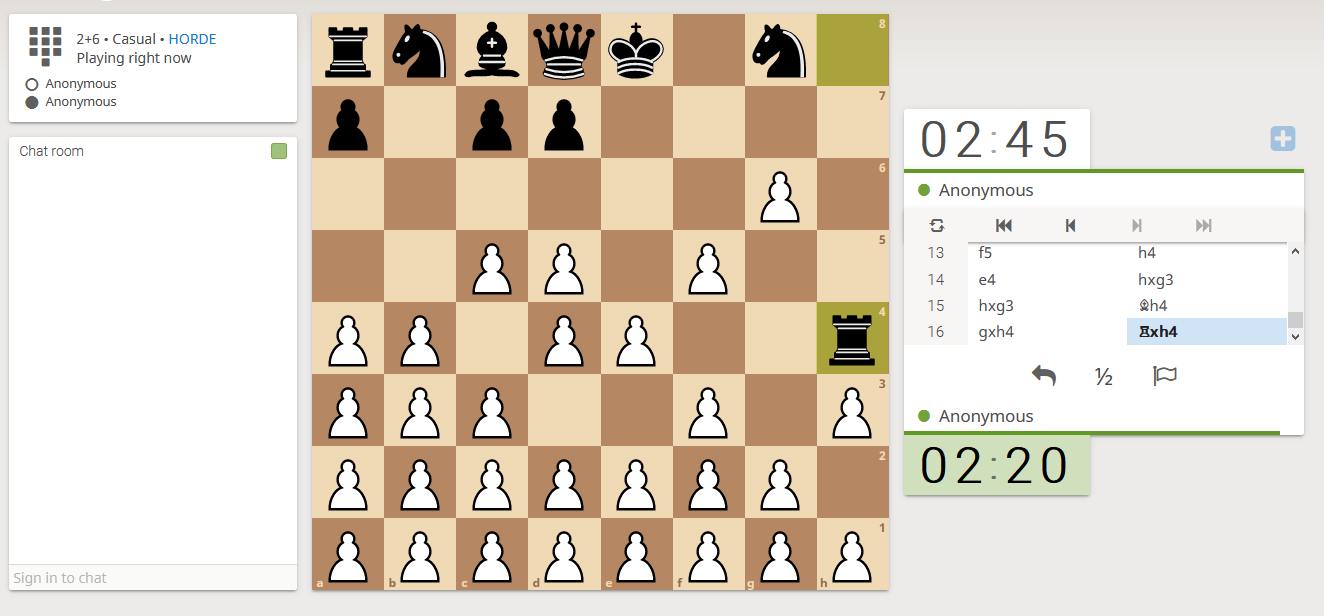
In "Horde", white has a large number of pawns and black has a normal setup. For White to win, they must checkmate Black. For Black to win, they must capture all White pieces and pawns.

=== Gameplay, ratings and variants ===
The website allows users to play games of live and correspondence chess against other players at different time controls. It has training features, including chess basics, tactics training, chess coordinates, a chess video library, an opening explorer, studies, and an analysis board. It also has a section where chess coaches can advertise their services to users. Users can create "arena" or "swiss"-style tournaments in any time control and variant, including custom starting positions (for example, a thematic blitz tournament from the starting position of the King's Gambit). Users can also create simultaneous exhibitions in which they play against multiple other users at the same time.

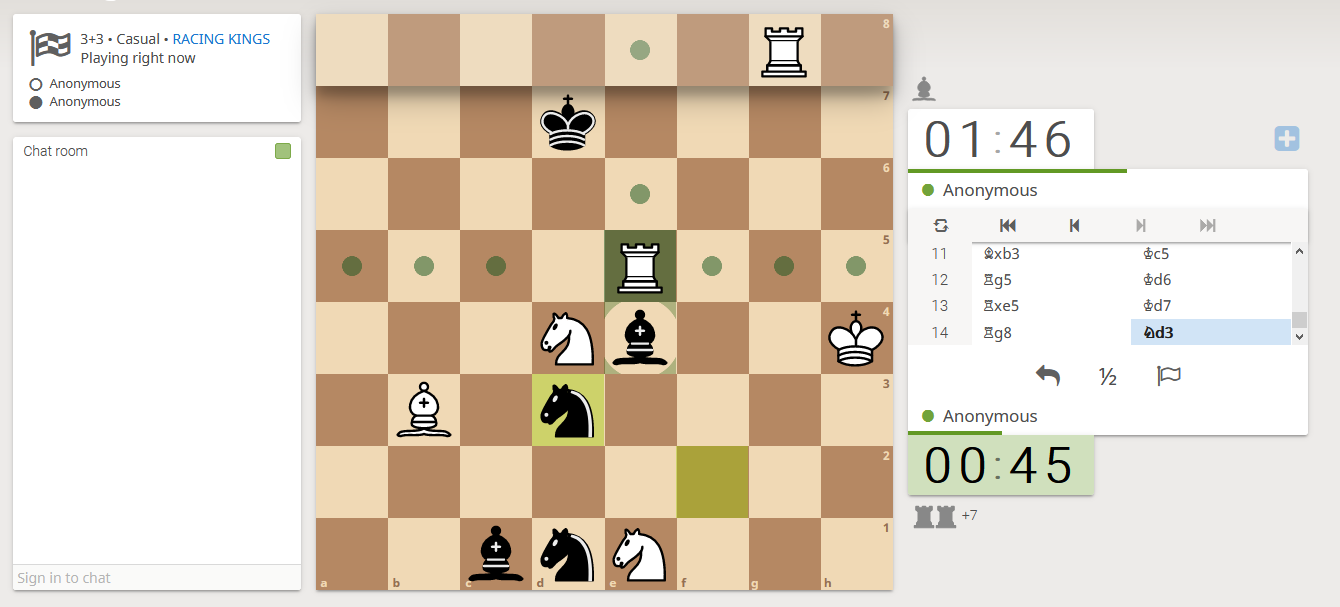
In "Racing Kings", the first player whose king reaches the eighth rank wins. Players are not allowed to put their opponent in check.

In addition to enabling blindfold chess, the website supports the following chess variants:

- Antichess
- Atomic chess
- Chess960 (Fischer Random Chess)
- Crazyhouse
- Horde (a variant of Dunsany's chess)
- King of the Hill
- Racing Kings
- Three-check chess

It also has a mode that enables one to play from a set position, whether entered manually or from another game.

Lichess was the first chess-site to have features to help visually impaired people play chess on a website. It also has a chess puzzle-based CAPTCHA system.

For registered players, Lichess employs a Glicko-2 rating system, and grants the ability to compete in tournaments, post in the forums, and request a server-side full game analysis for any finalized game. The ratings for standard chess are categorized into Ultrabullet, Bullet, Blitz, Rapid, Classical, or Correspondence depending on the game's total time or estimated total time (if using Fischer time control which increments time after each move).

Number of games played in each time control (as of May 2024)
Time Control	Number of games
UltraBullet	71,435,637
Bullet	1,959,607,944
Blitz	2,702,090,327
Rapid	822,375,290
Classical	69,773,068
Correspondence	9,509,939
Total	5,634,792,205

A Lichess mobile app is available for iOS and Android.

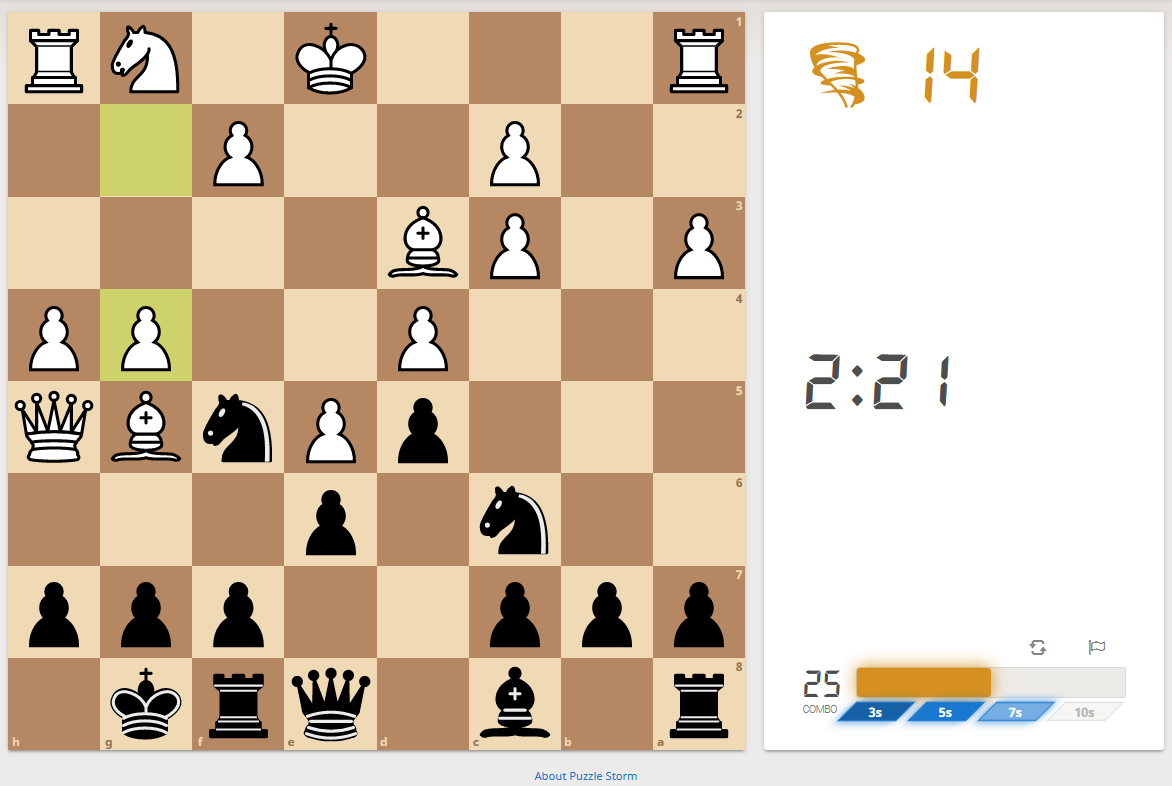
Puzzle Storm design

Games are stored in a database and are available to download which has served as the basis for multiple academic papers.

=== Training and analysis ===
Users can play games against the Stockfish chess engine at a number of difficulty levels. They may analyze specific positions from standard chess or any of the supported chess variants. The website implements a version of the Stockfish engine that runs on the user's local machine within the user's web browser for limited or infinite analysis, which will calculate best lines of play or major opponent threats. An opening book based on games played on the site or a database of two million games played by FIDE titled players is available. In the Antichess analysis board, users can utilize Mark Watkins's antichess solution database.

==== Puzzles ====
On March 19, 2021, Lichess announced a new feature – Puzzle Racer, a mix of Puzzle Storm, released in January of the same year. Like Puzzle Storm, a timed puzzle feature, it prompts the user to solve chess puzzles with increasing difficulty as quickly as possible, but with the goal to outperform opponents in both the time and accuracy sense and hence be the first to finish the race. Each correct move, not puzzle, gives a user one point and fills the combo bar by one. When a bar is filled a point bonus is given as shown below.

- 5 moves: +1 point
- 12 moves: +2 points
- 20 moves: +3 points
- 30 moves: +4 points
- Then +4 points every 10 other moves.

As with puzzle storm, an official leaderboard is not yet implemented, however, players can see their daily high scores. There are no bots participating but unregistered players can also join and are given their user names randomly.

== Gallery ==
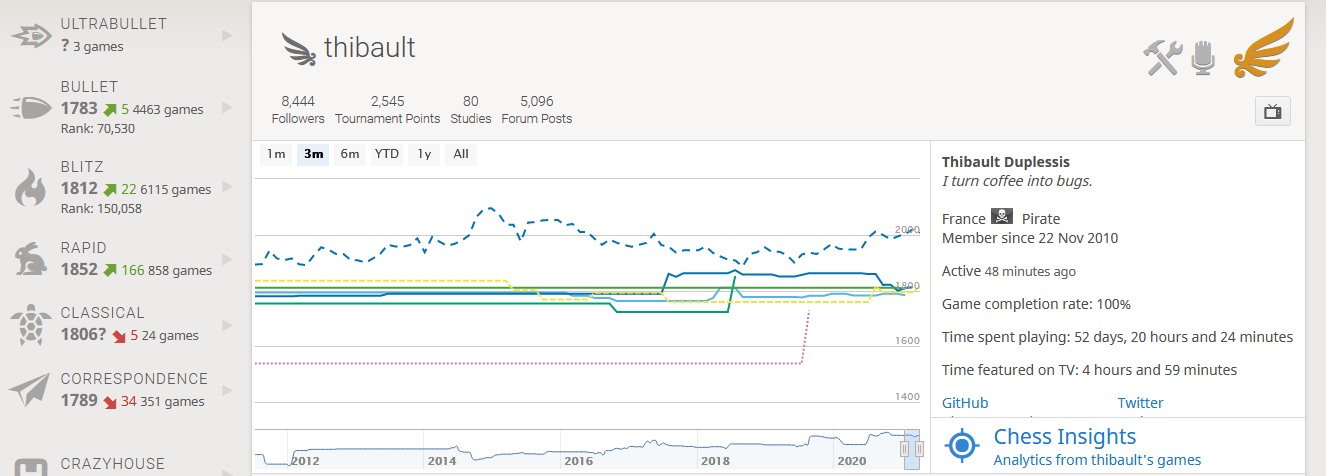
Example profile

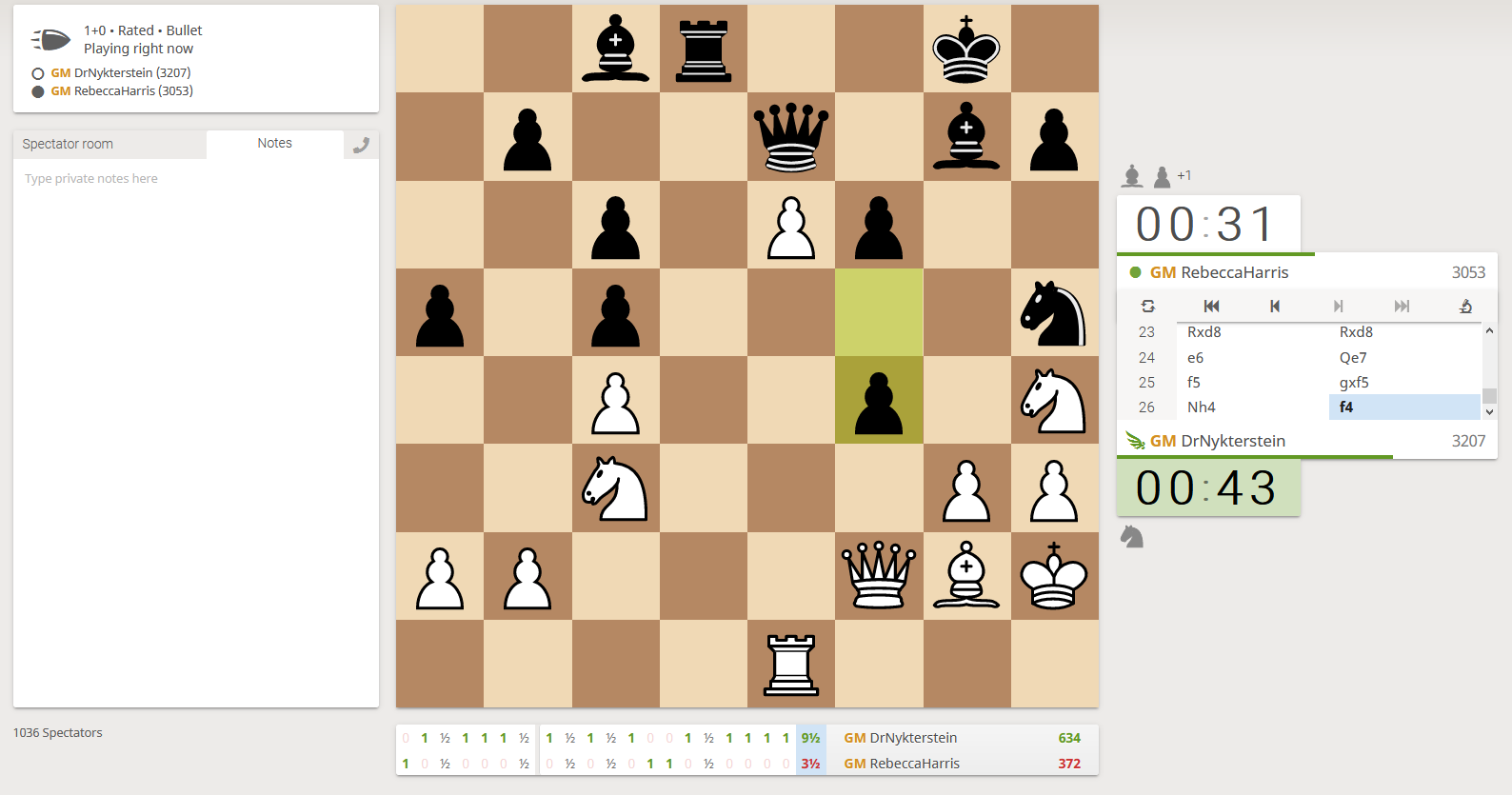
A bullet chess game in progress

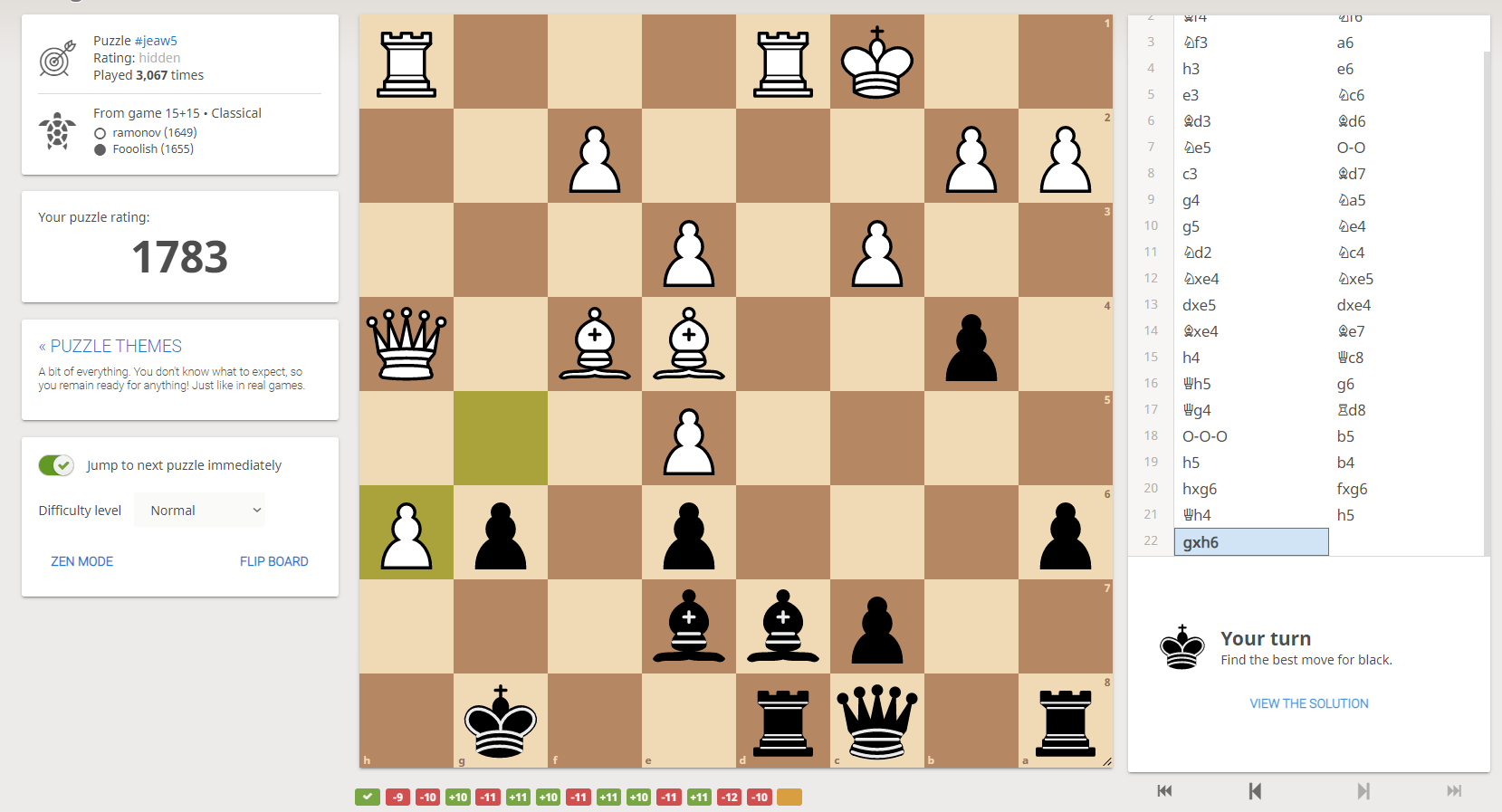
A chess puzzle

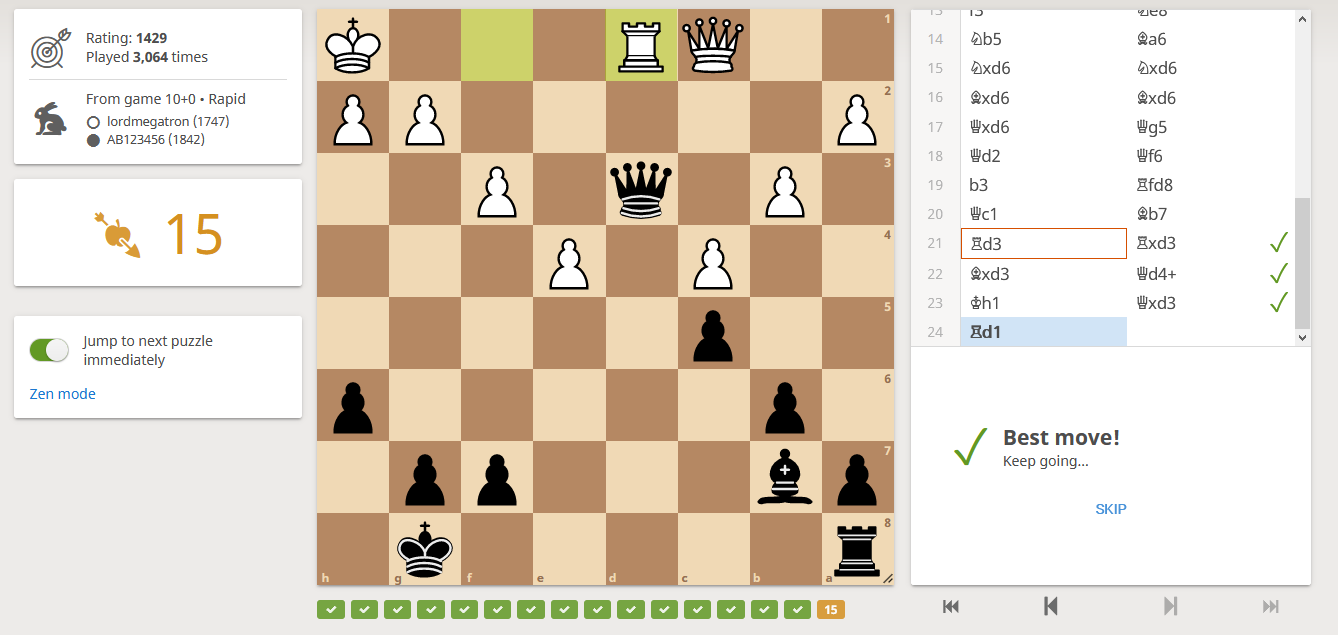
Puzzle Streak, where players solve increasingly difficult chess puzzles until a mistake is made

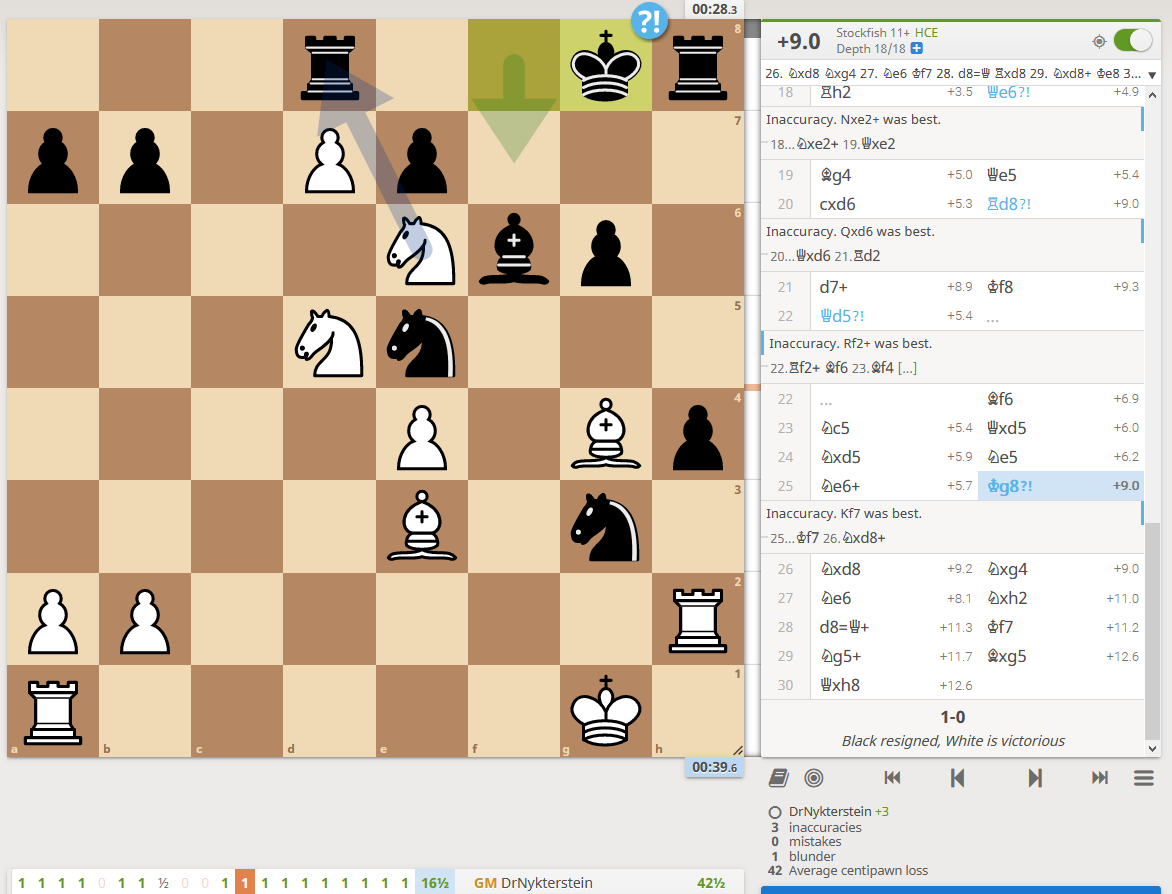
Post-game analysis with Stockfish

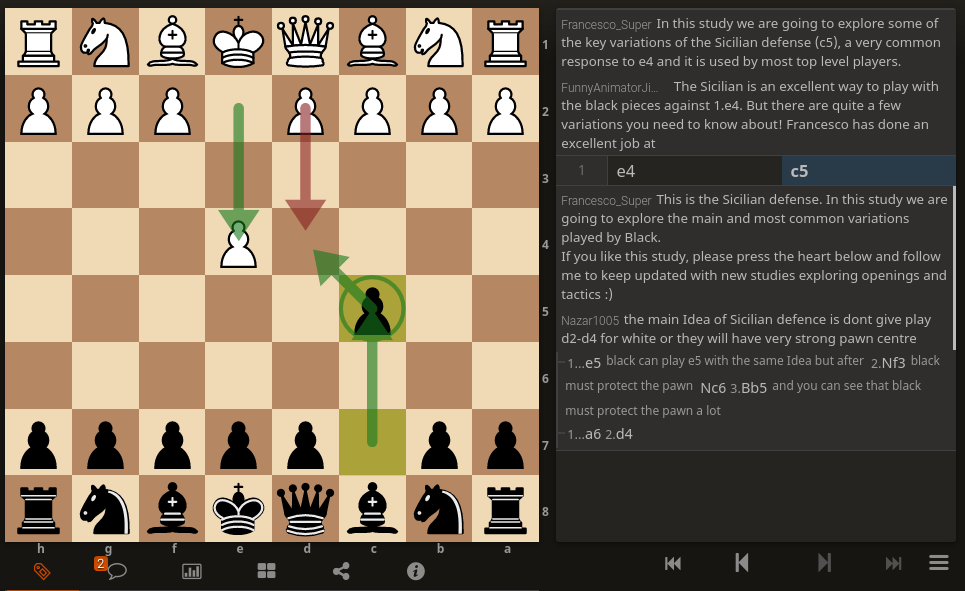
A study for the Sicilian Defence

== External Relations and Partnerships ==
=== Boycott of US Chess Federation and Saint Louis Chess Club ===
In August 2023, an article was published on the Lichess website, stating "Lichess will no longer cooperate with the US Chess Federation and the Saint Louis Chess Club". The article included previously unpublished details of sexual misconduct allegations against two US grandmasters, and criticized the handling of it by both organizations. In June 2025, Lichess announced via a blog post that it "has resumed cooperation with Saint Louis Chess Club after positive changes, but will maintain its boycott on the US Chess Federation". In October 2026, Lichess announced the end of the boycott due to positive changes made by the new US Chess leaders.

=== Cooperation with Take Take Take ===
In April 2026, Lichess announced its official cooperation with Take Take Take, a chess platform co-founded by Magnus Carlsen. Take Take Take agreed to use Lichess as the infrastructure for their new play zone in exchange for financial support to Lichess along with contribution to open source develpoment.

Lichess noted that their team initially considered the proposal with caution, as they have been approached by companies that don't understand their values. However, after careful scrutiny and Take Take Take's agreement to adhere to the philosophy of Lichess, the team agreed to collaborate. Lichess believes that this cooperation will be beneficial for the chess community as a whole. Allowing healthy competition between chess companies and facilitating the demonopolization of chess.

The response from the community was positive, yet some members of the community were still concerned whether Lichess would diverge from their values due to corporate influence. Lichess assured the community that their values are non-negotiable and Take Take Take will have no influence over the workings of Lichess.

== See also ==
- Glossary of chess
- List of Internet chess platforms
- Outline of chess
