= Online chess =

Chess played over the Internet

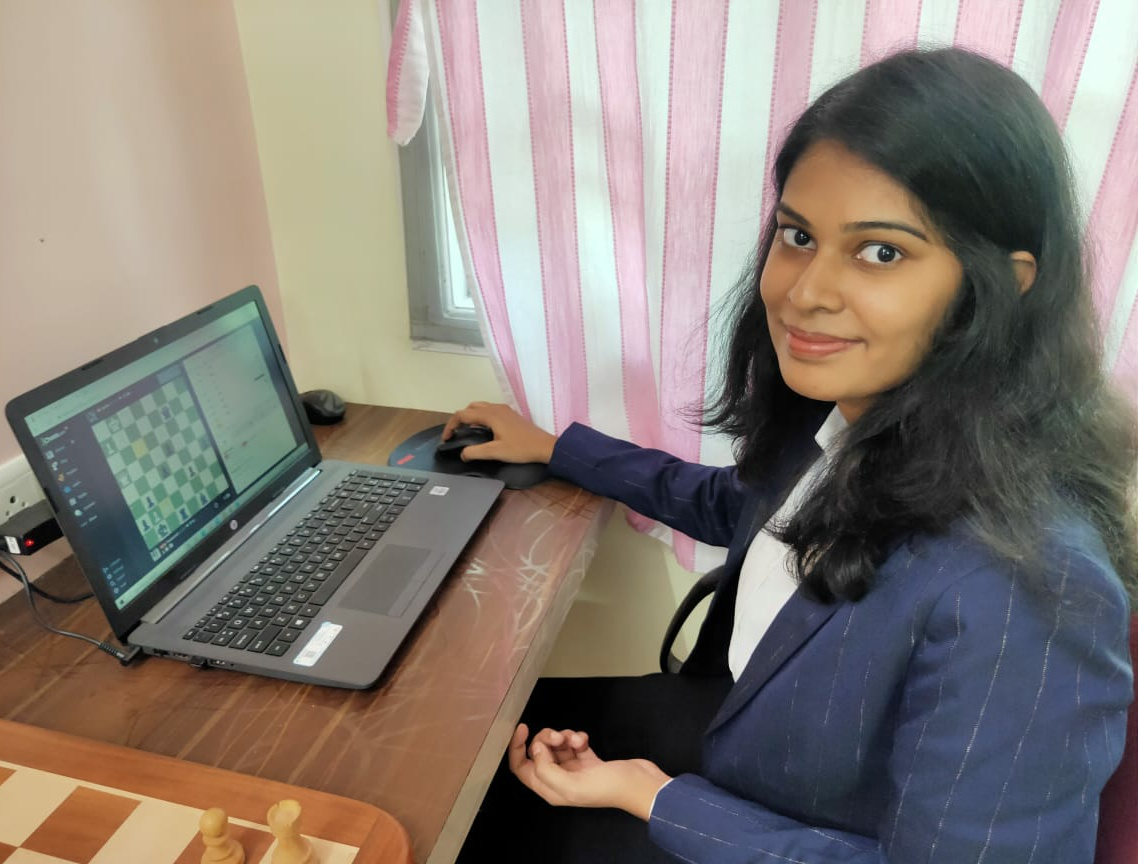
P. V. Nandhidhaa playing online chess on Chess.com

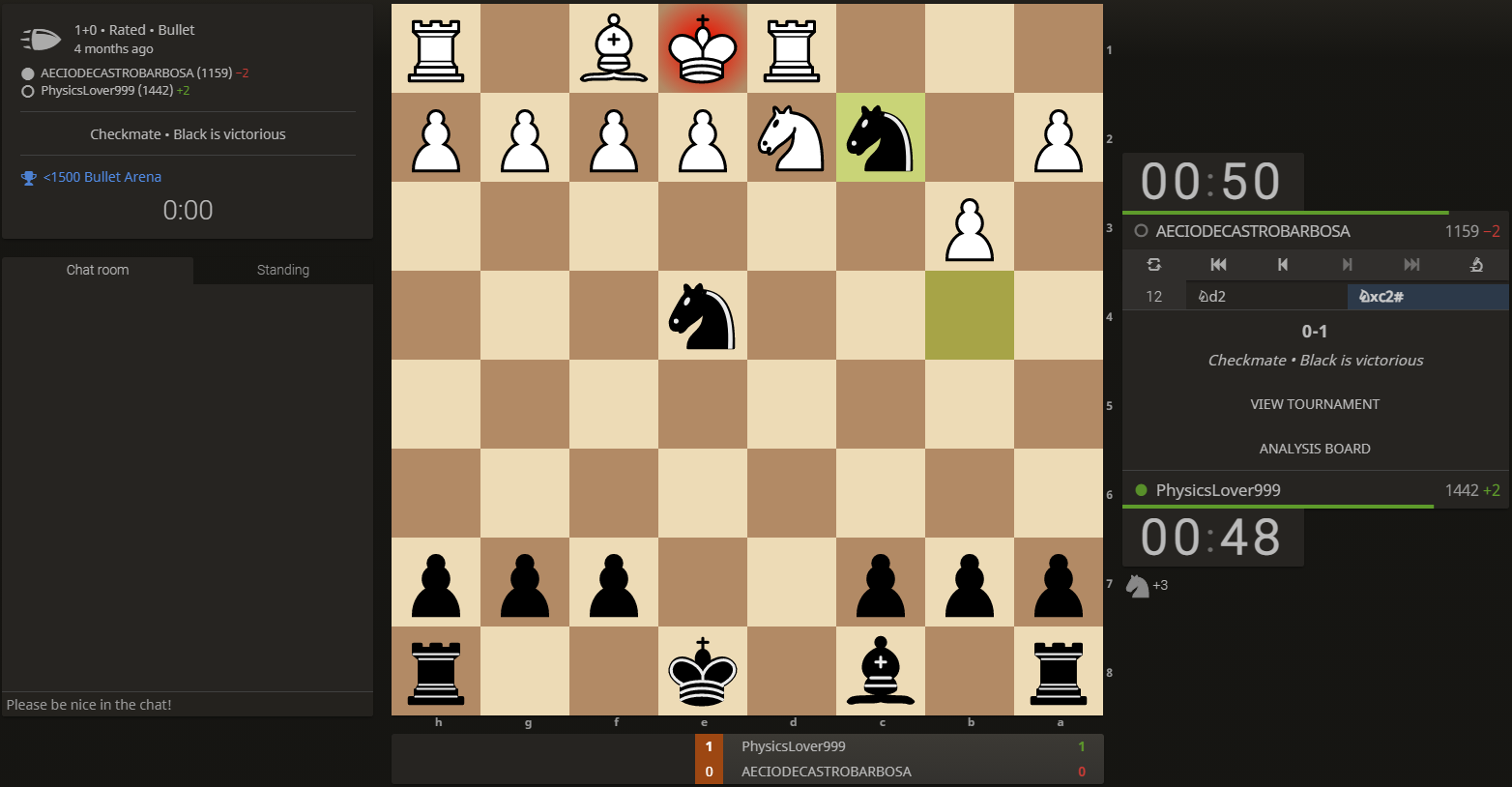
A chess game on Lichess that ended in a smothered mate

Online chess is chess that is played over the Internet, allowing players to play against each other. This was first done asynchronously through PLATO and email in the 1970s. In 1992, the Internet Chess Server facilitated live online play via telnet, and inspired several other telnet-based systems around the world. Web-based platforms became popular in the 2010s and grew considerably amid the COVID-19 pandemic, alongside a trend of livestreaming chess.

== History ==
=== Asynchronous ===
Online chess has existed in various forms including PLATO and play-by-email since the dawn of the Internet in the 1970s.

=== Chess servers ===
Internet chess servers were the first way to play live chess against a human opponent via the internet. In 1992, Michael Moore and Richard Nash developed the American Internet Chess Server (ICS), which allowed users to connect via telnet. Graphical interfaces were developed to improve upon the text-only experience. In 1994, developer Daniel Sleator, who improved the server's code to address several bugs, copyrighted it and commercialized the server as the Internet Chess Club. Frustrated former users and developers began improving the older code to launch the Free Internet Chess Server.

=== Websites ===
The first chess website which allowed playing through a graphical interface, was Caissa.com (known at the time as Caissa's Web) which launched in 1995. Since then, a number of chess websites have been developed. These include Chess.com, Lichess, and chess24, (acquired by Chess.com and later shut down).

==== Growth ====
Online chess saw a spike in growth during the quarantines of the COVID-19 pandemic. This was due to both isolation and the popularity of Netflix miniseries The Queen's Gambit, which was released in October 2020. Chess app downloads on the App Store and Google Play Store rose by 63% after the show debuted. Chess.com saw more than twice as many account registrations in November as it had in previous months, and the number of games played monthly on Lichess doubled as well. There was also a demographic shift in players, with female registration on Chess.com shifting from 22% of new players to 27% of new players. Grandmaster Maurice Ashley said "A boom is taking place in chess like we have never seen maybe since the Bobby Fischer days," attributing the growth to an increased desire to do something constructive during the pandemic. USCF Women's Program Director Jennifer Shahade stated that chess works well on the Internet, since pieces do not need to be reset and matchmaking is virtually instant. In 2023, Youtube revealed that the game of online chess had amassed over 4 billion views during the calendar year.

=== Streaming ===
Online chess livestreaming also saw a surge amidst the pandemic. Players like Hikaru Nakamura, Daniel Naroditsky, and Levy Rozman along with many others streamed chess via Twitch, with more than 41 million hours of chess being watched total on the platform from March to August 2020. Chess.com teamed up with high-level chess streamers to organize PogChamps, an amateur tournament contested between popular Internet personalities that was streamed on Twitch and at one point became the top-viewed stream on the platform.

== Operation ==
=== Rating system ===
Chess websites pair players based on a chess rating system; after a game ends, ratings are updated immediately and players may search for a new game using their updated ratings. The Internet Chess Club uses the Elo rating system, while Chess.com uses the Glicko rating system and Lichess the Glicko-2 rating system, which are modern and more complex versions of Elo.

=== Speed ===
Over-the-board (OTB) chess is traditionally played with a slow time control, meaning players are allowed more time to consider moves. Online chess is often played faster, with 93.8% of live chess games on Chess.com being played with a time control of 10 minutes per side or faster. International Master Anna Rudolf said that "online chess' shift to speed chess has brought excitement to the game."

=== Premove ===
A premove is an instruction given by a player to a chess program to make a certain move on a following turn if possible. Premoving is a feature exclusive to online chess. It is offered by many chess websites, including the Internet Chess Club, the Free Internet Chess Server, Chess.com, and Lichess. Chess.com allows players to make multiple premoves at once. The Internet Chess Club allows one to block players who use premoves.

== Cheating ==
Online cheating is an issue that has had a large effect on all levels of play. This is usually achieved by using a chess engine to get the best moves in a given position, though it can take other forms including sandbagging and rating manipulation. Chess.com stated in August 2020 that they were closing roughly 500 accounts each day due to cheating, some of whom were Grandmasters and titled players.

High-level chess tournaments were largely forced online during the COVID-19 pandemic, including the FIDE Online Nations Cup and the Magnus Carlsen Chess Tour 2020. These were played on websites like Chess.com and chess24, but enforced additional rules on webcam usage and screen sharing in order to prevent cheating. Some tournaments also disallowed leaving the computer for breaks or to walk around, which would usually be allowed in an in-person tournament.

== See also ==
- List of Internet chess platforms
- Internet Chess Server
- Computer chess
- PyChess
- Correspondence chess
