= Internet Chess Club =

Internet chess server

- Website type: Chess server
- Available in: English
- Owners: Internet Chess Club, Inc.
- Website: www.chessclub.com
- Commercial: Yes
- Launched: 1 March 1995; 31 years ago
- Current status: Online

The Internet Chess Club (ICC) is a commercial internet chess server devoted to the play and discussion of chess and chess variants. ICC had over 30,000 subscribing members in 2005, making it the largest pay to play server at the time.

== History ==
The first online chess platform, Internet Chess Server (ICS), programmed by Michael Moore and Richard Nash, was launched on 15 January 1992. Players logged in by telnet, and the board was displayed as ASCII text. Early bugs in the server software allowed illegal moves, false checkmates etc. Over time, features were added like Elo ratings and a choice of graphical interfaces. The playing pool grew steadily, many of the server bugs were fixed, and players began to have higher expectations for stability.

Later on in 1992, Daniel Sleator (username darooha) volunteered to take over as head programmer, and began a large overhaul of the server code. He addressed, among other issues, the frequent complaint that players would lose blitz games on time due to Internet lag. In 1994, he copyrighted the code, and began receiving purchase offers from companies wanting to commercialize the server. On 1 March 1995, Sleator announced his intentions to commercialize ICS, renaming it the Internet Chess Club (ICC) and charging a yearly membership fee. The fee was waived for players with a Grandmaster or International Master title.

On 29 May 2007, the ICC bought the World Chess Network, which was then merged with Chess Live, another chess server acquired from GamesParlor. The result of the acquisition and merger was the formation of World Chess Live, a new Internet chess server that merged features of both services. World Chess Live subsequently merged back into the Internet Chess Club on 19 March 2012. For some years, the Spanish on-line chess portal JaqueMate.org had technological support provided by ICC. The portal closed on 30 April 2013 with members transferred to ICC.

== Services available ==
ICC's core service is the facility to play chess games (and a number of chess variants) against other members and computers coupled with a rating system. ICC also offers many different types of tournaments. ICC recently partnered with the United States Chess Federation (USCF) to provide USCF rated online quick and blitz tournaments (these online ratings are separate from the USCF over-the-board quick and blitz rating systems apart from the initial seeding of the online quick and blitz ratings for unrated players). Members can also watch live broadcasts of tournaments with grandmaster commentary on Chess.FM, watch games involving titled players being played on ICC and challenge grandmasters in simultaneous exhibitions. The site also offers access to libraries of games, recorded lectures and private lessons (at additional cost).

== Criticism ==
The commercialization of ICS was extensively criticized by users, particularly that Daniel Sleator was charging a subscription to use a system that had been developed by others. Following complaints by students, they were offered a 50% discount. Programmers who had worked on the original ICS, led by Chris Petroff, felt their work was exploited and formed the Free Internet Chess Server (FICS), which to this day continues to allow everyone to access all features for free.

The security of the system was criticized in December 2005 with claims that communications between ICC and users could easily be read and that the timestamping could be defeated.

== See also ==
- List of Internet chess servers
