= Hexagonal chess =

Set of chess variants played on a board with hexagonal cells

Gliński's hexagonal chess, launched in 1949, became popular in Eastern Europe, reaching half a million fans. Three cell colours and three bishops per side are the norm for hexagonal variants.

Hexagonal chess is a group of chess variants played on boards composed of hexagon cells. The best known is Gliński's variant, played on a symmetric 91-cell hexagonal board.

Since each hexagonal cell not on a board edge has six neighbor cells, there is generally increased mobility for pieces (that cannot move diagonally) compared to a standard orthogonal chessboard. For example, a rook on a hexboard usually has six natural directions for movement instead of four in the standard 8×8 board. Three colours are typically used on a hexboard so that no two neighboring cells are the same colour, and a colour-restricted game piece such as the orthodox chess bishop usually comes in sets of three per player in order to maintain the game's balance.

Many different shapes and sizes of hexagon-based boards are used as variants. The nature of the game is also affected by the 30° orientation of the board's cells; the board can be horizontally oriented (Wellisch's, de Vasa's, Brusky's) or vertically oriented (Gliński's, Shafran's, McCooey's). When the sides of hexagonal cells face the players, pawns typically have one straightforward move direction. If a variant's gameboard has cell vertices facing the players, pawns typically have two oblique-forward move directions. The possibility of a hexagon-based board with three-fold rotational symmetry has also resulted in a number of three-player variants.

Because the six edges and six vertices of regular hexagons are equally spaced, directions can be referenced analogously to the 12 cardinal directions of a clock face. For example, on a board made of horizontally aligned hexagons, the forward and backward directions can be referred to as the "12 o'clock" and "6 o'clock" directions.

The first applications of chess on hexagonal boards probably occurred mid-19th century, but two early examples did not include checkmate as the winning objective. More chess-like games for hexagon-based boards started appearing regularly at the beginning of the 20th century. Hexagon-celled gameboards have grown in use for strategy games generally; for example, they are popularly used in modern wargaming.

== Gliński's hexagonal chess ==
Gliński's hexagonal chess, invented by Władysław Gliński in 1936 and first launched in Britain in 1949, is "probably the most widely played of the hexagonal chess games". The game was popular in Eastern Europe, especially in Gliński's native Poland. At one point there were more than half a million players, and more than 130,000 board sets were sold. Gliński's book Rules of Hexagonal Chess was published in 1973.

=== Rules ===
The rules are the same as those of orthodox chess except as follows:

The game is played on a vertically oriented regular hexagonal board with sides 6 cells long, which has 91 hex cells having three colours (light, dark, and mid-tone), with the middle cell (or "hex") usually mid-tone. The usual set of chess pieces is increased by one bishop and one pawn. The board has 11 files, marked by letters a–l (letter j is not used), and 11 numbered ranks (which bend 60° at file f). Ranks 1–6 each contain 11 cells, rank 7 (filled with black pawns in the initial setup) has 9 cells, rank 8 has 7, and so on. Rank 11 contains exactly one cell: f11.

Rook moves

King moves

Bishop moves

Knight moves

Queen moves

Pawn moves, captures (marked with crosses), promotion cells for White (marked with stars)

The moves of the pieces are as follows:

- The rook may move any number of cells orthogonally (i.e. through cell edges).
- The bishop may move any number of cells diagonally (i.e. through cell vertices).
- The queen may move any number of cells orthogonally or diagonally.
- The king may move one cell orthogonally or diagonally. There is no castling.
- The knight may move two cells orthogonally in one direction and then one cell orthogonally at a 60° angle, jumping over intervening pieces. Equivalently, the knight may move to any nearest cell not on an orthogonal or diagonal line on which it stands.
- The pawn may move one vacant cell vertically forward. If it stands on its starting cell or on the starting cell of any other pawn of its colour, then it is also allowed to move two vacant cells vertically forward. It may capture one cell orthogonally forward at a 60° angle to the vertical, including capturing en passant. It is promoted when it reaches the end of any file.

In the pawn diagram, if the pawn on e4 were to capture a black piece on f5, then the pawn would retain the option to move to f7. If the black pawn on c7 in the diagram moves to c5 in a single move, the white pawn on b5 can capture it en passant: bxc6.

Stalemate is not a draw in Gliński's chess, but it is still counted as less than checkmate: in tournament games, the player who delivers stalemate earns 3/4 point, and the stalemated player (the player without a legal move) receives 1/4 point.

A numeric (or international) notation exists. Every detail is exactly as in ICCF numeric notation except that there is no castling.

=== Observations ===
Unlike in orthodox chess, a king and two knights can mate a king. A knight can triangulate. A player's three bishops, confined to different colours, can never defend each other. In the initial setup, the white pawn on f5 cannot make a double step to f7, which is occupied by a black pawn; however, the double-step move could be possible later if f7 becomes empty.

There is a Fool's mate consisting of the following moves in algebraic notation: 1.Qe1c3 Qe10c6 2.b1b2 b7b6 3.Bf3b1 e7e6? 4.Qc3xBf9#.

=== Timeline ===
- 1976. June: First Hexagonal Chess Congress at Bloomsbury Centre Hotel, London, which included the inauguration of the British Hexagonal Chess Federation and the first British Hexagonal Chess Championship. David Springgay took the title. (Deceased 12 February 2018) December: First issue of "Hex Press" (Hexagonal Chess News) published.
- 1977. September: First British Under 16 Championship held at Games Workshop, Compton Street, London won by John Hockaday. This was the only time the Championship took place for this age group.
- 1977. Hexagonal Chess was topic for many newspapers and magazines in Poland and other Eastern European countries. December: Second British Championship held at Clifton-Ford Hotel, London. Brian Rippon took the title.
- 1978. January: Inventor visited Poland. Successful Hexagonal Chess event staged. Wide publicity in Eastern Europe. 'Wspolna Sprawa' produced and distributed over 90,000 inexpensive sets in 18 months. September: First International Team Match – Poland vs. Great Britain at Central Hall, Westminster, London. Event shown on BBC and Australian TV, reported in press at home and abroad, including Japan.
- 1979. July: Third British Championship held at Polish Cultural Institute, London. Title taken by Simon Triggs, nearly 16 years old. August: Return International Team Match – Poland vs. Great Britain in Warsaw. Sponsored by magazine "Horyzonty Techniki" (which includes a regular column on Hexagonal Chess). Whilst in Poland, Simon Triggs played the first mixed (6 square and 6 hexagonal boards) simultaneous display. Hexagonal Chess clubs formed in Poland, Czechoslovakia and USSR.
- 1980. August: International Congress at Polish Cultural Institute, London, which included: Inauguration of International Hexagonal Chess Federation, First European Championship, Team Match: Poland v Great Britain Countries taking part: Austria, Great Britain, Hungary and Poland. Event covered by BBC TV and newspapers at home and abroad, including USSR ("Komsomolskaya Pravda" – 10,500,000 circulation), Austria and Hungary. Also radio in USA. First four places: 1: Marek Mackowiak (Poland), 2: Laszlo Rudolf (Hungary), 3: Jan Borawski (Poland), 4: Piers Shepperson (Great Britain).
- 1981. September: First Hungarian Hexagonal Chess Championship in Szekszard. Title taken by Laszlo Sziraki. Fourth British Championship held at Woodford Bridge, Essex. Local and National press coverage, including picture in "The Times". Four players tied for first place. Final playoff arranged for October. October: Playoff held in association with the North London (square-board) Congress, when Simon Triggs retained his title.
- 1982. April: Second Hungarian Championship held in Miscolc. Laszlo Rudolf became the Hungarian Champion for 1982. June: Final agreement and arrangements completed with "Bohemia" in West Germany regarding production of a new complete Hexagonal Chess boxed game with roll-up double-sided board (hexagonal/square) and wooden pieces to be distributed in the West European market. July: An open Hexagonal Chess Tournament was held on 10 and 11 July in the famous Sokolniki Park in Moscow. Players from Moscow and elsewhere in the USSR took part in the competition. First place and the "Moscow Trophy" were taken by F. Goncharov. Second was S. Seryubin and Third V. Goltyapin. Judging from the reports received, this tournament has considerably accelerated the development and popularity of Hex Chess in the USSR. Further tournaments, including international team matches (over-the-board and correspondence) are being organized. Open International Tournament held in Pecs, Hungary, 24–31 July. This tournament was organized by the President of the Hungarian Hexagonal Chess Association, Mihaly Gelencser, and sponsored by the Zsolnay porcelain factory in Pecs, which also donated the "Zsolnay Cup" as well as other prizes of porcelain figures. The winner of the Tournament was Laszlo Rudolf (Hungary). Second place was taken by Simon Triggs (Great Britain). September: Fifth British Championship held in London. Simon Triggs (19) of Garston, Hertfordshire, won the title of British Hexagaonal Chess Champion for the third time in succession. Press Association attended and wrote lengthy background. All the "quality newspapers" took photographs. LBC Radio and BBC Radio London broadcast interviews.

== Shafran's hexagonal chess ==
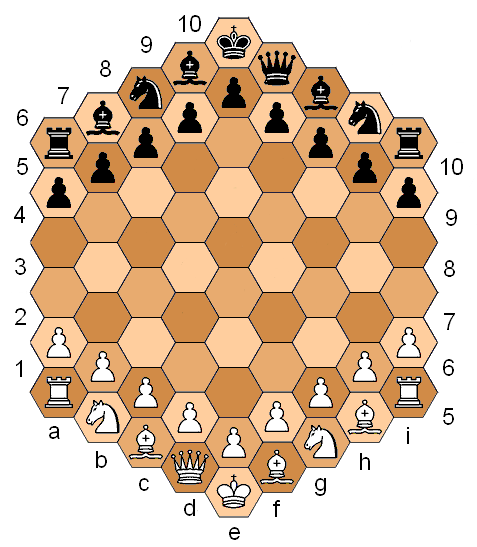
Shafran's hexagonal chess, starting position

Invented by Soviet geologist Isaak Grigorevich Shafran in 1939 and registered in 1956. It was demonstrated at the Worldwide Chess Exhibition in Leipzig in 1960.

The board is shaped as an irregular hexagon with nine files and ten ranks, comprising 70 cells as opposed to 91 in Gliński's board. The files are labelled a to i; the oblique ranks running diagonally from 10 to 4 o'clock are numbered 1 to 10. For example (see diagram), the two kings start on e1 and e10; White's rooks start on a1 and i5, and Black's rooks start on a6 and i10. Each player calls the left-hand side of the board his "queen's flank" and the right-hand side his "bishops' flank"; note that they do not correlate (White's queen's flank is Black's bishops' flank).

All pieces except pawns and kings move and capture exactly as in Gliński's chess. In Shafran's chess, a pawn's first move can take it to the middle of the file. (So, the d-, e-, and f-pawns can make a three-step initial move; the b-, c-, g-, and h-pawns can make a double-step initially; and the a- and i-pawns can advance only one step.) A pawn captures diagonally like a bishop, but one step away (one rank and one file). When a pawn makes a multi-step move, it is subject to being captured en passant.

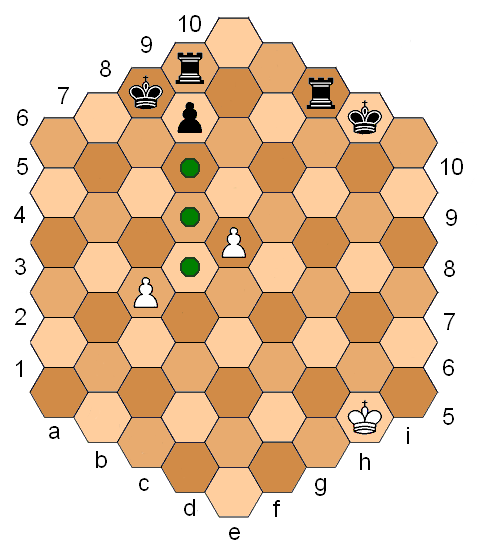
Castling and en passant capture

In the diagram, the black pawn on d8 has three possible moves, but none is safe: after 1...d7 it can be captured 2.exd7; after 1...d6 it can be captured 2.exd7 e.p. or 2.cxd6; after 1...d5 it can be captured en passant by either pawn.

Kings move as in Gliński's chess, except that castling is permitted in Shafran's chess (unlike Gliński's or McCooey's). The usual restrictions apply. It can be long or short castling in either direction. The notation consists of Q- or B- (indicating whether the queen's or the bishops' rook is used) followed by 0-0-0 (long castling: the king moves next to the rook and the rook jumps over it) or 0-0 (short castling, the king moves one cell less distance). In the diagram, the black king on h10 has castled long queenside (1...Q-0-0-0) and the black king on c8 has castled short bishopside (1...B-0-0). Castling does not typically increase the king's safety or make the rook more active, but it is present in the game nonetheless, for completeness.

Stalemate is a draw in Shafran's chess.

== De Vasa's hexagonal chess ==
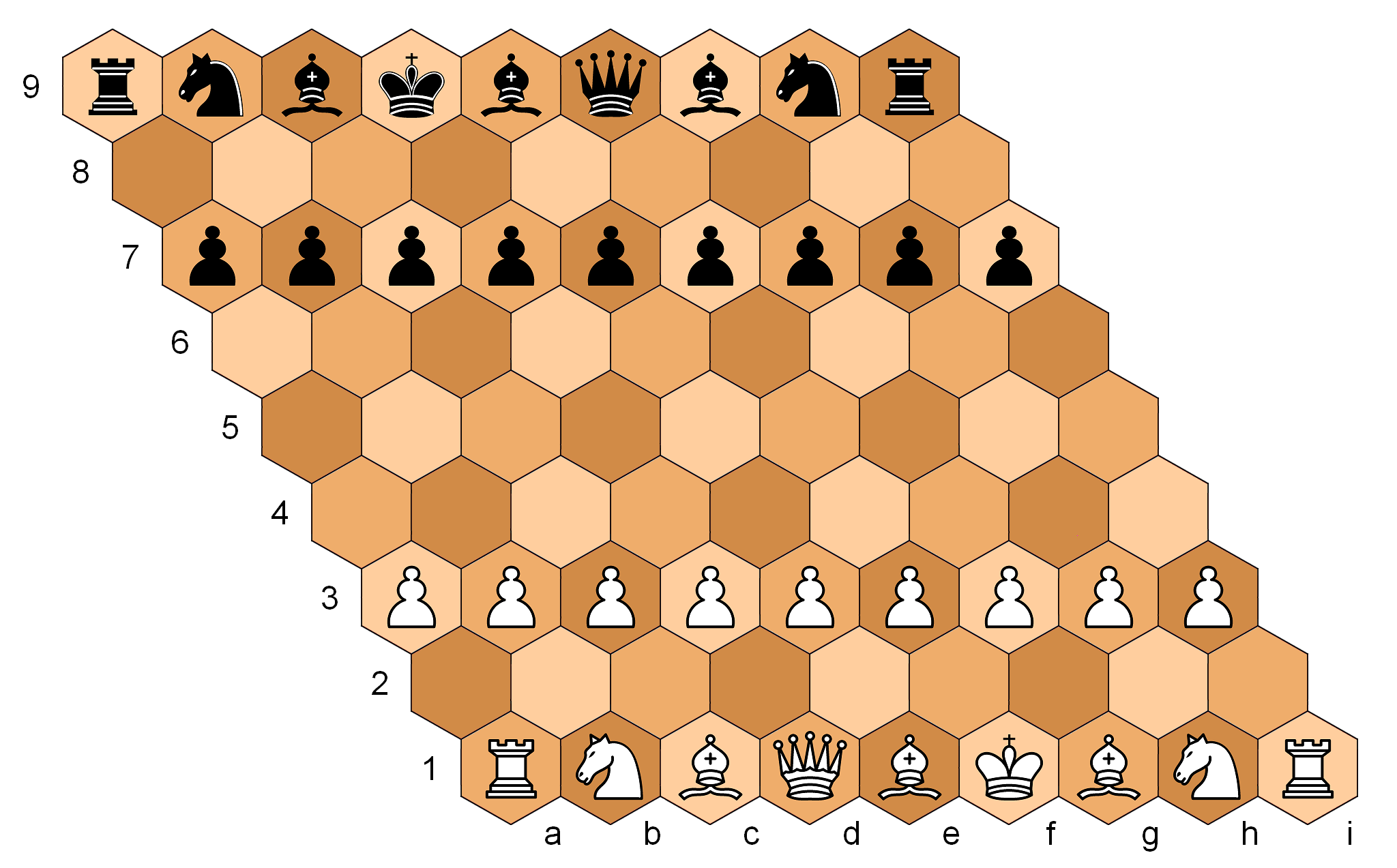
De Vasa's hexagonal chess, starting position. This array of pieces on the players' first ranks was first proposed by de Vasa.

Invented by Helge E. de Vasa in 1953 and first published in Joseph Boyer's Nouveaux Jeux d'Echecs Non-orthodoxes (Paris, 1954). The rhombus-shaped board comprises 81 cells with initial setup as shown, in the revised form of the game. Rules for piece movement are the same as Gliński's variant, except for the pawns. Castling is permitted, and kings start on opposite wings of the board.

Players may castle either short (0-0) or long (0-0-0). The king slides two cells when castling short; three cells when castling long. Other standard chess castling rules and restrictions apply.

=== Pawn's move ===
Pawns start on the players' third ranks. A pawn moves forward to an adjacent cell, or (as its first-move option), two cells forward in the same direction. A pawn captures diagonally forward to the sides (to a cell of the same colour on which the pawn stands).

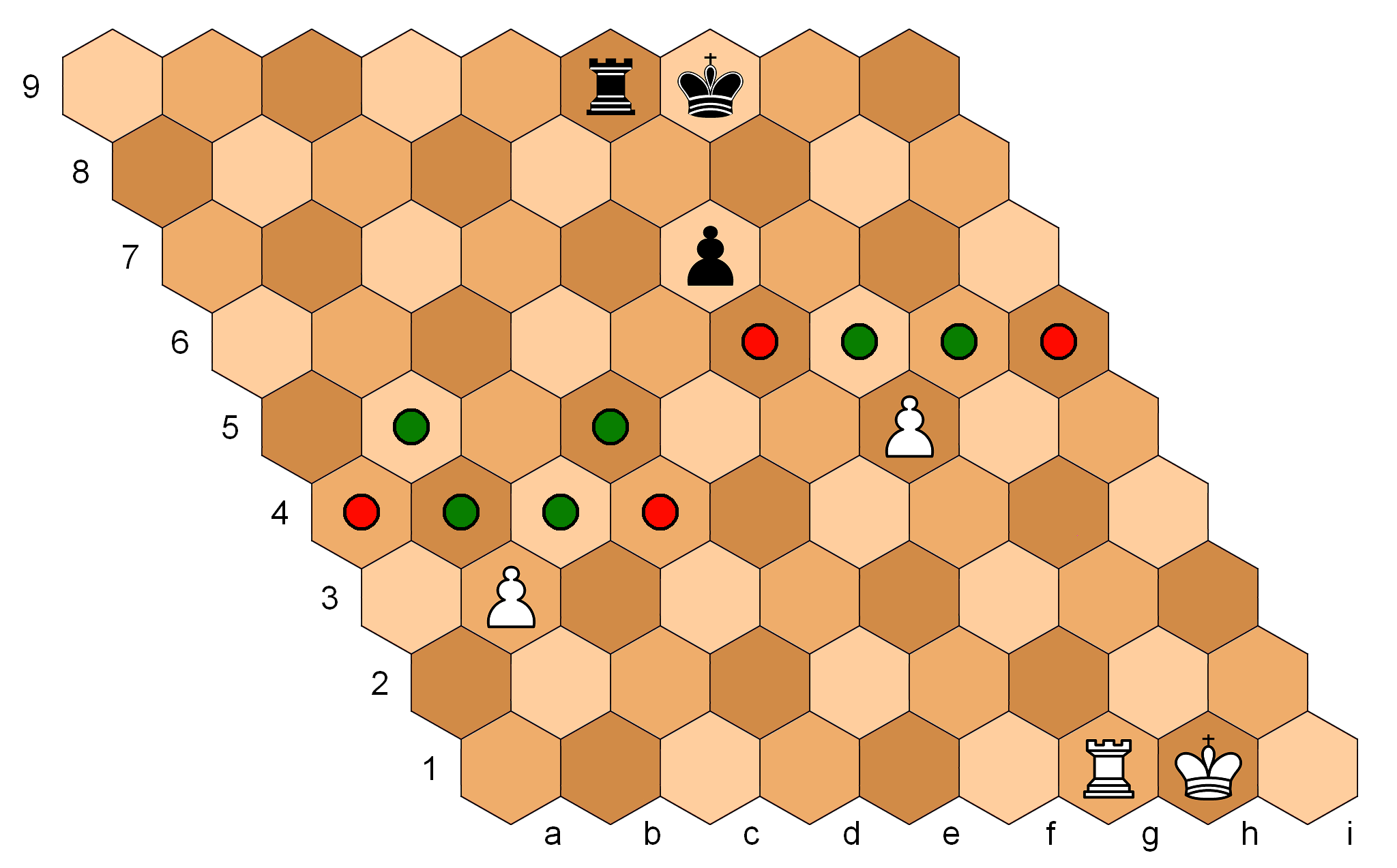
The white pawn on b3, since it has not yet moved, has four move options (green dots) and two ways to capture (red dots). The white pawn on g5 has moved from its initial cell, so has two move options and two ways to capture. If Black moves his f7-pawn to either f6 or f5, White can capture it, for example: 1...f7-f5 2.g5xf6 e.p. In the diagram, White has castled short (0-0) and Black has castled long (0-0-0).

== Brusky's hexagonal chess ==
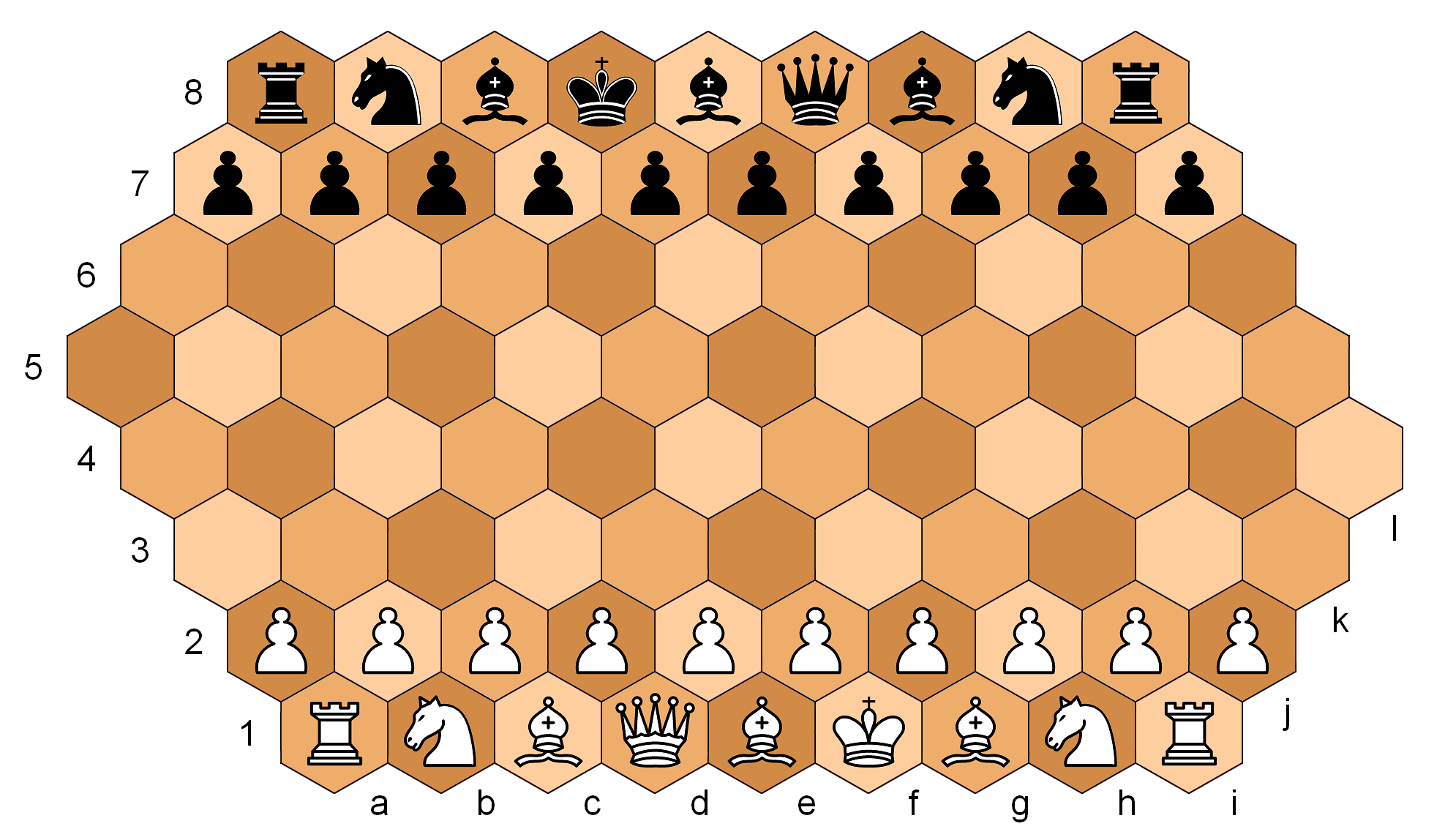
Brusky's hexagonal chess, starting position. The first-rank piece array was first proposed by Helge E. de Vasa (see De Vasa's hexagonal chess).

Invented by Yakov Brusky in 1966. The game features an irregular hexagon board comprising 84 cells. Piece movement rules are the same as Gliński's chess, except for the pawns, of which there are ten instead of Gliński's nine. Other differences from Gliński's: castling is permitted; kings start on opposite wings of the board; and draws are worth half a point.

Players may castle either short (0-0) or long (0-0-0). The king slides two cells when castling short; three cells when castling long. Normal castling rules and restrictions apply.

As in algebraic notation, each cell is identified by a letter+number combination. Ranks are horizontal and identified by numbers 1–8. Files are straight and 30° oblique to the vertical, identified by letters a–l. Moves can be recorded in long algebraic notation to avoid confusion, for example: 1.d2-f4 rather than 1.df4.

=== Pawn's move ===
A pawn moves forward to an adjacent cell, or (as its first-move option), two cells forward in the same direction. If an enemy man blocks a pawn from moving in one of its two forward move directions, then that pawn is automatically blocked from moving in the other direction as well. But if the blocking man is a friendly piece the effect is not the same—the pawn is still free to move in the unblocked direction.

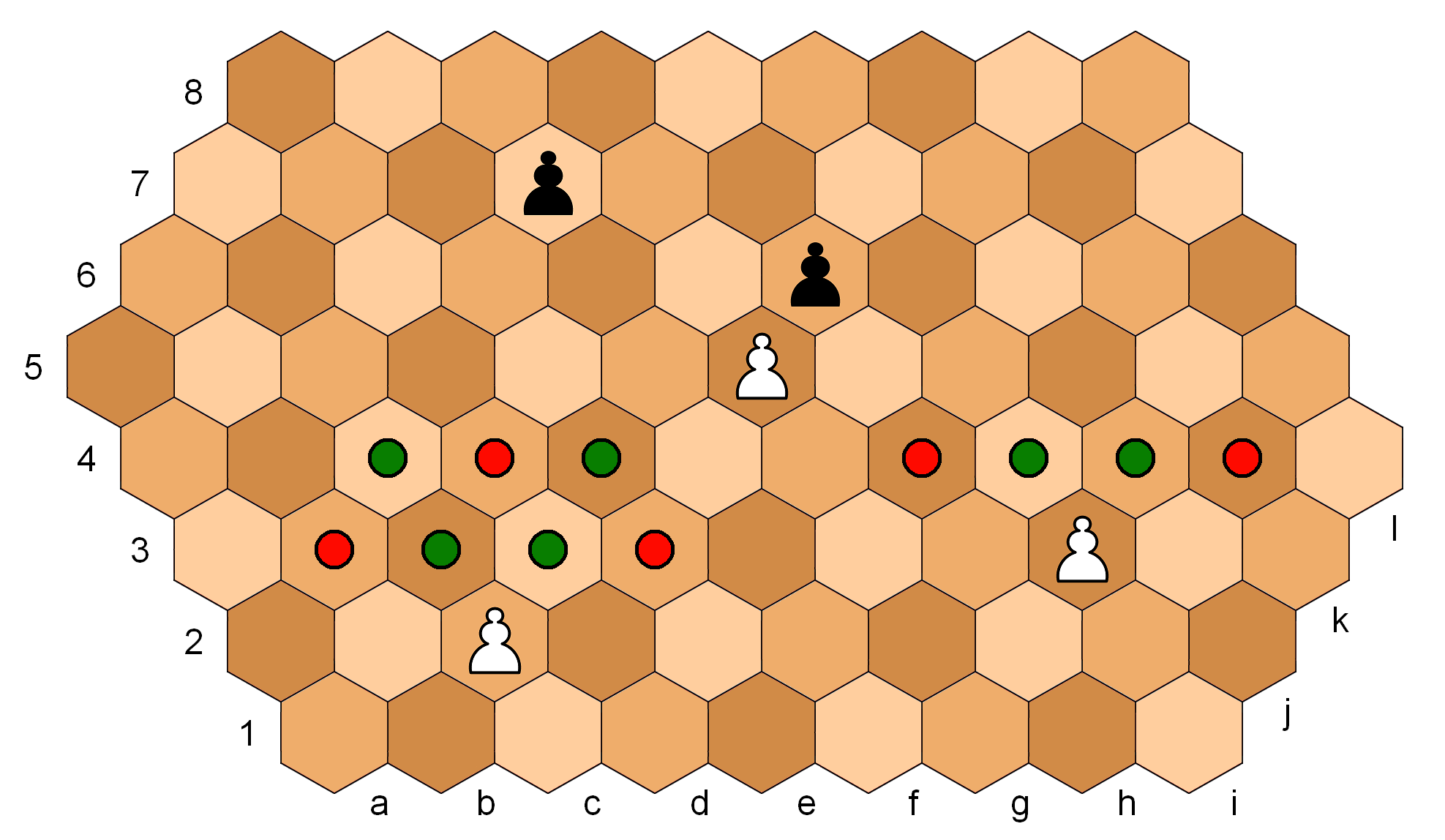
The white pawn on c2, since it has not yet moved, has four move options (green dots) and three ways to capture (red dots). The white pawn on i3 has moved from its initial cell, so has two move options and two ways to capture. The white pawn on g5 and black pawn on h6 block each other from any forward moves. But if Black moves his f7-pawn to either f6 or f5, White can capture it, for example: 1...f7-f5 2.g5xf6 e.p.

A pawn captures diagonally forward, to a cell of the same colour on which the pawn stands. But only a pawn on its initial cell may capture straight forward; once a pawn has moved, it may capture only to the sides. (So, unless it is a wing pawn, an unmoved pawn has three capturing possibilities; a pawn that has moved, two.) En passant captures are permitted in Brusky's chess.

=== Endgame studies ===
These endgame studies apply to Brusky's hexagonal variant:

- king + rook can checkmate a lone king;
- king + two knights can checkmate a lone king;
- king + two bishops can checkmate a lone king;
- king + bishop + knight can checkmate a lone king.

== McCooey's hexagonal chess ==
McCooey's hexagonal chess, starting position

In 1978–79 Dave McCooey and Richard Honeycutt developed another variant of hexagonal chess similar to Gliński's, having four differences: the starting array (including seven pawns per side instead of nine); the pawn's capturing move; pawns on the f-file are not permitted an initial double step; and stalemate is counted as a draw (players receive half a point).

=== Pawn's move ===
This diagram shows the pawn's move in McCooey's variant. The capturing move corresponds to a bishop's move: e.g. if the black pawn on e8 advances to e6, the white pawn on d5 may capture it en passant.

The pawn's move

In the starting position, the f-file pawns may not advance two steps like the other pawns. The f-pawns are also not defended in the opening array, and in fact smothered mate would result if it were captured by a knight, although this possibility would rarely occur in practical play.

=== Endgame studies ===
These endgame studies apply to both Gliński's and McCooey's variants:

- king + two knights can checkmate a lone king;
- king + rook beats king + knight (no fortress draws and a negligible number (0.0019%) of perpetual check draws);
- king + rook beats king + bishop (no fortress draws and no perpetual check draws);
- king + two bishops cannot checkmate a lone king, except for some very rare positions (0.17%);
- king + knight + bishop cannot checkmate a lone king, except for some very rare positions (0.5%);
- king + queen does not beat king + rook: 4.3% of the positions are perpetual check draws, and 37.2% are fortress draws;
- king + rook can checkmate a lone king.

== Starchess ==
Starchess, one possible starting position

Starchess is a hexagonal variant invented by Hungarian chess teacher László Polgár in around 2004. The board is a horizontally oriented regular hexagram, consisting of 37 numbered cells. Due to the small board, games typically finish quicker than in standard chess.

Each player has five pawns, a king, knight, bishop, rook, and queen. The white pawns start at cells 5, 12, 18, 23, and 29; the black pawns at 9, 15, 20, 26, and 33. At the beginning of the game, the players place their other pieces alternately on the cells behind their pawns (White: 4, 11, 17, 22, 28; Black: 10, 16, 21, 27, 34). As a consequence, there are (5!)²=14400 possible setups.

Pawn moves

King moves

Knight moves

Rook moves

Bishop moves

Queen moves

Pawns move one step vertically forward and capture one step orthogonally left-forward or right-forward, and have an initial double-step option (identical to Gliński's pawn); there is no en passant capture. The promotion zone for white pawns consists of Black's back rank (cells 10, 16, 21, 27, and 34), and for black pawns, White's back rank (cells 4, 11, 17, 22, and 28). A pawn that has lost its initial double-step option by making a capture is called a "limping pawn"; a pawn that ended up on cells 2, 3, 35, or 36 is called a "dead pawn"; a pawn on cells 1 or 37 is called a "mummy".
The king moves one step in any orthogonal direction; there is no castling. The knight jumps, two steps in any orthogonal direction, followed by one step in a different direction (identical to Gliński's knight). The rook can move any number of steps, but only vertically; the bishop can move any number of steps, but not vertically. The queen combines the moves of the rook and the bishop, and thus can move any number of steps in any orthogonal direction (identical to Gliński's rook).

== Three player hexagonal chess variants ==
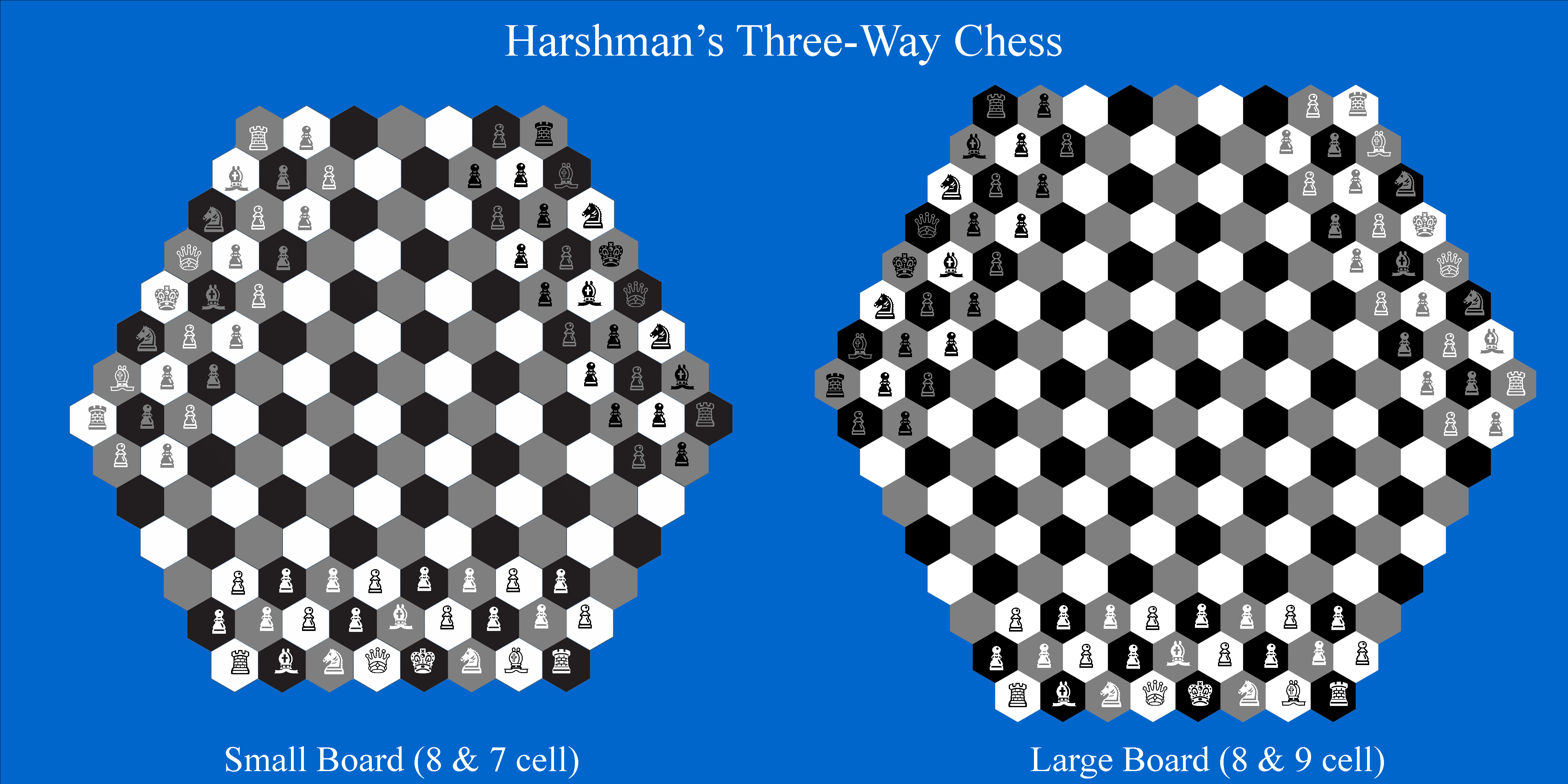
Three-Way Chess uses an irregular hexagonal board. Harshman swapped the initial positions of the knights and bishops in the back row so that each player could begin with a bishop on a cell of each colour.

Some variants are designed for three players. These usually include three bishops per side to cover all cells on the board. Pieces typically move as in another version of hexagonal chess.

=== Three-Handed Hexagonal Chess ===
More commonly known as Wellisch's Hexagonal Chess, Three-Handed Hexagonal Chess was published by Siegmund Wellisch in 1912. The board is a regular hexagon with sides of length 6, which consists of 91 cells; however, it is oriented horizontally. Each side has eight pawns, three knights, two rooks, one queen, and one king. There are no bishops. The pawn moves and attacks one step in one of two orthogonally forward directions; there is no initial double-step, nor en passant capture. The king moves one step in any orthogonal direction. The knight jumps one step in any diagonal direction, and is thus colour-bound. The rook moves any number of steps in one of six orthogonal directions. The queen combines the moves of a rook and a knight. Castling involves the king and a rook simply swapping places.

=== Three-Way Chess ===
Three-Way Chess was designed by Professor Richard Harshman as a neurological experiment. It is played by three players on an irregular hexagonal board of either 140 or 200 cells. In both versions, the home rows of all players are 8 cells wide. The smaller version, however, has 7 cells on the three alternate sides while the larger version has 9. In either case, White always moves first while Black always moves third. The colour of the pieces of the second player should match the third colour of the hexagons on the board. The last version of the Rules issued by Harshman gave either grey or red as options, but his other material also makes reference to green as the additional colour. Each player's third bishop begins in the middle of their second row on a cell matching its own colour. Except for the pawn, pieces move as in Gliński's.

=== Other three player variants ===
- Chesh is played on a 169-cell regular hexagon board. It was designed by Douglas Hofstadter (2005) and interpreted by Gianluca Moro.
- HEXChess is a commercial chess variant by HEXchess Inc.

== Hexagonal chess variants for four or more players ==
Some hexagonal chess variants are multiplayer sports.

=== Chexs ===
Chexs, designed by Stephen P. Kennedy, is a multiplayer variant for up to six players. The version for two and three players uses a regular hexagon with sides of length 6, which consists of 91 cells. (The four–six player version uses a regular hexagon with sides of length 9, which has 217 cells.) Pieces move as in Gliński's but the setup is different. Each player starts with only two bishops, and all bishops are on same-coloured cells. A checkmated player is defeated. The player who gave checkmate takes over control of the pieces of the defeated player. The winner is the player who has checkmated all his opponents.

=== Echexs ===
Echexs, designed by Jean-Louis Cazaux, is a multiplayer variant for up to six players. Its two player version uses the same boards as Chexs, the same moves as Gliński's, but McCooey's setup.

== Other hexagonal variants ==
- Hexagonia (by John Jaques & Son, 1864) was the first published hexagonal chess variant. The board has 127 cells; each side has 1 king, 2 cannons, 4 knights and 8 pawns. The winning objective is not checkmate, but rather to safely bring one's king to the central board cell.
- C'escacs 2007 is a Grand Gliński chess; the board is shaped as a regular hexagon with sides of length 8, which consists of 169 cells. In addition to the Gliński's setup, it introduces a dragon (empress, a rook+knight compound), two pegasi (princesses, bishop+knight compound) and two almogavars (a (2,0)- and (1,1)-leaper compound, i.e. it can jump either to the second square in any orthogonal direction, or move one step diagonally). Pawns' moves are increased to allow forward 60° moves (i.e. they now have three move directions instead of one), and captures are the same way McCooey's chess (i.e. they capture diagonally forward, two options). The scornful pawn capture additional rule counterbalances the excessive pawn mobility.

== See also ==
- Cross chess – with extra pieces on a hexagonal board with cross-shaped cells
- Hexshogi – a shogi variant played on a board with 85 hexagonal cells
- Masonic chess – with tiled squares and features similar to de Vasa's variant
- Sannin shogi – a three-player shogi variant on a hexagonal board
- Troy – a fairy chess variant on a hexagonal board
