= Generals' chess =

Generals' chess may refer to:

- Shogi (将棋) or Japanese chess
- Janggi (장기/將棋) or Korean chess
- Xiangqi or Chinese chess, known in Vietnam as cờ tướng (棋將)
