= Gibo =

Gibo may refer to:

- Gilbert Teodoro
- Gibo (anime)
- Board game record
