= Game of the Three Friends =

Three-player variant of the game xiangqi

Game of the Three Friends

Game of the Three Friends (Chinese: 三友棋, Pinyin: Sān-yǒu-qí ; also called Sanyou Qi or Three Friends Chess) is a three-player variant of the game xiangqi ("Chinese chess"). It was invented by Zheng Jinde (Chinese: 鄭晉德, Zhèng Jìndé) during the Qing dynasty (1661–1722 AD).

The game symbolizes the Three Kingdoms period war (221–264 AD) between the rival states Wei, Shu, and Wu, each vying for control of China after the fall of the Han dynasty.

== Game overview ==
The Three Friends are represented by colors blue, red, and green, respectively. Each player controls all the standard xiangqi pieces, with each general represented by the character of its respective kingdom. In addition, each player controls two extra pieces: "flag" (旗; Qí) and "fire" (火; Huǒ).

A fire moves like a forward-moving ferz: one step diagonally forward, with no retreating, while a flag moves exactly two steps straight forward, until it crosses out of its own territory, after which it moves as a chariot.

Checkmate and other conventions are the same as in xiangqi, except that after a checkmate occurs, the mated general is removed from the game, and the player who delivered the checkmate appropriates the mated player's remaining pieces for his own use. The last surviving kingdom (general) is the winner.

The board includes spaces which restrict travel for certain pieces; these spaces are labeled "ocean" (海; Hǎi), "mountain" (山; Shān) and "city" (城; Chéng). Chariot and horse pieces are not allowed to pass through the ocean space. Cannons are not allowed to pass through mountain and city spaces.

=== Play conventions ===
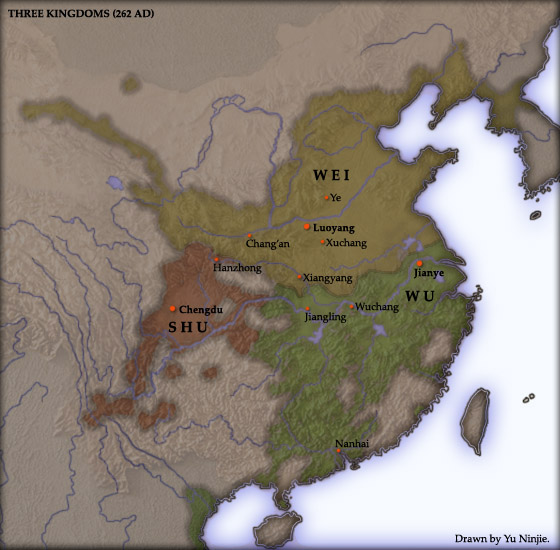
The Three Kingdoms in 262, on the eve of the conquest of Shu.

It may be necessary or desirable to add further play conventions for completeness:

- Red moves first. Then move turns alternate counterclockwise around the board.
- After a checkmate, removal of the mated general and army appropriation are done in a separate move turn. The piece delivering mate replaces the enemy general on its square.

== See also ==
- Game of the Three Kingdoms
- List of Xiangqi variants
- Three-player chess
- Three-man chess
