= Harshman =

Harshman is a surname. Notable people with the surname include:

- Jack Harshman (born 1927), American professional baseball pitcher
- Margo Harshman (born 1986), American actress
- Marv Harshman (1917–2013), American men's college basketball coach
- Richard Harshman, professor at the University of Western Ontario
- Steve Harshman, American politician
