= 將棋 =

將棋 or 将棋 may refer to:

- Shogi (Japanese chess)
- Janggi (Korean chess; written 장기)
