= Hasami shogi =

Variant of shogi

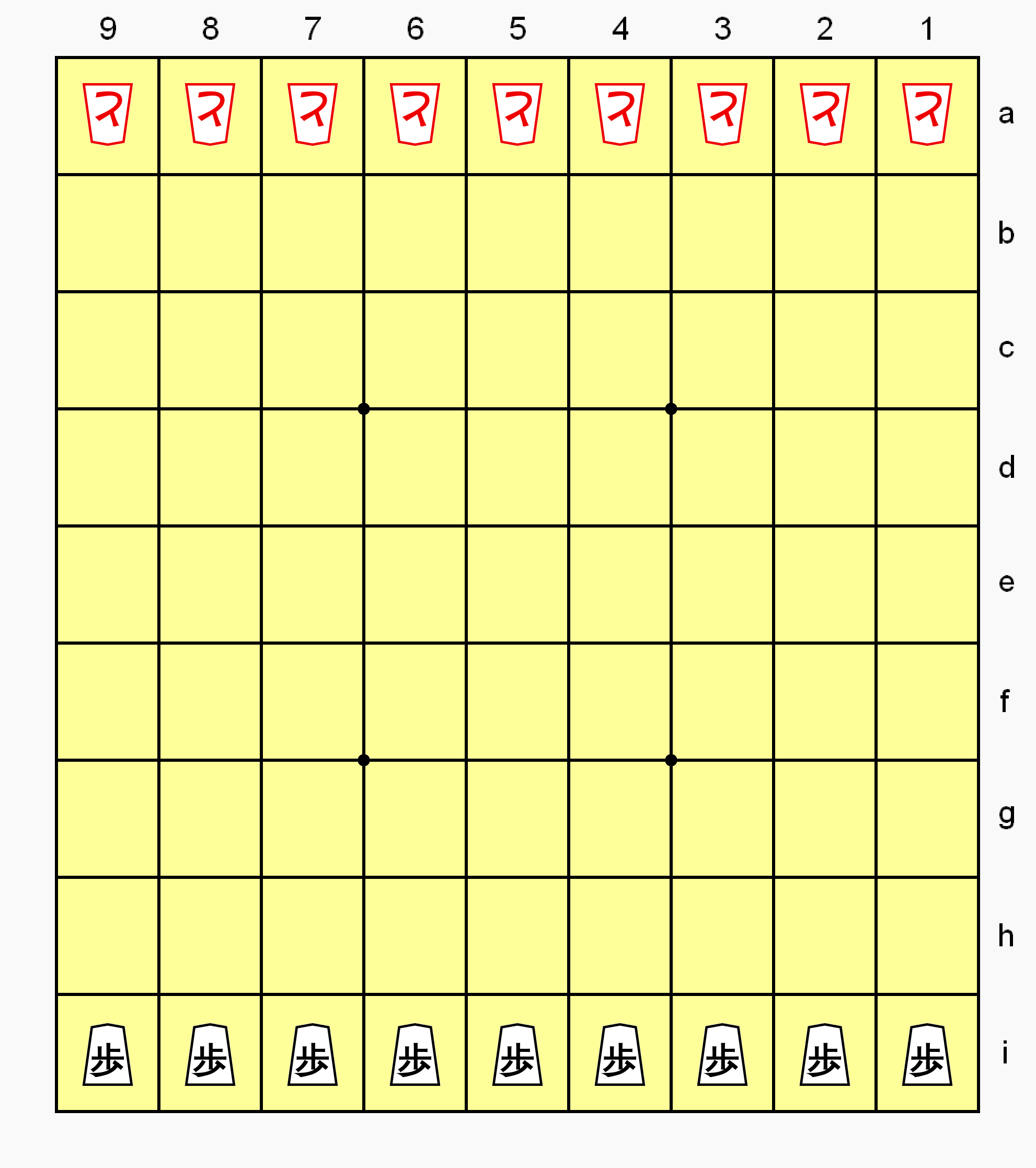
Hasami shogi (Variant 1) starting position

Hasami shogi (はさみ将棋 hasami shōgi, "intercepting chess") is a variant of shogi (Japanese chess). The game has two main variants, and all Hasami variants, unlike other shogi variants, use only one type of piece, and the winning objective is not checkmate. One main variant involves capturing all but one of the opponent's men; the other involves building an unbroken vertical or horizontal chain of five-in-a-row.

Hasami shogi possesses simple rules while offering complex strategy. Variant 1 is popular among Japanese children.

== Variant 1 ==
Play is on a traditional shogi board, with each player having nine men. Traditional shogi pawns (fu) can be used as men; unpromoted pawns (歩) for Black (先手 sente), promoted pawns (と) for White (後手 gote). At the start of the game each player's pieces fill their first rank, with Black's men on the lower side of the board. Black moves first, then players alternate turns. A player wins by capturing all but one of their opponent's men.

=== Moving ===
All pieces move the same as a rook in shogi. (That is, any number of empty cells vertically or horizontally.) A move consists of moving a piece to an empty cell of the board. As in shogi there is no jumping, so a piece can move no further than adjacent to a friendly or enemy piece in its path.

=== Capturing ===
An opponent's piece is captured using the custodian method: the player occupies the two cells adjacent to the piece either horizontally (on a rank) or vertically (on a file). An enemy piece in a corner cell can be captured by occupying the two cells that orthogonally surround it. Captured pieces are removed from the game. Multiple pieces can be captured in a single move if all the cells between the capturing player's two pieces are filled by enemy men.

A player can safely move a piece to a cell between two enemy pieces without being captured. Likewise, it is safe to move a piece to complete a chain of friendly pieces flanked by two opponent pieces—none of the "sandwiched" pieces are captured.

== Variant 2: Dai hasami shogi ==
In this variant each player starts the game with 18 pieces occupying their two nearest ranks. Since most shogi sets have only 9 pawns for each side, this game is usually played using black and white Go stones. Additionally, one-quarter (9×9 grid) of a Go board can be used in lieu of a shogi board. All the move and capture rules of Variant 1 apply, but the winning objective is different, and a jumping move is possible.

=== Winning ===
A player wins by building an uninterrupted line of five stones either horizontally or vertically, all of which must lie outside of the starting two rows of that player.

=== Jumping ===
A piece can move by jumping an orthogonally adjacent piece of either color, to the empty cell immediately beyond it in the same direction. The jumped piece is not captured. Multiple jumps in a single turn are not permitted.

== Other variations ==
=== Main variant variations ===
The main variants have been described also with differences in one or more rules. In variations where pieces move one step only, gameplay develops slower.

Variant 1 variations:

- To win, all enemy men must be captured.
- Instead of moving like rooks, pieces can move only one step to an adjacent empty cell. To win, all enemy men must be captured.
- Instead of moving like rooks, pieces can move only one step to an adjacent empty cell. Each player starts with 18 pieces instead of 9. To win, all enemy men must be captured.

Variant 2 variations:

- A player can win by building five-in-a-row diagonally (in addition to orthogonally).
- Instead of moving like rooks, pieces can move only one step to an adjacent empty cell. A player can win by building five-in-a-row diagonally (in addition to orthogonally).

=== Mak-yek ===
Mak-yek is a similar game played in Siam (and Malaysia under the name Apit-sodok). On an 8×8 board, each player's 16 stones are placed on the first and third rows. The moves are the same, but captures are by intervention in addition to the custodian method. Intervention capture is the opposite of custodian capture: if a stone moves between two enemy stones, it captures both stones.

=== Take ===
A hexagonal variant invented in 1984 by Mike Woods.
