= Three-player chess =

Family of chess variants specially designed for three players

Three-player chess (also known as three-handed, three-man, or three-way chess) is a family of chess variants specially designed for three players. Many variations of three-player chess have been devised. They usually use a non-standard board, for example, a hexagonal or three-sided board that connects the center cells in a special way. The three armies are differentiated usually by color, with White, Black, and Red serving as the most common color combination.

Three-player chess variants (as well as other three-player games) are the hardest to design fairly, since the imbalance created when two players gang up against one is usually too great for the defending player to withstand. Some versions attempt to avoid this "petty diplomacy" problem by determining the victor as the player who first delivers checkmate, with the third player losing in addition to the checkmated player, or having the third player getting a half-point.

== Three-player variants ==
=== Boards with hexagonal cells ===
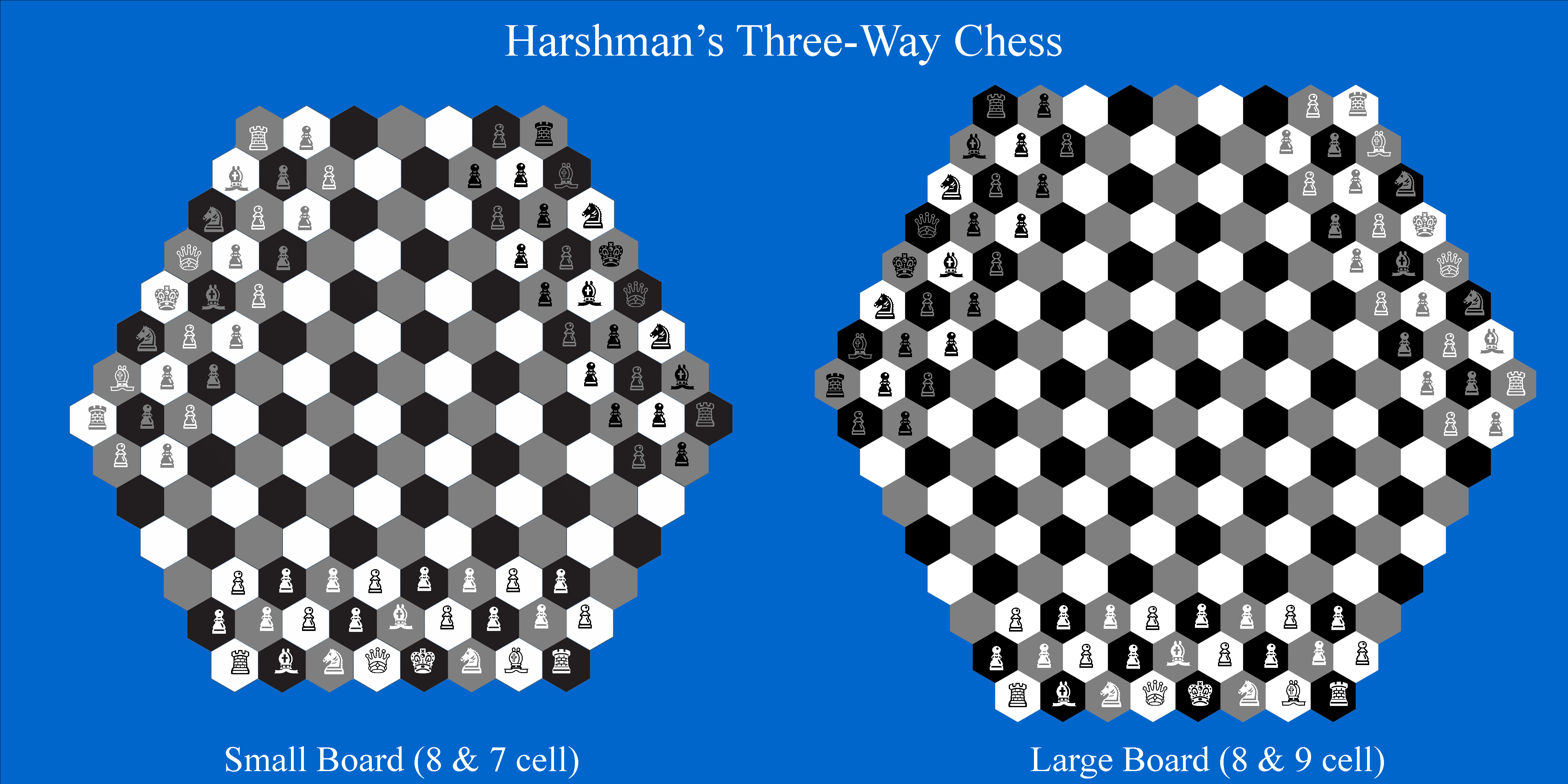
Three-Way Chess uses an irregular hexagonal board. Harshman swapped the initial positions of the knights and bishops in the back row so that each player could begin with a bishop on a cell of each colour.

Some variants use a board with hexagonal cells. Usually three bishops per side are included, to cover all cells of the hex playing field. Pieces move usually as in one of the versions of hexagonal chess.

- Chesh: Played on a 169-cell regular hexagon board. By Douglas Hofstadter (2005); interpreted by Gianluca Moro.
- Chexs: By Stephen P. Kennedy. Multi-player variant for up to six.
- Echexs: By Jean-Louis Cazaux. Multi-player variant for up to six.
- HEXChess: Commercial chess variant by HEXchess Inc.
- Three-Handed Hexagonal Chess, more commonly known as Wellisch's Hexagonal Chess: Published by Siegmund Wellisch in 1912. It has no bishops; instead, each of the three knights move one space only in any of the six "diagonal" directions.
- Three-Way Chess: Played by three players on an irregular hexagonal board of either 140 or 200 cells. By Richard Harshman. In both versions, the home rows of all players are 8 cells wide. However, the smaller version has 7 cells on the three alternate sides while the larger version has 9.

=== Boards with quadrilateral cells ===
==== Hexagonal boards ====
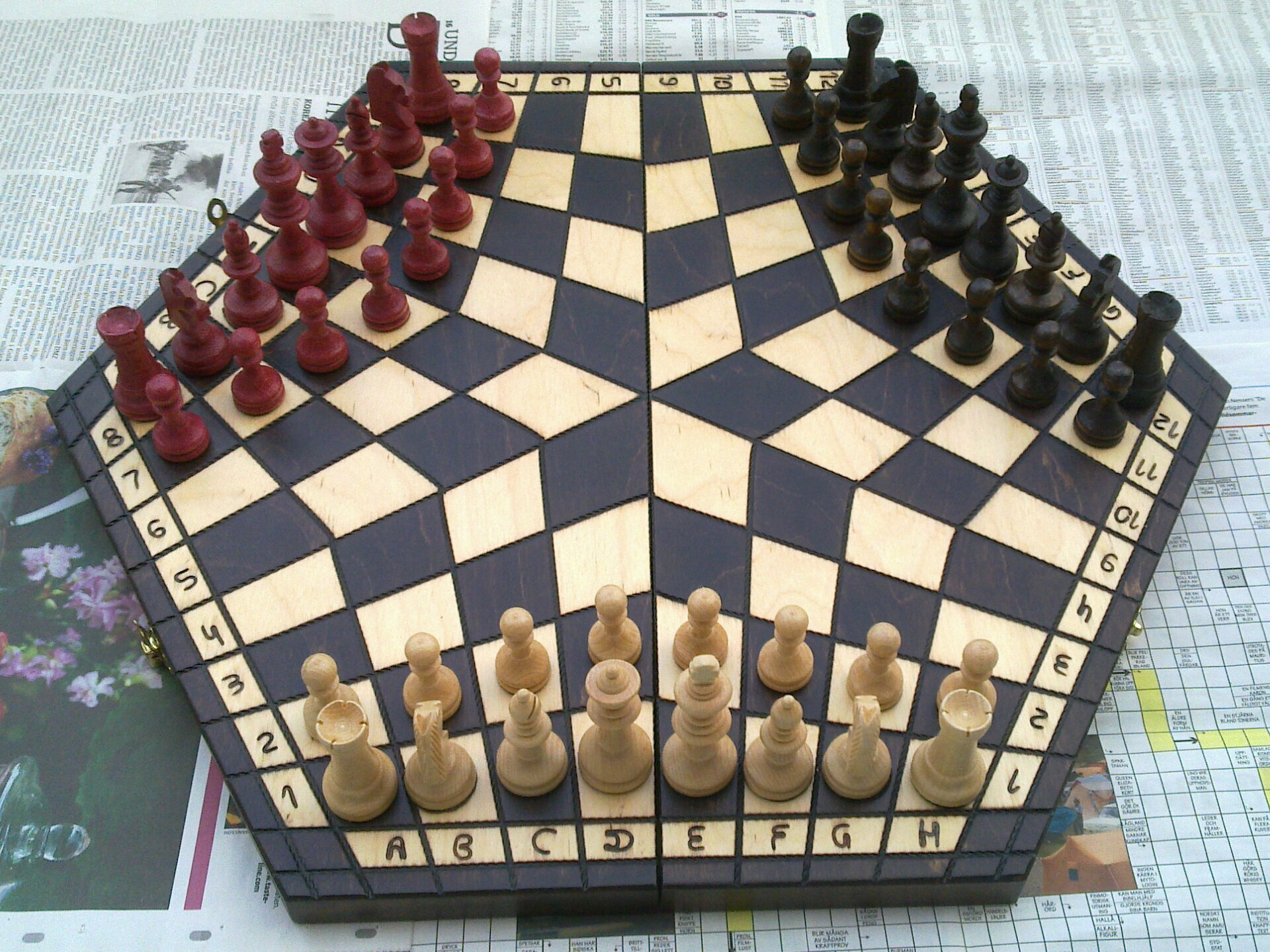
A regular hexagon 96-cell board is a frequent choice by inventors of three-player chess.

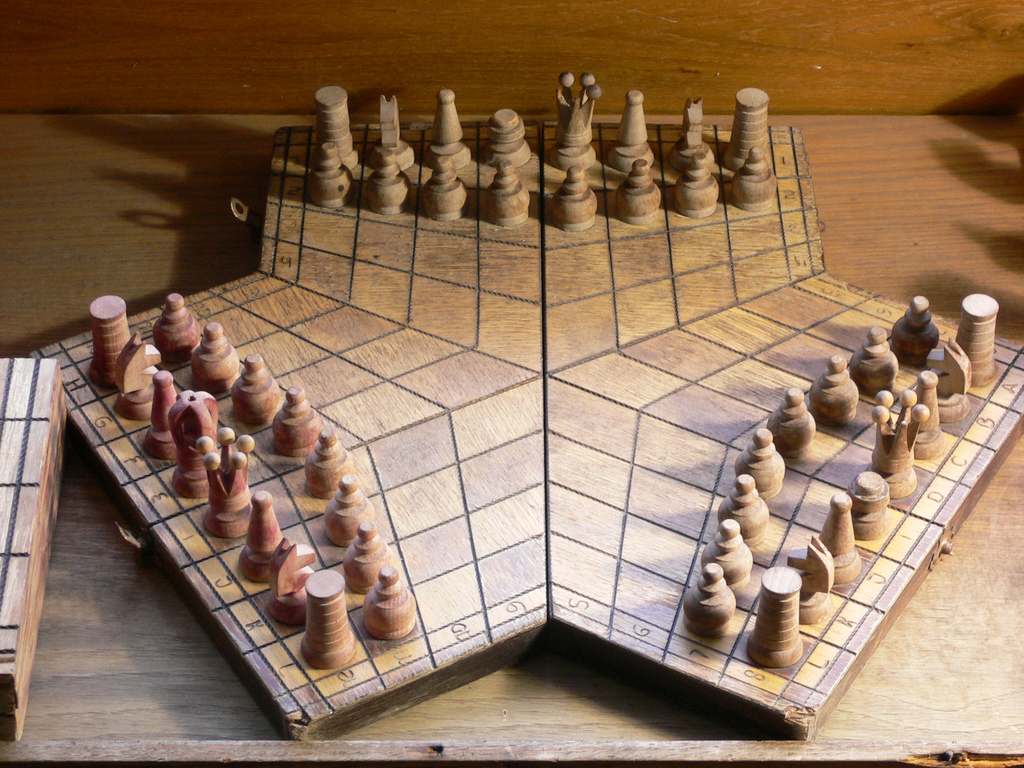
Chess for three geometry, also using 96 quadrilateral cells. The wooden armies are stained slightly different colors.

Some variants use a hexagonal-shaped board with quadrilateral cells (see example in the photo).

- Trichess: Features a "non-aggression" rule whereby a player in inferiority is immune from capture in his home portion by a numerically superior opponent, unless the capture also gives check. A pawn that reaches the back rank of an opponent is exchanged for any previously captured friendly piece. Played on a 96-cell board. By Christophe Langronier (date unknown).
- Chess for three: By Jacek Filek (1992).
- Three-Man Chess: Pawns reaching the 5th rank gain multi-direction capability. The first player to give checkmate wins. Played on a 96-cell board. By George Dekle Sr. (1984).
- Trio-Chess: Played on a 96-cell board, a center triangle splits the central files. By Van der Laken and G. J. Buijtendorp (1979).
- Three-Player Chess: Played on a 96-cell board, the patent for this game provides suggested rules whereby kings are captured, and the player with the last-remaining king wins. The pieces of an eliminated player remain on the board and may be captured. A player may move into check. The patent also describes a variant whereby the army of an eliminated player is appropriated by the capturer. By Robert Zubrin (1971).
- Self's Three-Handed Chess: Played on a 144-cell board. By Henry J. Self (1895).
- Waidder's Three-Handed Chess: Played on a 126-cell board. By S. Waidder (1837).

==== Other boards ====
Some variants have used other board shapes with quadrilateral cells.

- III-Color-Schach: Uses a special three-dimensional board or can be used with three-colored boards.
- Megachess: Uses a roughly triangular board with 130 squares. Pawns have multi-direction capability. Players manage the first-mated player's army according to one of three options. The last surviving player wins. By Mega Games/Danny McWilliams (1986).
- Mad Threeparty Chess: Play starts on an empty 10×10 board with players placing their pieces initially, including an extra king per side. Kings are designated so that each opponent attacks a different king of a given player. By V. R. Parton (1970).
- Triple Chess: Uses a chessboard unbalanced by 8×3 extensions on three sides. A player must checkmate or stalemate both opponents to win, using only pieces of his color. By Philip Marinelli (1722).

=== Boards with triangular cells ===
Guide to Ilshat Tagiev's three-player chess (click image for extensive pdf rules tutorial (in Russian))

Triangular cells not on the perimeter have three cells obliquely adjacent, and three cells adjacent at points.

- A variant patented in 2008 by Russian Ilshat Tagiev uses a hexagonal board with triangular cells. Armies are initially set up in the corners of the hexagon. Play order is clockwise around the board. All pieces move as in standard chess but adapted to the triangular boardcell geometry. Adjacent cells of the same color form the board's "diagonals"; adjacent cells of opposite color form the board's "orthogonals" (vertical and horizontal). Pawns can move in any direction on vertical or horizontal lines. (So, pawns can be directed against both opponents.) Pawns do not promote.
  A special "Rule of Neutrality" addresses the petty diplomacy problem while maintaining the possibility of cooperation: The player whose turn it is to move, can capture an enemy man only if the third player did not capture a man of that enemy on the previous move, or if that enemy captured a man of the player (thus, the possibility of concerted serial attacks by two players against a third is ruled out).

=== Circular boards ===
Circular boards have three- or four-sided cells, but not triangular or quadrilateral.

- 3 Man Chess: Uses a circular board

=== Three Handed Chess ===
In 1978, artist Barry Thomas invented "Three handed chess" played on a normal 64 square chessboard - as a performance art work at the Artists co-op. Player A. plays White, B. plays Black and C. plays White: so all players play for both sides. The game remains not the personal contest. He sees it as a testament against the oppositional nature of conflict and war. Players become side-less and strategies are discussed and agreed collaboratively with no secret agendas.

=== Using fairy pieces ===
Some variants incorporate fairy chess pieces in addition to standard chess pieces.

- Orwell Chess: Uses a cylindrical board with quadrilateral cells. Armies consist of fairy pieces gryphon, dabbabah, pao, raja, etc. By Glenn E. Overby (2002).
- Tri-Chess: A three-player variant using an irregular hexagon board with triangular cells. Chancellors and cardinals replace queens. By George Dekle Sr. (1986).

== Strategy ==
The introduction of a third player drastically alters the style of play, even when standard pieces are used. Many chess openings are useless due to the extended board and third player. Each player must think twice as far ahead — anticipating the moves of both opponents, with the added complexity that the next player may move to attack either opponent.

If a player trades off pieces with a second player, the third player benefits. Hence, players will be more reluctant to make trades. Players often avoid such trades so as to carry out other strategies.

The introduction of the "extra" move by the third player can introduce situations of deadlock, for example, if a white piece is undefended and simultaneously attacked by both black and red pieces. It is not advantageous for Black to take the white piece, since Red would then capture the black piece next turn. Thus the black and red pieces are both simultaneously attacking the white piece and defending it from attack by the other player. In similar situations, a piece can move quite safely to a square where it is attacked by both opponents, since neither opponent would take the piece and risk capture by the third player.

In games where the third player loses as well as the checkmated one, players must concentrate not only on their own attack and defense, but also on preventing the two opponents from checkmating one another. A player can take advantage of one opponent's position to checkmate the other, but must be careful that the third player does not checkmate first. White could checkmate Red, only to have his piece captured by a black piece, which checkmates Red. In this situation, White would lose since Black delivered the final checkmating move. This strategy also applies to games which give the checkmating player command of the checkmated opponent's pieces – a player who allows the second player to checkmate the third would surely go on to lose due to the increased power of his remaining opponent, now armed with the third player's pieces.

== See also ==
- Four-player chess
- Game of the Three Friends
- Game of the Three Kingdoms — a three-player xiangqi variant using a hexagonal board with quadrilateral grids
- Hexagonal chess
- Sannin shogi — a three-player shogi variant using a hexagonal board with hexagonal cells
- Three sided football
