= Game of the Three Kingdoms =

Three-player Chinese chess variant

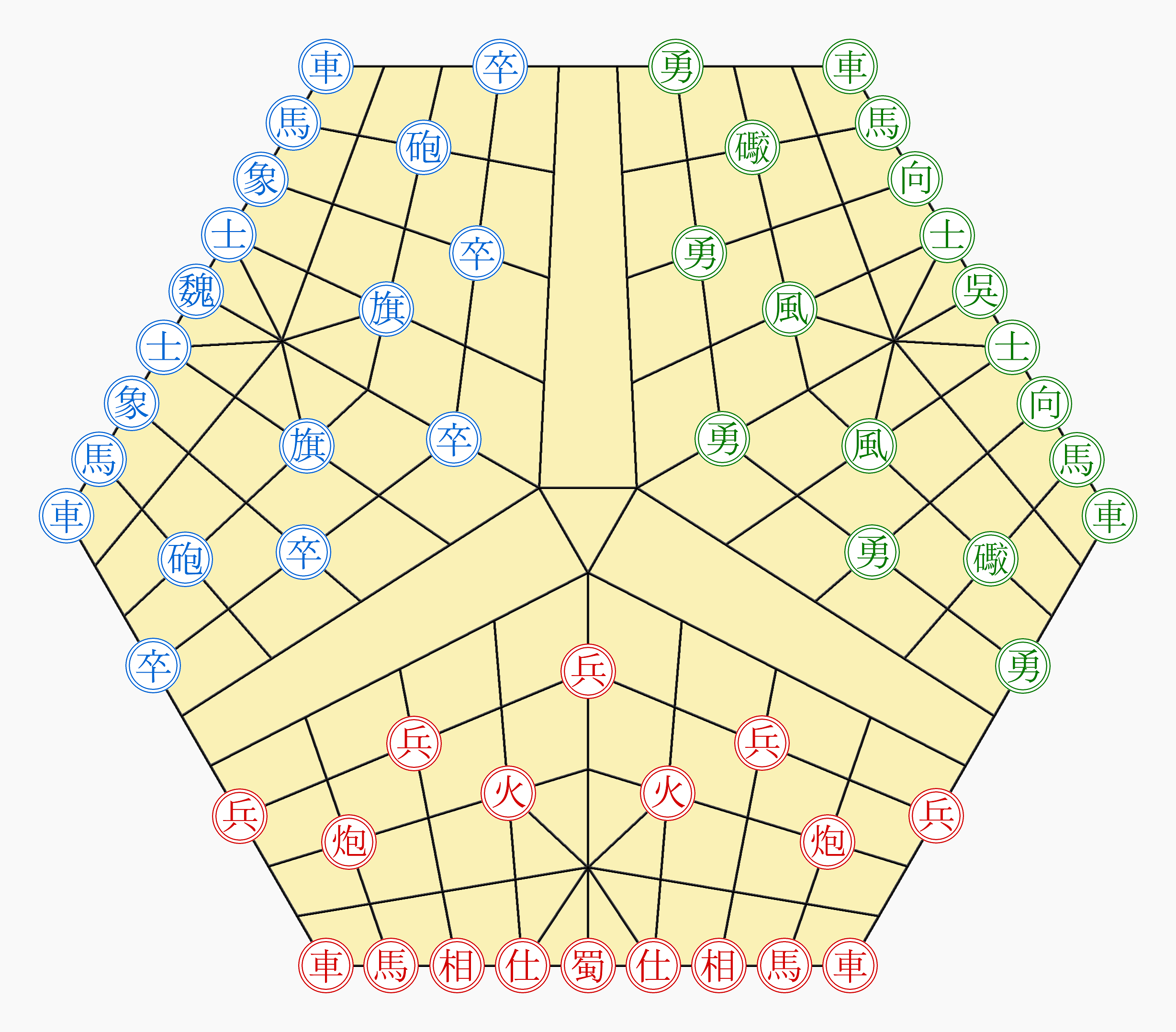
The diagram shows all the usual xiangqi pieces, except generals are replaced by the kingdom names Wei (魏), Shu (蜀), and Wu (吳) representing the three rival emperors. The Green player has additionally its own distinctive symbols for its elephants (向 xiang ), cannons (礮 pao ), and soldiers (勇 yong ). The bannermen pieces (if used) start on the upper corner points of the players' 3×3 palaces.

Game of the Three Kingdoms (Chinese: 三國棋, Pinyin: Sān-guó-qí ; also called Sanguo Qi, Three Kingdoms Chess, or Three-Handed Xiangqi) is a three-player variant of the game xiangqi ("Chinese chess"). The game symbolizes the Three Kingdoms period war (221–264) between the rival states Wei, Shu, and Wu, each vying for control of China after the fall of the Han dynasty.

== History ==
The period of origination of Sanguo Qi is disputed and either belongs to the Southern Song dynasty (1127–1279) or the Qing dynasty (1644–1911). The two original Chinese texts which described the game are lost.

O. von Möllendorff reported on the game in [German] "Schachspiel der Chinesen" (English: "The Game of Chess of the Chinese") in the publication Mittheilungen der deutschen Gesellschaft für Natur- und Völkerkunde Ostasiens (English: "Journal of the German Society for Natural and Cultural Science of East Asia"), Leipzig, 1876. (Note: Mittheilungen der deutschen Gesellschaft für Natur- und Völkerkunde Ostasiens, XI, ii, Leipzig, 1876. Published by Buchdruckerei des "Echo du Japon".) Möllendorff depicts a hexagonal gameboard comprising three xiangqi half-boards (9 × 5 = 45 intersection points each). The board displays the traditional xiangqi "river", but with three arms separating the three opponent confrontations.

Subsequent to Game of the Three Kingdoms, similar three-player xiangqi variants emerged utilizing half-boards but with different center-connecting geometries and corresponding rules. One of these is Game of the Three Friends (Chinese: 三友棋, Pinyin: Sān-yǒu-qí ; also called Sanyou Qi or Three Friends Chess) invented by Zheng Jinde (Chinese: 鄭晉德, Zhèng Jìndé) during the Qing dynasty (1661–1722).

== Game overview ==
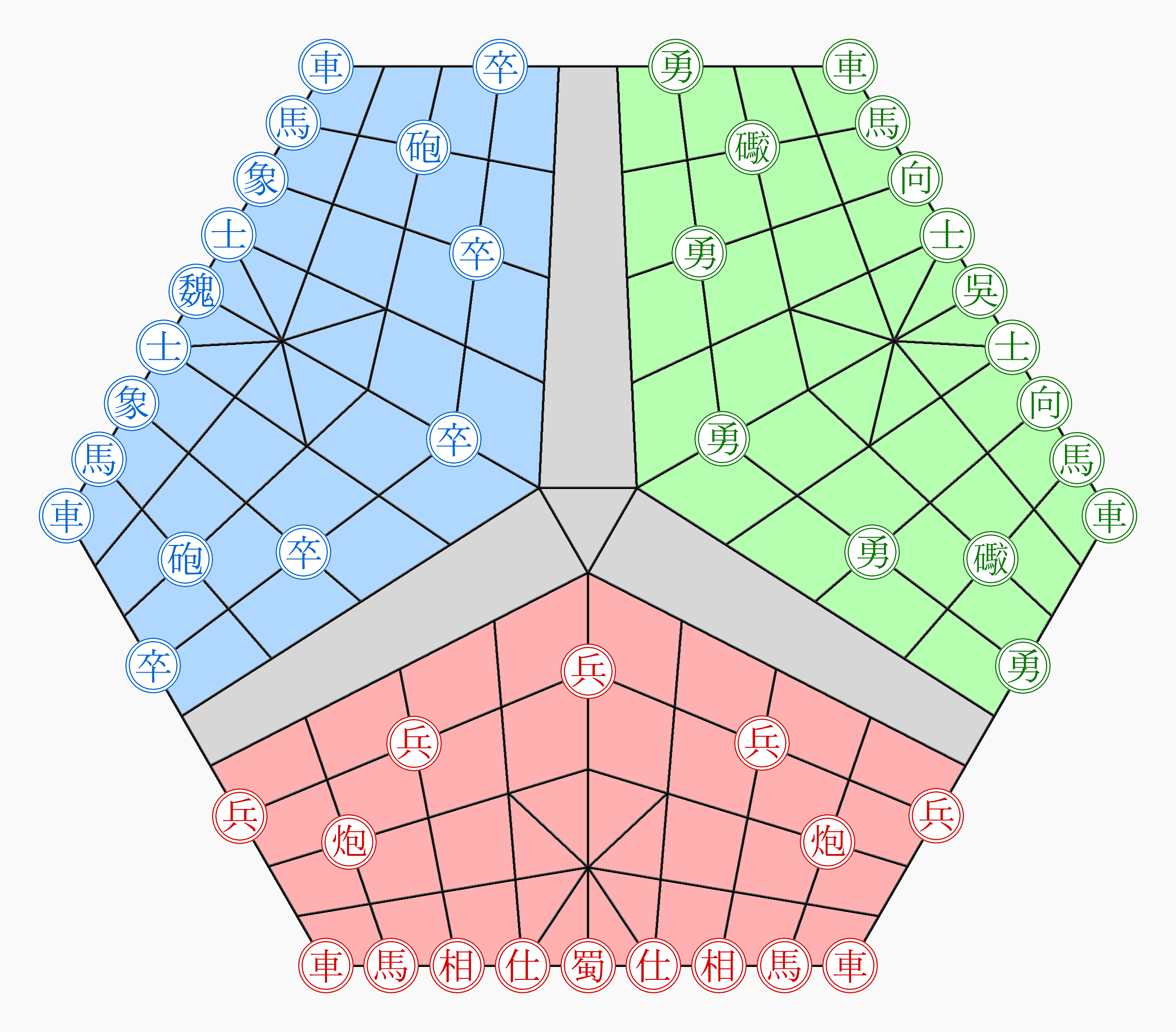
The diagram shows colored kingdoms for clarity (Wei/Blue, Shu/Red, and Wu/Green). This play setup is without the bannermen pieces, which are optional.

The three kingdoms Wèi (魏), Shǔ (蜀), and Wú (吳) are represented by colors blue, red, and green, respectively. Each player controls all the standard xiangqi pieces, with each general represented by the letter of its respective kingdom. In addition, each player controls two bannermen pieces: "flag" (旗 qí) for Wei/Blue, "fire" (火 huǒ ) for Shu/Red, and "wind" (風 fēng ) for Wu/Green. The use of bannermen is optional—Game of the Three Kingdoms is also played without them. A bannerman moves like extended xiangqi horse: two steps orthogonally, then one step diagonally outward, with no jumping.

Checkmate and other conventions are the same as in xiangqi, except that after a checkmate occurs, the mated general is removed from the game, and the player who delivered the checkmate appropriates the mated player's remaining pieces for his own use. The last surviving kingdom (general) is the winner.

=== Play conventions ===
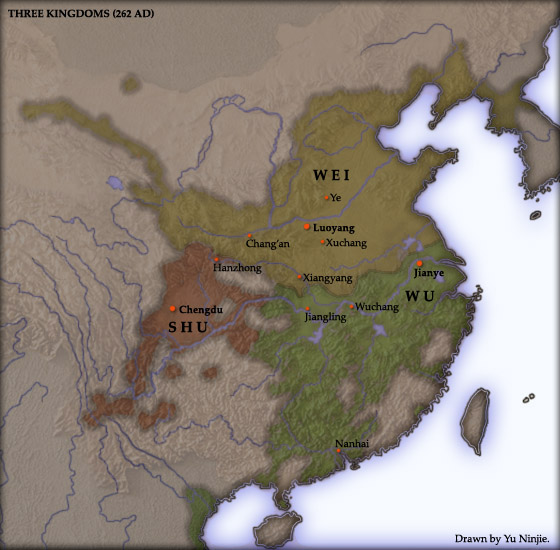
The Three Kingdoms in 262, on the eve of the conquest of Shu

It may be necessary or desirable to add further play conventions for completeness:

- Shu/Red moves first. Then turns alternate counterclockwise around the board.
- A chariot or cannon that reaches a central triangle point when traveling along a file, may cross the river in either of two directions and continue along the file of another kingdom.
- After a checkmate, removal of the mated general and army appropriation is done in a separate turn. The piece delivering mate replaces the enemy general on its square.
- Stalemate results in the same army appropriation as described for checkmate. If two players' pieces cooperate in stalemating the third player, the player making the move that completed the stalemate condition is the player who appropriates the stalemated player's army.

== See also ==
- Game of the Three Friends
- List of xiangqi variants
- Three-player chess

== Bibliography ==
- Bodlaender, Hans; Leary, Steven; Cazaux, Jean-Louis; Ren Dong, Yu (18 March 2009). "Game of the Three Kingdoms". The Chess Variant Pages.
- Cazaux, Jean-Louis (4 April 2009). "Sanguo Qi (Three Kingdoms Chess) & Sanyou Qi (Three Friends Chess)". History.chess.free.fr.
- Dong, Yu Ren; Cazaux, Jean-Louis (23 March 2009). "Game of the Three Friends". The Chess Variant Pages.
- Gollon, John (1968). Chess Variations • Ancient, Regional, and Modern. Charles E. Tuttle Company Inc. LCCN 06811975.
- Murray, H. J. R. (1913). A History of Chess (Reissued ed.). Oxford University Press. ISBN 0-19-827403-3.
- Pritchard, D. B. (1994). The Encyclopedia of Chess Variants. Games & Puzzles Publications. ISBN 0-9524142-0-1.
- Pritchard, D. B. (2007). Beasley, John (ed.). The Classified Encyclopedia of Chess Variants. John Beasley. ISBN 978-0-9555168-0-1.
