= Awithlaknakwe =

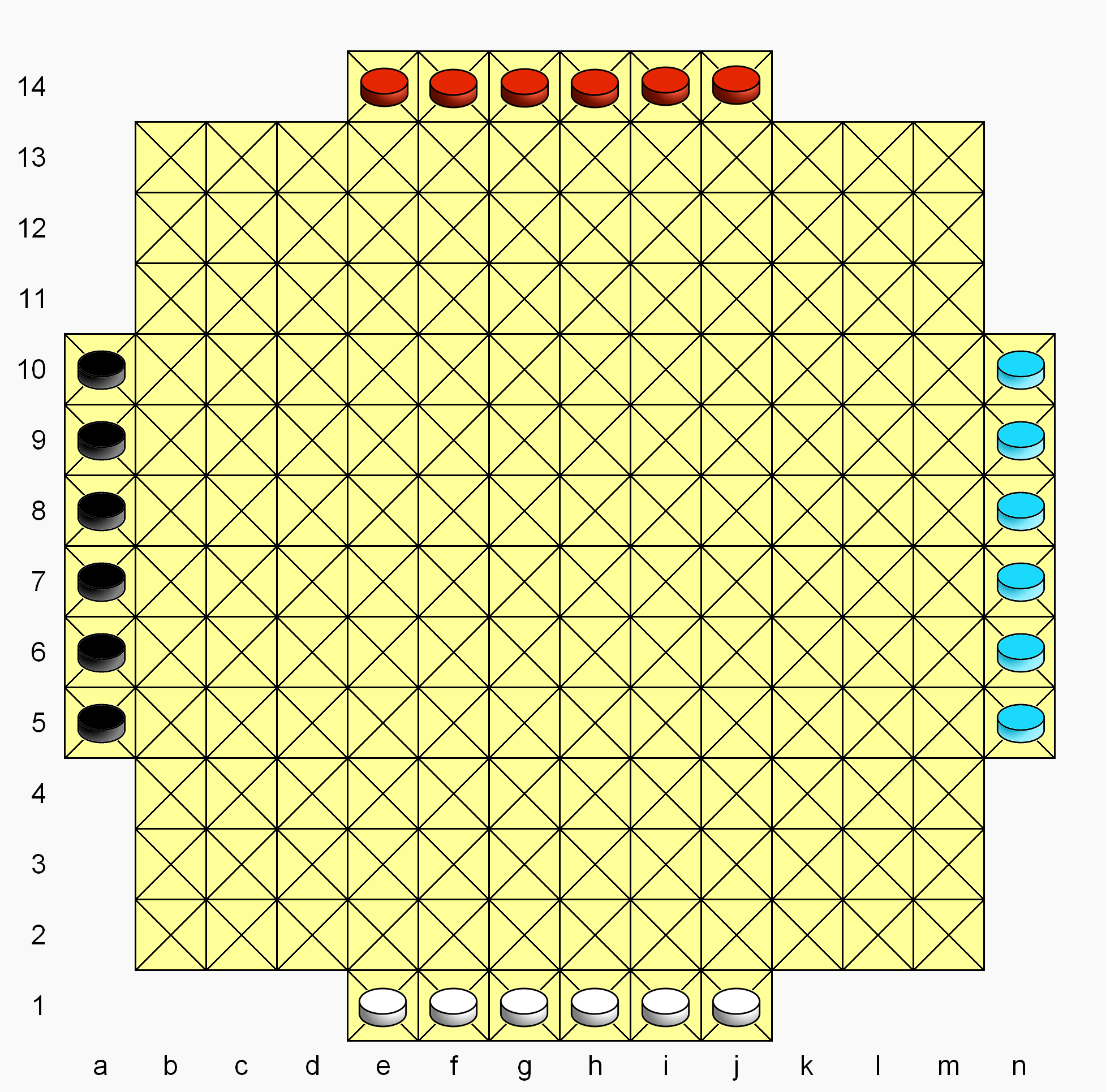
Awithlaknakwe gameboard and starting setup for four players (two teams): Red and Black vs. White and Blue

Awithlaknakwe (also known as stone warriors, or game of the stone warriors) is a strategy board game from the Zuni Native American Indians of the American Southwest. The board contains 168 squares with diagonal grids. Two or four may play, with players identified as North, West, South, and East.

The game was described by Stewart Culin in his book Games of the North American Indians (1907).

== Equipment ==
The gameboard is a 12×12 square grid with six extra squares centered on each of the four sides, totaling 168 squares. Diagonal lines run through each square (the diagonal lines are called trails; the orthogonal lines are called canyons). Each player has six warriors, and a seventh piece not yet in play called the priest of the bow.

The historical board was cut into stone slabs, and pieces were small discs of pottery with tops either plain or having a hole in their centers to differentiate ownership. The priest of the bow was distinguished from friendly pieces by being somewhat larger. (Note: "The disks are in two sets, 12 plain and 12 perforated [...] In addition, there are two pieces, one plain and one perforated, somewhat larger than the others." Cat. no. 16550, 17861, Free Museum of Science and Art, University of Pennsylvania.)

== Game rules ==
Each player starts the game with six warriors on their six nearest squares (the player's home rank). The goal is to bring one's pieces to the opponent's home rank, while capturing as many enemy pieces as possible. The winning condition for this ancient game is not completely defined (see #Incomplete rules).

- Warriors move one square diagonally forward (along trails). Backward moves are not permitted.
- An enemy piece can be captured using the custodian method—by flanking it on both adjacent squares along a diagonal. Captured pieces are removed from the game.
- The first warrior of each player that is captured is removed and replaced by the player's priest of the bow, which is entered on the player's home rank. The priest of the bow can move one square orthogonally (straight right, left, or forward, crossing canyons) as well as diagonally forward like a warrior. (Note: F. H. Cushing's description reported by Culin: "When a player gets one of his opponent's pieces between two of his own, it may be taken, and the first piece thus captured may be replaced by a seventh man, called the priest of the bow, which may move both on the diagonal lines and on [crossing] those at right angles.") It cannot move backward.

=== Two players ===
Players sit at opposite sides of the board; North plays against South.

=== Four players ===
North and West are partners against South and East. Each team owns one priest of the bow (not two).

== Incomplete rules ==
The rules described by F. H. Cushing and reported by Culin, and subsequently by Bell and Murray, lack specificity on some points:

- How a player wins is unclear. One could conjecture that the total number of pieces that reach the opponent's home rank and the number of pieces captured are totaled to determine the winner. The same issue applies when four play.
- When four play, it isn't clear whether partners play a combined set of 12 warriors, or each plays a differentiated set of 6 warriors. (The implication is a combined, undifferentiated set.)
- It is unknown which player traditionally moves first, how the first player is chosen, and the order of turns when four play.

== See also ==
- Bizingo
