= Bizingo =

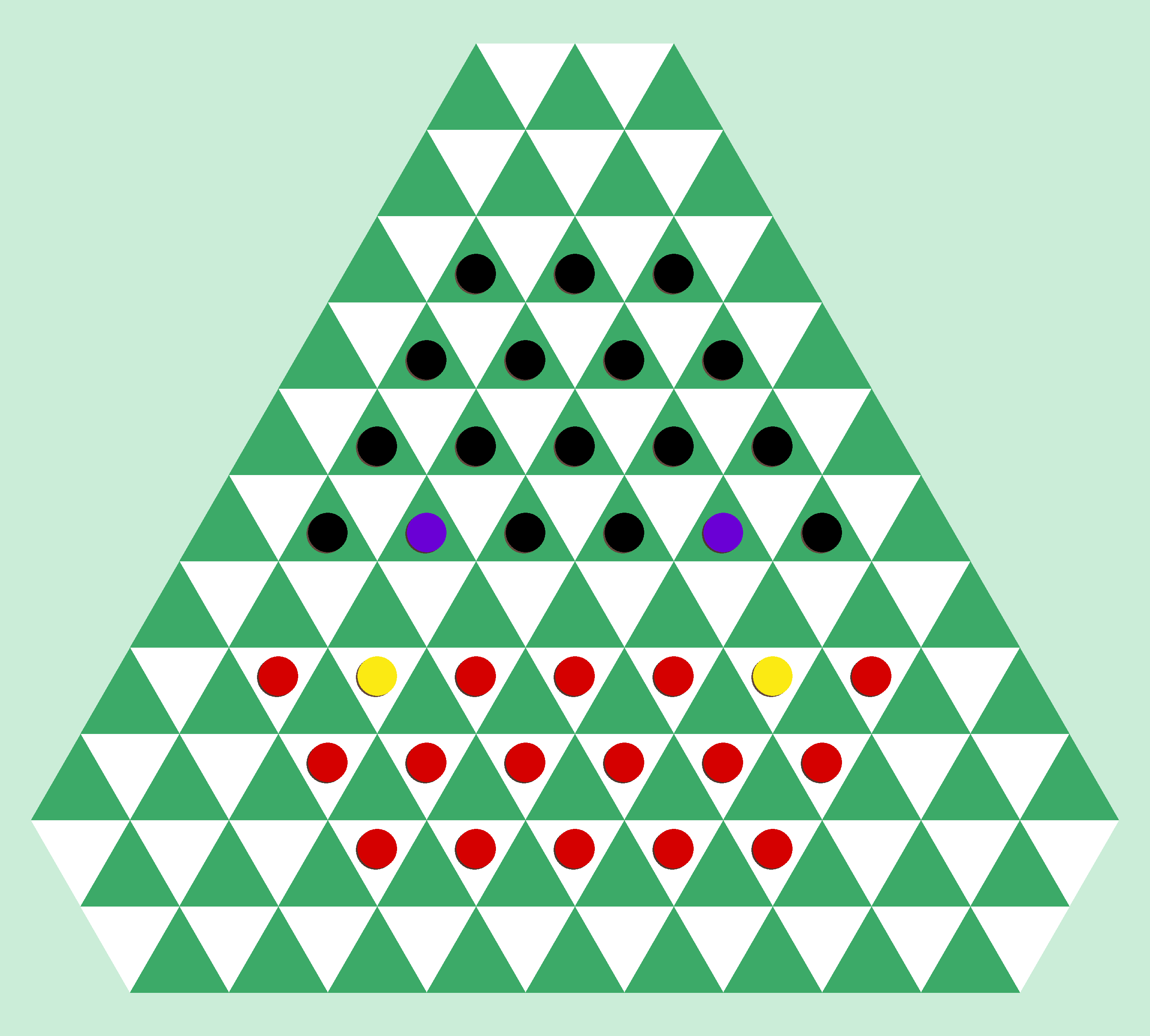
Bizingo gameboard and starting setup. For this diagram, captains are purple and yellow.

Bizingo is a two-player strategy board game created sometime in the 1850s in the United States. Two opposing armies on a triangular grid face off against one another. The game seems unrelated to any other, except perhaps to the traditional Zuni game Awithlaknakwe.

== Setup ==
The board is in the shape of an equilateral triangle with truncated corners. It contains 157 triangular cells in an alternating color pattern; 75 cells are light-colored, 82 are dark-colored. Each player has 18 pieces in their own color: 16 regular pieces and 2 captains.

Because the board is triangular, the two armies are set up asymmetrically (see illustration). One player sets their pieces near a base of the triangle on light-colored cells in three rows: seven pieces in the front row, six pieces in the middle row, five pieces in the third row; the back row is left empty. The other player sets their pieces at the opposite end of the triangle on dark-colored cells in four rows: six pieces in the front row, five pieces in the second row, four pieces in the third row, three pieces in the fourth row; the two back rows are left empty. Each player's two captains are placed in their front row, one cell inward from the left and right sides. An empty row separates the armies.

== Game rules ==
Players decide who moves first. Turns alternate. A player can move only one of their pieces per turn.

=== Objective ===
A player wins the game by reducing the opponent to two pieces.

=== Moves ===
A player can move a piece to any empty adjacent cell of the same color; so, on an open board, six moves are possible. Throughout the game, a player's pieces are restricted to cells of the same color.

=== Captures ===
A captured piece is immediately removed from the game.

- A regular enemy piece is captured by surrounding it on three sides (i.e. by the custodian method).
- A captain is captured by surrounding it on three sides, with the caveat that one of the surrounding pieces must be a captain. (Three regular pieces are insufficient and the enemy captain would be unaffected.)
- An enemy piece on a row at the edge of the board can be captured by surrounding it on two sides, with the caveat that one of the surrounding pieces must be a captain. (Two regular pieces are insufficient.)
- If a piece (regular or captain) is moved to a cell already surrounded by three enemy pieces, it is instantly captured, unless the move itself performed a capture.

More than one enemy piece can be captured in one move, but the above caveats still apply in all cases.

== See also ==
- Awithlaknakwe
