= List of Xiangqi variants =

Many variants of xiangqi have been developed over the centuries. A few of these variants are still regularly played, though none are nearly as popular as xiangqi itself.

== Two-player variants ==
- Congo, invented by Demian Freeling
- Manchu chess, invented by the Bannermen during the Qing dynasty
- Mini Xiangqi, invented by Shigenobu Kusumoto in 1973, played on a 7x7 board with no river, no advisors, no elephants, and no promotion (pawns always have the option to move sideways).

== Three-player variants ==
- Game of the Three Friends
- Game of the Three Kingdoms

== Seven-player variants ==
- Game of the Seven Kingdoms (七国象棋), invented by Sima Guang

== See also ==
- Chess variant
- Shogi variant
- List of Janggi variants
