= List of janggi variants =

Many variants of janggi have been developed over the centuries. A few of these variants are still regularly played, though none are nearly as popular as janggi itself.

== Gwangsanghui ==
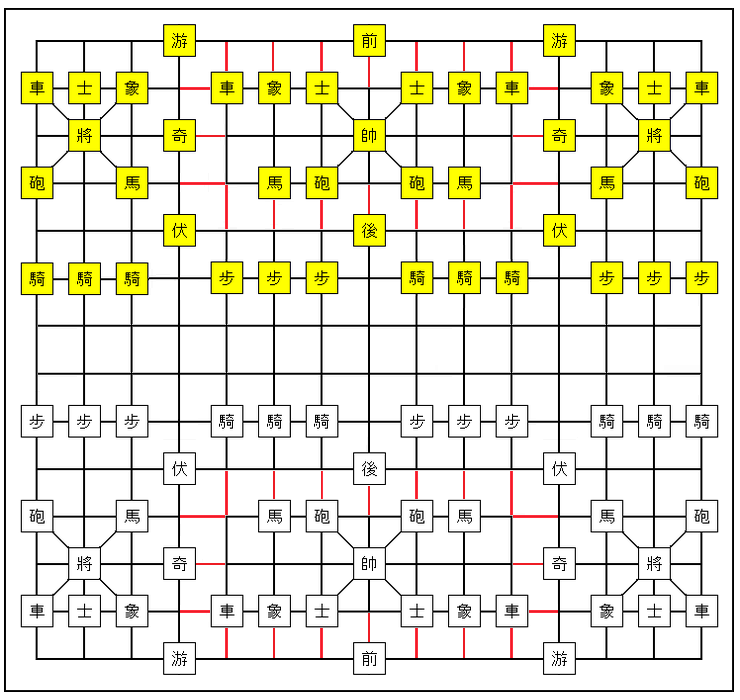
Gwangsanghui

Gwangsanghui (광상희; 廣象戱) is an 18th-century janggi variant. It was recorded in Noeyeonjip (뇌연집) which was written by Nam Yuyong (남유용).

== Sanjangjanggi ==
Sanjangjanggi (산장장기; 三將象棋) is an janggi variant with an unusual rule. In sanjangjanggi, the king can escape check only by capturing the checking piece with the king in the next turn. Thus, double check is an automatic loss for the side with the checked king since the king cannot capture both checking pieces in a single move.

== Other variants ==
- Dainyongjanggi (다인용장기)
- Kkomajanggi (꼬마장기)
- Dongtakjanggi (동탁장기)
- Eopgijanggi (업기장기)
- Gungjanggi (궁장기)
- Tapjanggi (탑장기)

== See also ==
- Shogi variant
- Xiangqi variant
- Chess variant
