= Korea Janggi Association =

The Korea Janggi Association was founded in 1956 for the promotion of Janggi, or Korean chess, and is based in Seoul, South Korea.
