= Manchu chess =

Variant of xiangqi created during the Qing dynasty

Manchu chess board and starting setup. The red chariot can also be placed on i1.

Manchu chess (Chinese: 满洲棋; pinyin: Mǎnzhōuqí), also known as Yitong or Yitong chess (Chinese: 一统棋; pinyin: Yìtǒngqí), is a variant of xiangqi. It was created during the Qing dynasty by the Bannermen and was one of the most popular board games among them.

== Rules ==
Black's pieces are set up and move the same as in xiangqi, but horses, cannons, and one of the chariots are absent for Red. The remaining chariot has the combined powers of the chariot, horse, and cannon. Although Black appears to have the advantage, the lethality of the red chariot can easily lead to a losing endgame if Black does not play cautiously. The red chariot is believed to be the representation of Solon soldiers who were brave and battle-hardened during the Manchu conquest of China.

== See also ==
- List of Xiangqi variants
- Maharajah and the Sepoys
