= Three-man chess =

Chess variant intended for three players and played on a hexagonal board

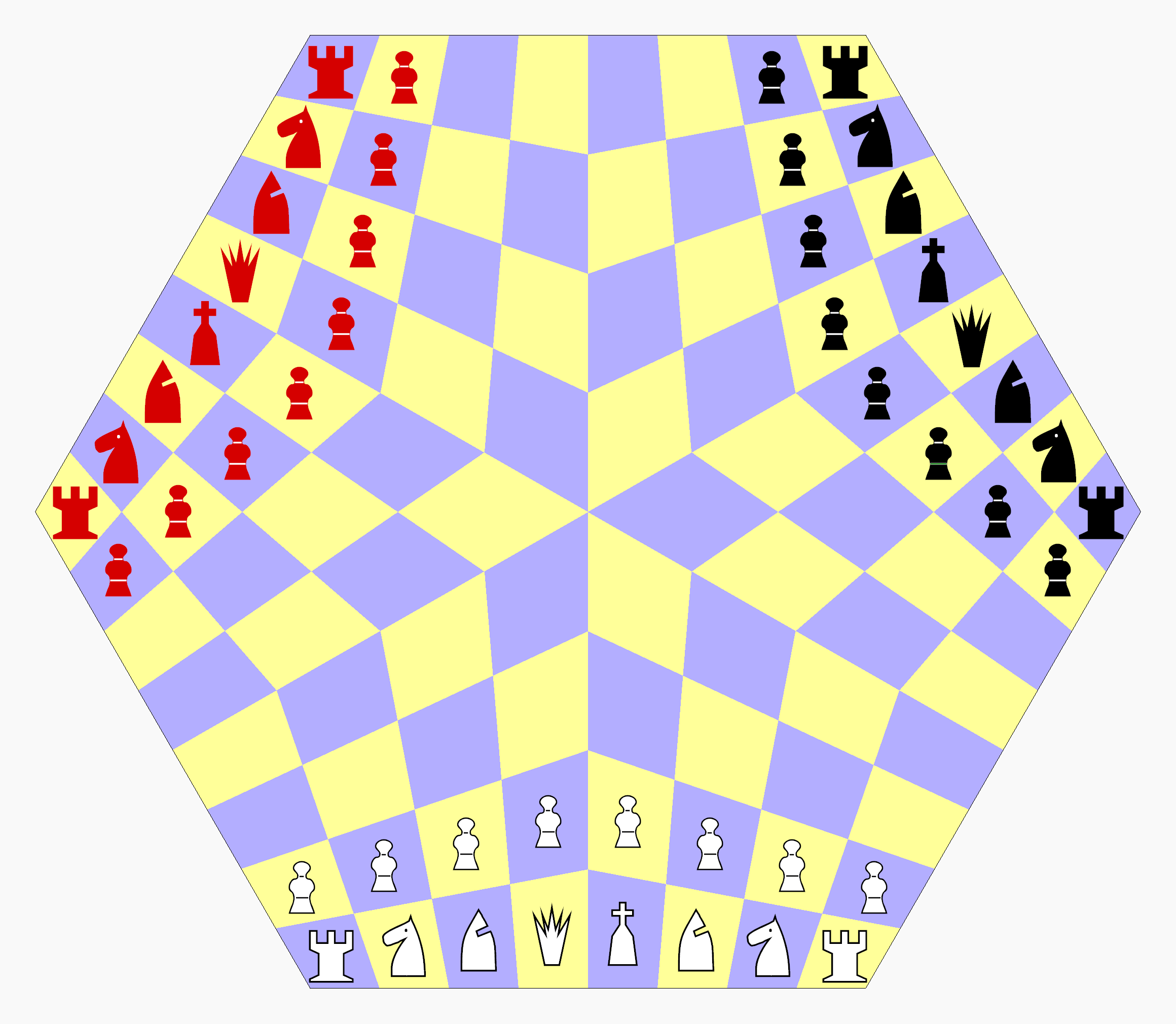
Three-man chess gameboard and starting position (Note: This board geometry (three chessboard halves fused together) and initial setup are frequently seen in three-player chess variants, for example, Three-Player Chess (Zubrin, 1971), Drier-Schach (Schmidt Spiele, 1970s), Yalta (Spindler, 1975), and ThreeChess (ThreeChess Team, 2010). The games vary by their rulesets.)

Three-man chess is a chess variant for three players invented by George R. Dekle Sr. in 1984. The game is played on a hexagonal board comprising 96 quadrilateral cells. Each player controls a standard army of chess pieces.

Three-man chess was included in World Game Review No. 10 edited by Michael Keller.

== Game rules ==
The illustration shows the starting setup; each player's queen is placed to the left of their king. White moves first and play proceeds clockwise around the board. Pieces move the same as they do in chess, with some special features described below. Standard conventions apply including castling, a pawn's initial two-step option, en passant, and promotion. The first player to checkmate an opponent wins the game.

=== Special move features ===
- A queen or bishop moving along a long diagonal will change square colors when crossing the center of the board.
- A knight jumps in a familiar "L" pattern of the chess knight: two steps orthogonally in the same direction, then one step orthogonally to the side. Jumping by other than a (2,1) leap is not permitted. (Note: On a regular chessboard, a knight has four different leap patterns, all resulting in identical move possibilities. But the results on the three-man board are not equivalent, and only a (2,1) leap is permitted.)
- A king pawn or queen pawn on its fourth rank has three diagonally forward ways to capture. A pawn always captures to a square of the same color.
- A pawn that reaches its fifth rank gains the ability to move orthogonally in any direction, and to capture diagonally in any direction. (Note: It transforms to the "arrow pawn" fairy piece.) However, it may not reenter its home one-third portion of the board.
- A pawn has three possible promotion ranks: the back ranks of either opponent, and the furthest rank directly opposite the player.

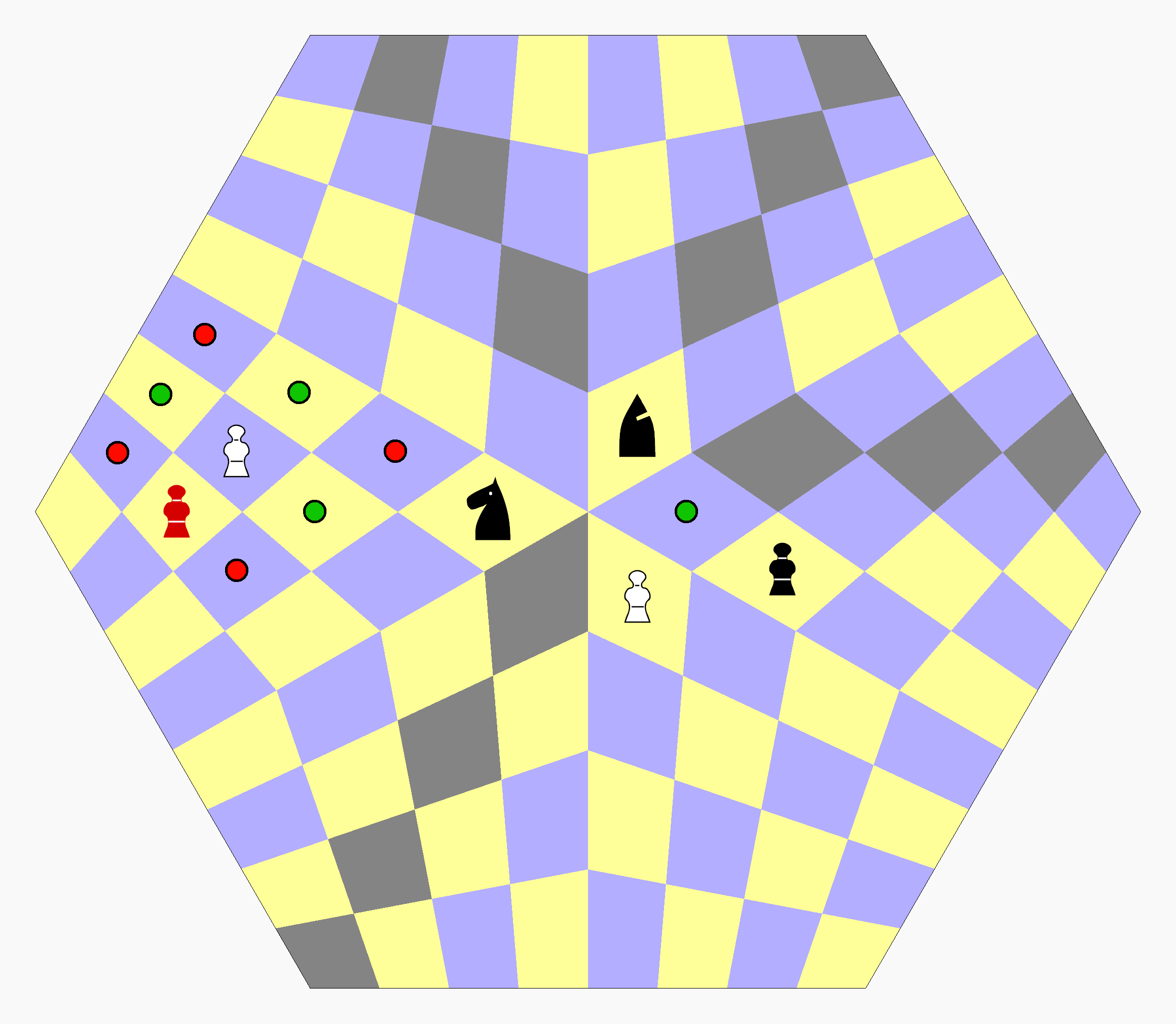
The bishop moves along diagonals in the diagram colored dark gray and changes square colors if crossing the center. White's king pawn can advance to the cell with green dot, or capture Black's knight, pawn, or bishop. (The bishop cannot take the pawn, however, since it is not on a diagonal path for doing so.) White's pawn in Red territory is an "arrow pawn" able to move to green dots (one of which promotes) or capture on red dots. It cannot capture Red's pawn, which is also blocking it from moving to that cell. (Should the red pawn move forward, White can take it. For example, if the red pawn moves forward with a double-step, White can take it diagonally backwards e.p.)

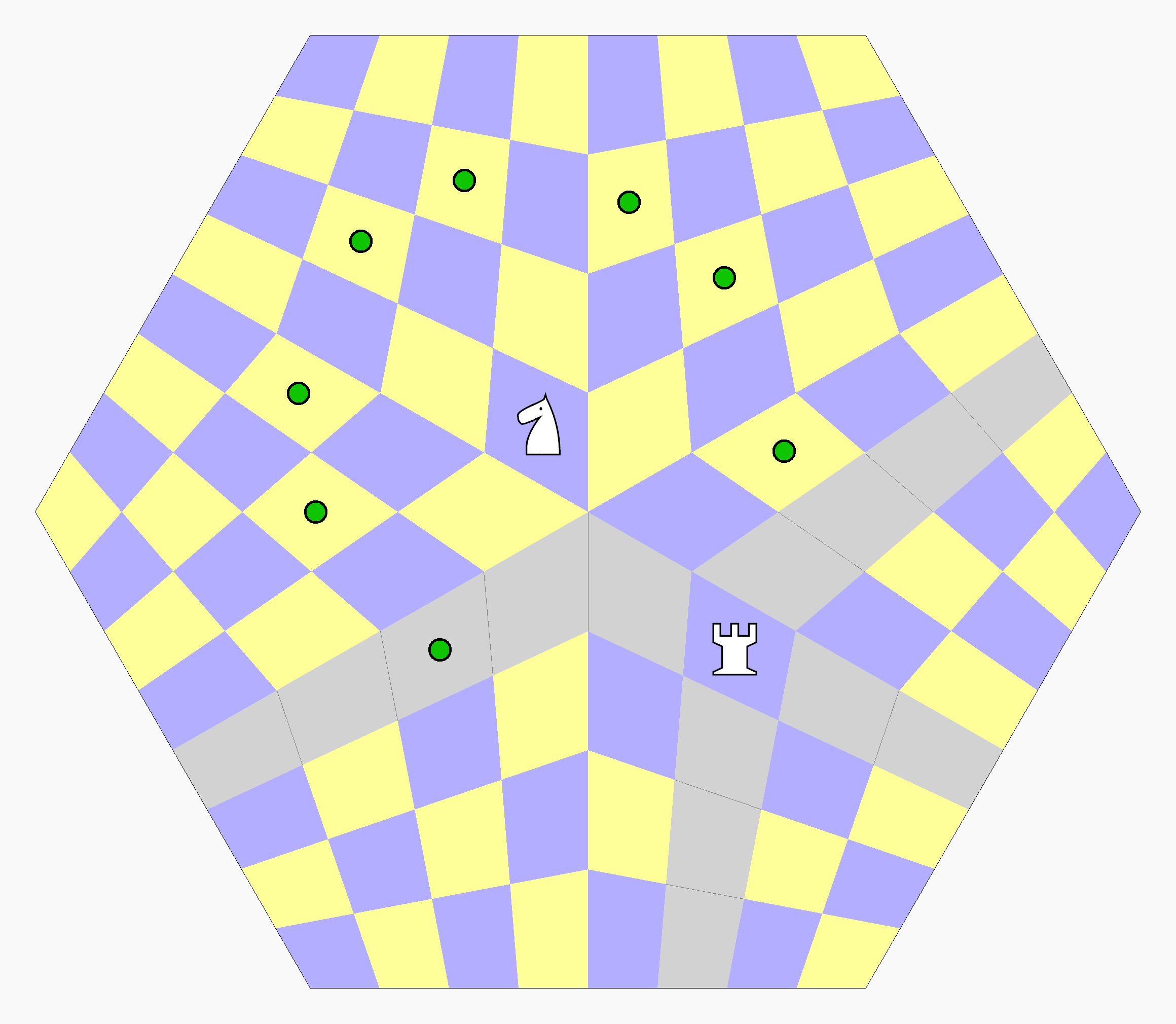
The rook moves along the rank and file in the diagram colored light gray. The knight can move to any cell with a green dot.

=== Stalemate ===
A player who is stalemated loses their turns to move, unless/until an opponent plays a move that releases the stalemate condition. While stalemated, their king is still subject to checkmate, and their other pieces are still subject to capture.

== See also ==
- Three-player chess
- Also by George Dekle:
  - Tri-chess – a three-player variant with triangular cells
  - Quatrochess – a four-player variant with square cells
  - Triangular chess – a two-player variant on a hexagonal board with triangular cells
