= Richard A. Harshman =

Canadian psychologist

Richard A. Harshman was a member of the Department of Psychology of the University of Western Ontario since 1976, rising in the ranks to the level of Full Professor. He died suddenly on Thursday, January 10, 2008.

He was one of the pioneers of Latent semantic analysis. He made important contributions in psychometrics including the analysis of asymmetric square tables and the analysis of multiway tables. His work on parallel factor analysis (PARAFAC) is used in biomedical applications, Chemometrics, and Wireless communications.

Harshman also invented three-way chess rules.
