= Janggi =

Chess variant native to Korea

- Janggi board and starting setup
- Genres: Board game; Abstract strategy game; Mind sport
- Players: 2
- Setup time: < 1 minute
- Playing time: From 20 minutes to several hours
- Chance: None
- Skills: Strategy, tactics
- Synonyms: Changgi; Janki; Korean chess

- Janggi
- Hangul: 장기
- Hanja: 將棋
- RR: janggi
- MR: changgi

Janggi (Korean: 장기, also romanized as changgi or jangki), sometimes called Korean chess, is a strategy board game popular on the Korean Peninsula. The game was derived from xiangqi (Chinese chess), and is very similar to it, including the starting position of some of the pieces, and the 9×10 gameboard, but without the xiangqi "river" dividing the board horizontally in the middle.

Janggi is played on a board nine lines wide by ten lines long. The game is sometimes fast paced due to the jumping cannons and the long-range elephants, but professional games most often last over 150 moves and so are typically slower than those of Western chess.

In 2009, the first world janggi tournament was held in Harbin, Heilongjiang, China.

== Rules ==
=== Board ===
The board is composed of 90 intersections of 9 vertical files and 10 horizontal rows. The board has nearly the same layout as that used in xiangqi, except the janggi board has no "river" in the central row. The pieces consist of disks marked with identifying characters and are placed on the line intersections (as in the Chinese games xiangqi and Go). Janggi pieces are traditionally octagonal in shape, and differ in size according to their rank. The sides are Blue (or sometimes Green), which moves first, versus Red. Each side has a palace that is three lines by three lines (nine positions) in the centre of their side of the board against the back edge. The palace contains four diagonal lines extending outwards from the centre, forming an "X" shape.

The spacing between vertical lines is slightly wider than the spacing between horizontal lines. Therefore, the space created by the vertical and horizontal lines takes the shape of a slightly wide rectangle.

=== Pieces ===
The pieces are labelled with hanja. The characters on the red pieces are all written in the regular script while the blue/green pieces are all written in the cursive script.

==== General ====

The pieces that are equivalent to the kings in Western chess are actually referred to as generals (將軍 janggun) in Korean. They are labelled with the Chinese character Han 한 (in Chinese pinyin: Hàn; 漢) on the red side, and Cho 초 (Chǔ; 楚) on the blue side. They represent the rival states of Han and Chu that fought for power in the post-Qin dynasty interregnum period in China (see Chu–Han contention). In North Korea, the Chu–Han setup is not used; the red general there is called jang (將, 'general') and the blue general is called gwan (官, 'minister'). Both kings can also be referred to generally as gung (宮, 'palace').

Janggi differs from its Chinese counterpart in that the janggi general starts the game from the central intersection of the palace, rather than from the centre intersection of the back edge. The general may move one step per turn along marked board lines to any of the nine points within the palace. There are four diagonal lines in the palace connecting the centre position to the corners. When the general is checkmated the game is lost. The general cannot leave the palace under any circumstances. If the generals come to face each other across the board, and the player to move does not move away, this is bikjang—a draw. This rule is different from that of xiangqi where it is illegal for the generals to face.

In janggi, a player may pass his turn, which is called "한수쉼 (han-soo-shim)". Unless the general is in check, there is no restriction on when or how many times one can pass during the game. The game ends up a draw if both side pass. Stalemate does not result in the end of a game in janggi; if a player has no legal move left, he is just forced to pass and the other player can still continue.

In the diagram below, the blue general can move diagonally (provided that these points are not attacked by enemy pieces), but the red general cannot, since there are no diagonal markings at that point.

==== Guards ====

The pieces are labeled sa 사 (士) and are civilian government officials (i.e. council members serving the commander in chief). They are often called guards, since they stay close to the general. Other names are assistants or mandarins.

The guards start to the left and right of the general on the first rank. They move the same as the general, one step per turn along marked lines in the palace. The guards are one of the weakest pieces because they may not leave the palace. They are valuable for protecting the general.

==== Horses ====

Called the horse or ma 마 (馬). The horse moves one step orthogonally then one step diagonally outward, with no jumping. If there is a piece on its first step (the red circles in the diagram), it is restricted from moving in that direction. This piece is exactly the same as the horse in xiangqi. A horse can be transposed with an adjacent elephant in the initial setup.

==== Elephants ====

The elephants or sang 상 (象) begin the game to the left and right of the guards. They move one point orthogonally followed by two points diagonally away from their starting point, ending on the opposite corner of a 2×3 rectangle. Like the horse, the elephant is blocked from moving by any intervening pieces (the red circles in the diagram). Unlike xiangqi, which confines elephants to their own side of the board behind a "river", in janggi there is no river and elephants are not limited to one side of the board. The janggi elephant can therefore be used more offensively than the xiangqi elephant. An elephant can be transposed with an adjacent horse in the initial setup.

==== Chariots ====

These are labelled cha 차 (車). Like the rook in Western chess, the chariot moves and captures in a straight line either horizontally or vertically. Additionally, the chariot may move along the diagonal lines inside either palace, but only in a straight line. The two chariots begin the game in the corners. The chariot is the most powerful piece in the game.

==== Cannons ====

These are labelled po 포 (包). Each player has two cannons. The cannons are placed on the row behind the soldiers, directly in front of the horses (if the horses are put on the file next to the chariots). The cannon moves by jumping another piece horizontally or vertically. The jump can be performed over any distance provided that there is exactly one piece anywhere between the original position and the target. To capture a piece, there must be exactly one piece (friendly or otherwise) between the cannon and the piece to be captured. The cannon then moves to that point and captures the piece. They may also move or capture diagonally along the diagonal lines in either palace, provided there is an intervening piece in the centre (i.e. it can only happen if the cannon is at a corner of the palace) They are powerful at the beginning of the game when "hurdles" are plentiful, but lose value rapidly with attrition. The other piece over which the cannon jumps may not be another cannon, nor can a cannon capture another cannon. In the diagram below, the blue cannon can move to the blue circles but not to the red ones; it can also capture the red horse, but it cannot capture (nor be captured by) the red cannon in the other palace. The right red cannon cannot capture the blue chariot either. Unlike xiangqi, janggi requires cannons to jump to move, as well as capture. This means in the starting position, there are no valid moves available for the cannon.

==== Soldiers ====

These are labelled byeong 병 (兵) (soldiers, general term for a soldier) for Red and jol 졸 (卒) (also means soldiers, usually lowest ranking soldiers) for Blue. Each side has five soldiers, initially placed on alternating points, one row back from the edge of where the river would be in xiangqi. Unlike pawns in Western chess, they move and capture one point either straight forward or sideways (unlike xiangqi, where soldiers must cross the "river" to be able to move sideways.) There is no promotion; once they reach the end of the board they may only move sideways. Soldiers may also move one point diagonally forward along the diagonal lines of the enemy palace.

=== Setting up ===
In tournaments, the elder player, or higher ranked player, conceals a soldier from each side in their hands. The opponent selects a hand to determine their color. After that, Han places their pieces first, followed by Cho placing theirs. (The reason both sides are not placed simultaneously is because the positions of horse and elephant can be transposed, giving some strategical advantage to the player who places last.)

There are four or five possible setups. They are basically named after the relative position of elephant.

Inner Elephant Setup

Outer Elephant Setup

Right Elephant Setup

Left Elephant Setup

Traditionally, there is the fifth, Central Chariot Setup, which is no longer used in modern tournament rule in South Korea, but may be still found in casual games or in North Korea.

Central Chariot Setup (only used in casual games and North Korea)

After the pieces are set up, Cho moves first.

=== Ending the game ===
The game is won by checkmating the opposing general. This is called weh-tong (외통).

In Western chess, stalemate is achieved when no legal moves are possible. However, stalemate effectively does not exist in janggi. The player must pass their turn when no legal moves are possible. If neither player can move legally, or if neither player can win because neither player has enough pieces, the game ends in a draw.

A player may decide to make a move such that their general faces the opponent's general unobstructed (a condition called bikjang 빅장). In this situation, the opponent can either call a draw, or make a move that breaks the condition. In many cases, the bikjang rule can be used to force the opponent to call a draw on a losing game, by forcing them to sacrifice a valuable piece to break the bikjang position. It may not apply in some games, and usually the players will consent on the validity of the rule before the game begins.

Check is announced by declaring janggun (將軍), meaning 'general'. Getting out of janggun is called meonggun, and one may declare meonggun while escaping from janggun. But it is not necessary to say janggun out loud.

=== Miscellaneous rules ===
In South Korean tournaments, according to rules set by the Korean Janggi Association, there is no draw in any form, including draw by perpetual check or repetition of position. If a position repeats three times, a referee is called to determine who is at fault. Usually the referee orders the player who is losing to make a different move, so the player who is winning can press for an advantage. Sometimes it is not technically clear who is to blame, and different referees may differ as to which player must deviate, or whether repetition is mutually forced. This rule is applied because a winner and a loser must be decided during the game. If both players have less than 30 piece points, however, a draw is allowed by both repetition and perpetual check.

In tournaments where draws are not allowed, draws are resolved by adding up the points of their pieces that are still on the board.

Piece	Points
chariots	13
cannons	7
horses	5
elephants	3
guards	3
soldiers	2

Because the player with the blue pieces (cho) starts, they have an advantage. To compensate for this, Red receives 1.5 points (called deom (덤; 點) in Korean), the half-point being to avoid ties. So when the game starts, Blue has 72 points and Red has 73.5 points. If neither side can force a win, the player with the most points is declared the winner.

== In South Korean culture ==
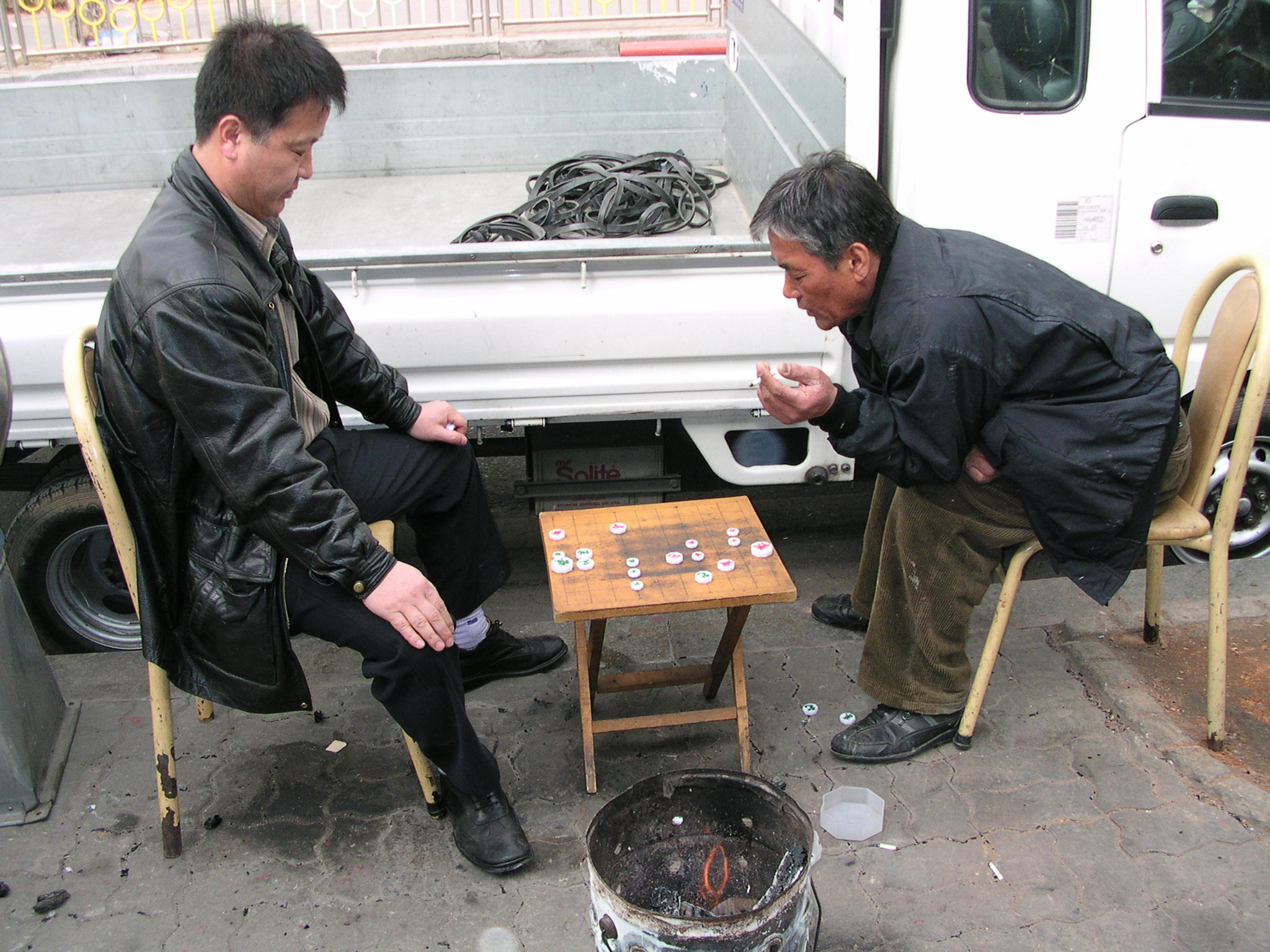
Playing janggi on Seoul's streets

In South Korea one will often see older men crowding around a single janggi board while two men play for small amounts of money. These games are played year round, especially in city parks in Seoul. Janggi is occasionally played as a gambling game, and it is currently less popular in South Korea than the strategy game baduk, known in the West as Go.

The Korea Janggi Association is responsible for promoting janggi in South Korea.

== Westernized variant ==
European janggi board

Position: A10 black chariot, B10 black horse, C10 black elephant, D10 black guard, F10 black guard, G10 black elephant, H10 black horse, I10 black chariot, E9 black general, B8 black cannon, H8 black cannon, A7 black soldier, C7 black soldier, E7 black soldier, G7 black soldier, I7 black soldier, A4 white soldier, C4 white soldier, E4 white soldier, G4 white soldier, I4 white soldier, B3 white cannon, H3 white cannon, E2 white general, A1 white chariot, B1 white horse, C1 white elephant, D1 white guard, F1 white guard, G1 white elephant, H1 white horse, I1 white chariot

Similar to European xiangqi, the same is possible for janggi, with a board of 9×10 cells.

== See also ==
- List of janggi variants
  - Gwangsanghui (廣象戱, 광상희) – an 18th-century janggi variant
- Xiangqi
- Shogi
