= Chesquerque =

Variant of chess

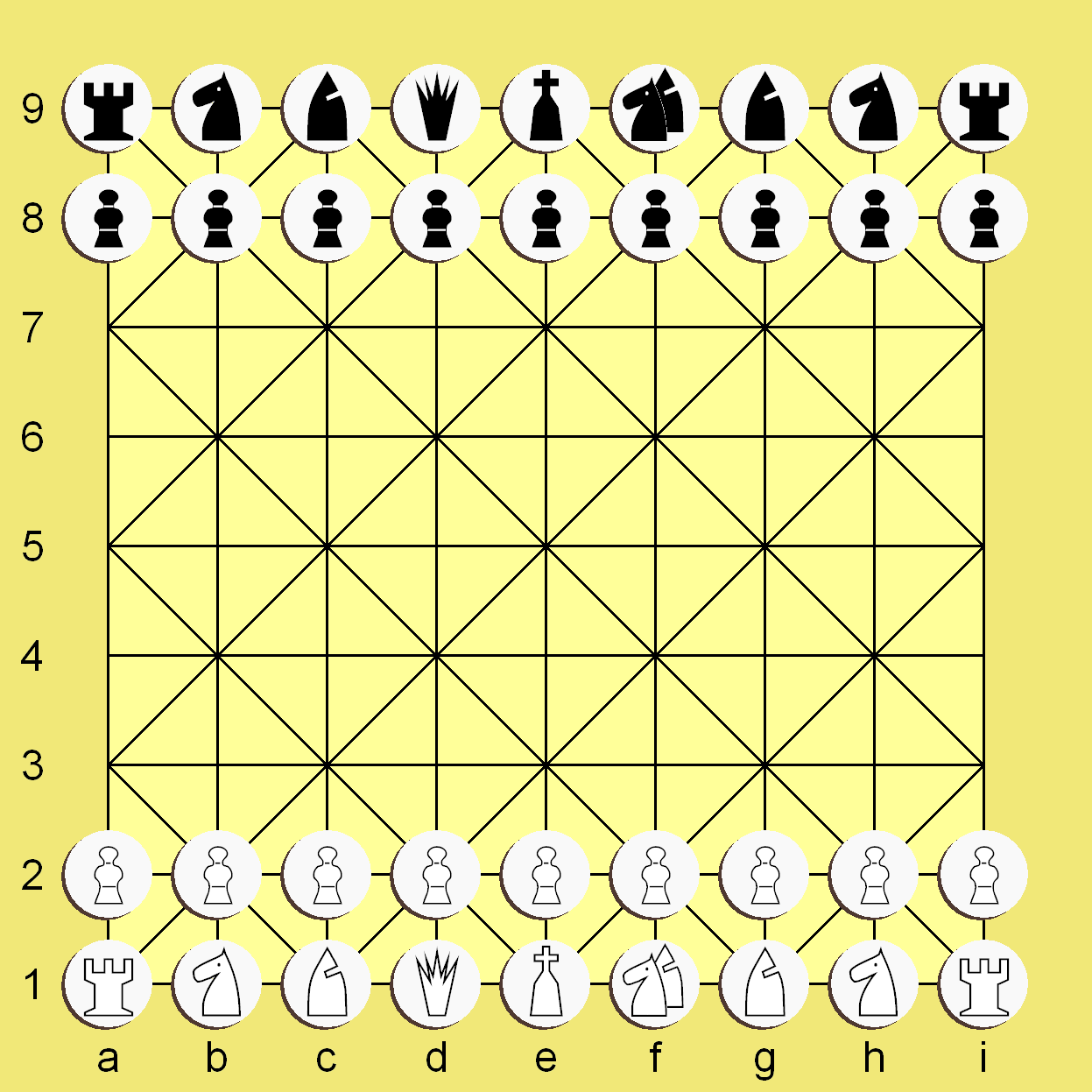
Chesquerque gameboard and starting position. In the diagram, archbishops are represented by knight and bishop combined.

Chesquerque is a chess variant invented by George R. Dekle Sr. in 1986. The game is played on a board composed of four Alquerque boards combined into a square. Like Alquerque, pieces are positioned on points of intersection and make their moves along marked lines (similarly to xiangqi); as such, the board comprises a 9×9 grid with 81 positions (points) that pieces can move to.

Chesquerque was included in World Game Review No. 10 edited by Michael Keller.

== Game rules ==
The dimensions of the board are 9 rows by 9 columns. All the standard chess pieces are present, plus one additional pawn and one archbishop fairy piece per side. The pieces move in ways specially adapted to the Alquerque-gridded board; these moves differ slightly from those in regular chess.

The starting setup is shown above. Like in standard chess, White moves first and the objective of the game is to checkmate the opponent's king. Other standard chess conventions also apply.

=== Piece moves ===
Each chesquerque piece has two different sets of possible valid moves, depending on whether said piece is standing on a point that has one or more diagonal connections ("with diagonals") or one that has no diagonal connections ("without diagonals"). In general pieces cannot move diagonally from points without diagonal markings.

Piece movements described using Betza's notation
Piece type	On points without diagonals	On points with diagonals
King	W	KimsO3
Queen	R	RB
Rook	R	RF
Bishop	W	BW
Knight	t[WF]	t[FW]
Archbishop	Wt[WF]	BWt[FW]
Pawn	fWimfnD	mfWcefFimfnD

- A rook can move orthogonally any number of points in a straight line, as in standard chess. On a point with diagonals, though, a rook can also move one step diagonally. (Note: This is the move of the dragon king in shogi.)
- A bishop, on a point with diagonals, can move diagonally any number of points in a straight line. A bishop can also move one step orthogonally (on any point). (Note: A This is the move of the dragon horse in shogi.)
- The queen combines the powers of a chesquerque rook and a chesquerque bishop: i.e. it can move any number of points in a straight line, in any available direction along marked lines.
- The king moves one step as a chesquerque queen: i.e. it can move one step in any direction along marked lines.
  - In castling moves, the king always slides three points' distance (whether castling queenside or "archbishop-side"); the corresponding rook moves two squares in the opposite direction.
- A knight can move in a similar way to a regular chess knight (described below), but unlike standard chess, a chesquerque knight may not jump over any pieces standing in the way:
  - On a point without diagonals, a knight moves in the following pattern: one step orthogonally (in any direction), then one step diagonally outward. (Note: This is the move of a horse in xiangqi.)
  - On a point with diagonals, a knight moves in the following pattern: one step diagonally (in any direction), then one step orthogonally outward. (Note: This could be described as the "inverse" of the move of a horse in xiangqi.)
- The archbishop combines the powers of a chesquerque bishop and a chesquerque knight. (Note that when making a knight's move, the archbishop still cannot jump over any piece that stands on an adjacent point; however, an enemy piece on such a point may be captured by a bishop's move.)
- A pawn has two types of moves:
  - On a point with diagonals, a pawn moves (without capturing) one step straight forward, and captures one step diagonally forward. (Note: This is the move of a pawn in standard chess.)
  - On a point without diagonals, a pawn moves and captures one step forward. (Note: This is the move of a pawn in shogi.)
  - As in standard chess, all pawns may optionally advance two steps straight forward on their first move (without capturing). En passant captures are also possible (but only against pawns that start on points without diagonals). Pawns are promoted at the last rank, and may be promoted to an archbishop as well.

=== Piece moves illustrated ===
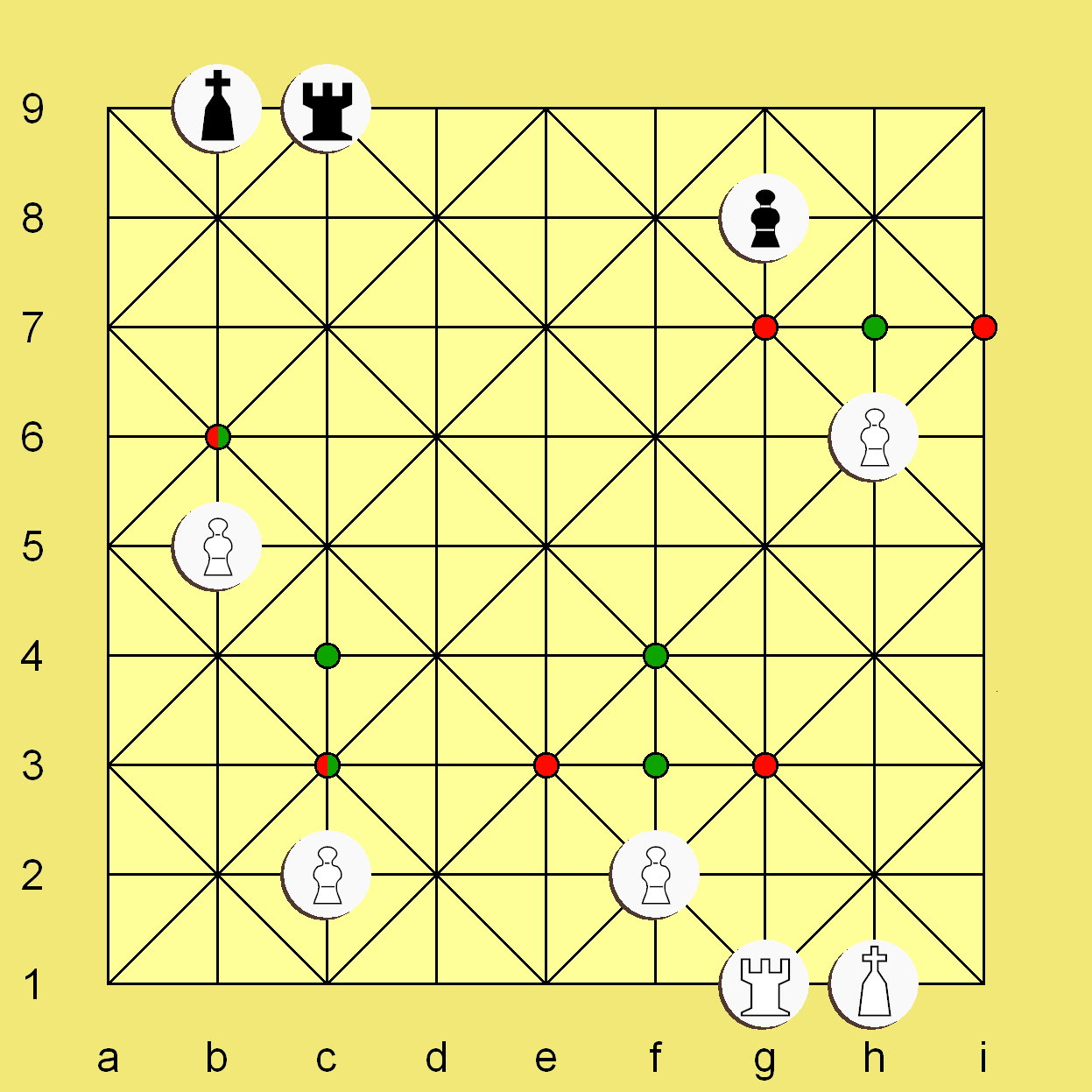
The white pawn on h6 can move one step straight forward (green dot), or capture diagonally forward (red dots). The pawn on b5 has no diagonal options; hence, it moves and captures one step forward (green–red dot). The same applies to White's pawns on f2 and c2 respectively; plus, those pawns have initial two-step options (furthest green dots). If Black's pawn on g8 advances, White can capture it en passant: 1... g6 2. hxg7 e.p.. In the diagram, White has castled "archbishop-side" (0-0), while Black has castled queenside (0-0-0).

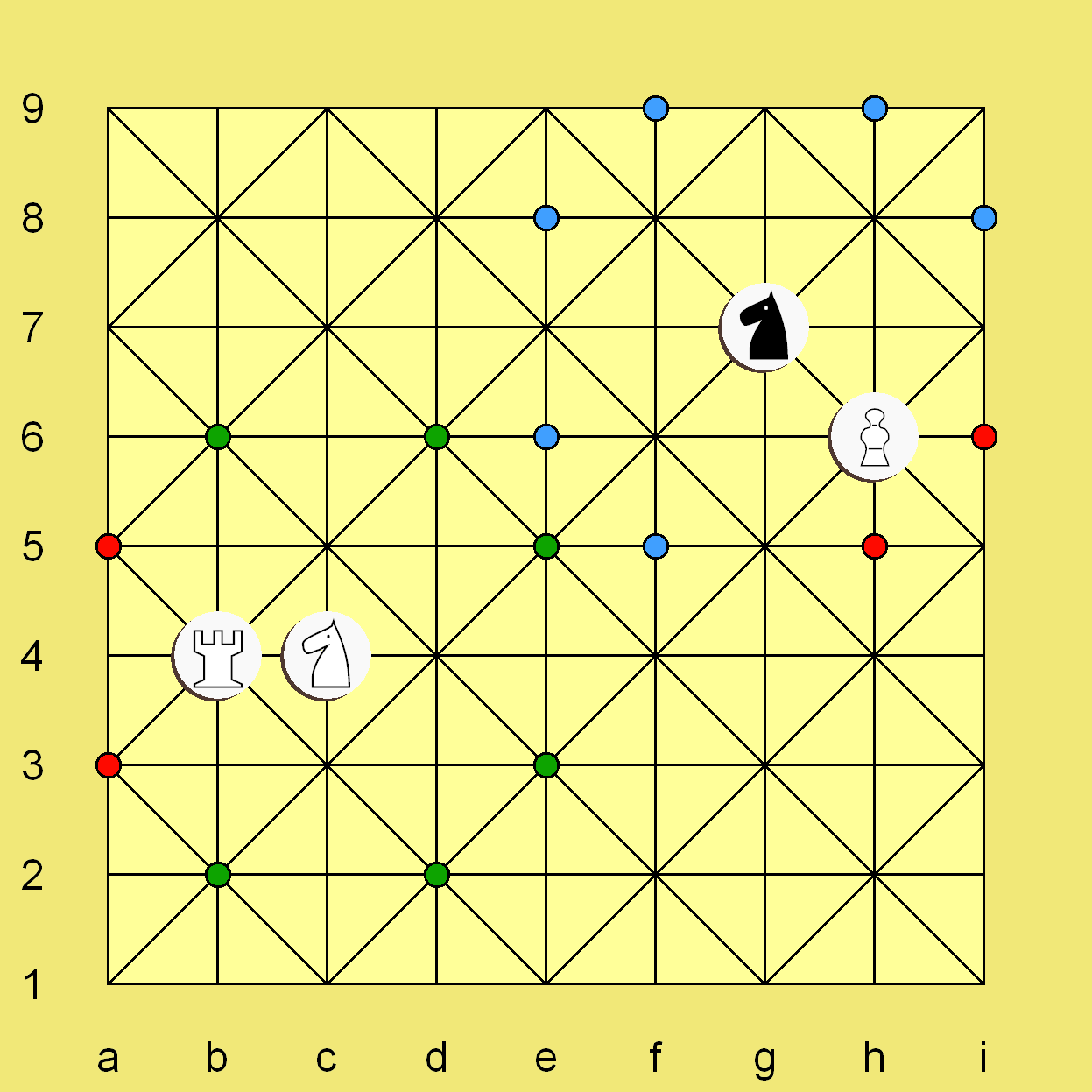
The white knight on c4 can move to any green dot, but cannot move to red dots near the rook, since the rook blocks those moves. The black knight on g7 is under attack and can retreat safely to any blue dot, but cannot move to red dots near the pawn, since the pawn blocks those moves.

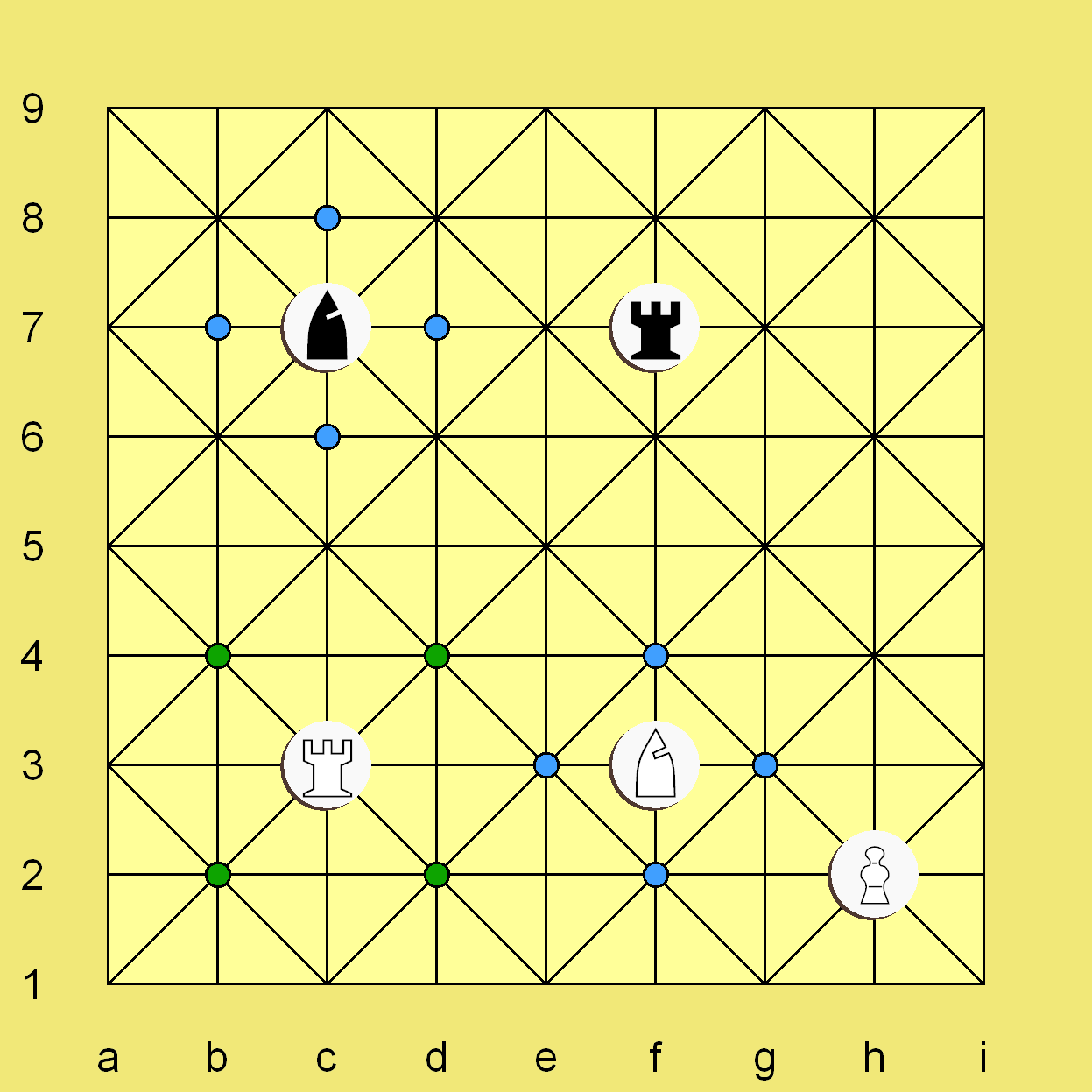
The white rook on c3 can move one step diagonally (green dots) in addition to moving on orthogonal lines (e.g., it can capture the black bishop). The black rook on f7 has no diagonal step available, but can move on orthogonal lines (it can capture the white bishop). The white bishop on f3 has no diagonal moves, but can move one step orthogonally (blue dots). The black bishop on c7 can move one step orthogonally (blue dots) in addition to moving on diagonal lines (it can capture the white pawn on h2).

== See also ==
- Alquerque
- Also by George Dekle:
  - Masonic Chess
  - Triangular Chess—a variant with triangular cells
  - Tri-Chess—a three-player variant with triangular cells, chancellors and cardinals
  - Trishogi—a shogi variant with triangular cells
  - Hexshogi—a shogi variant with hexagonal cells
