= Cross chess =

Chess variant

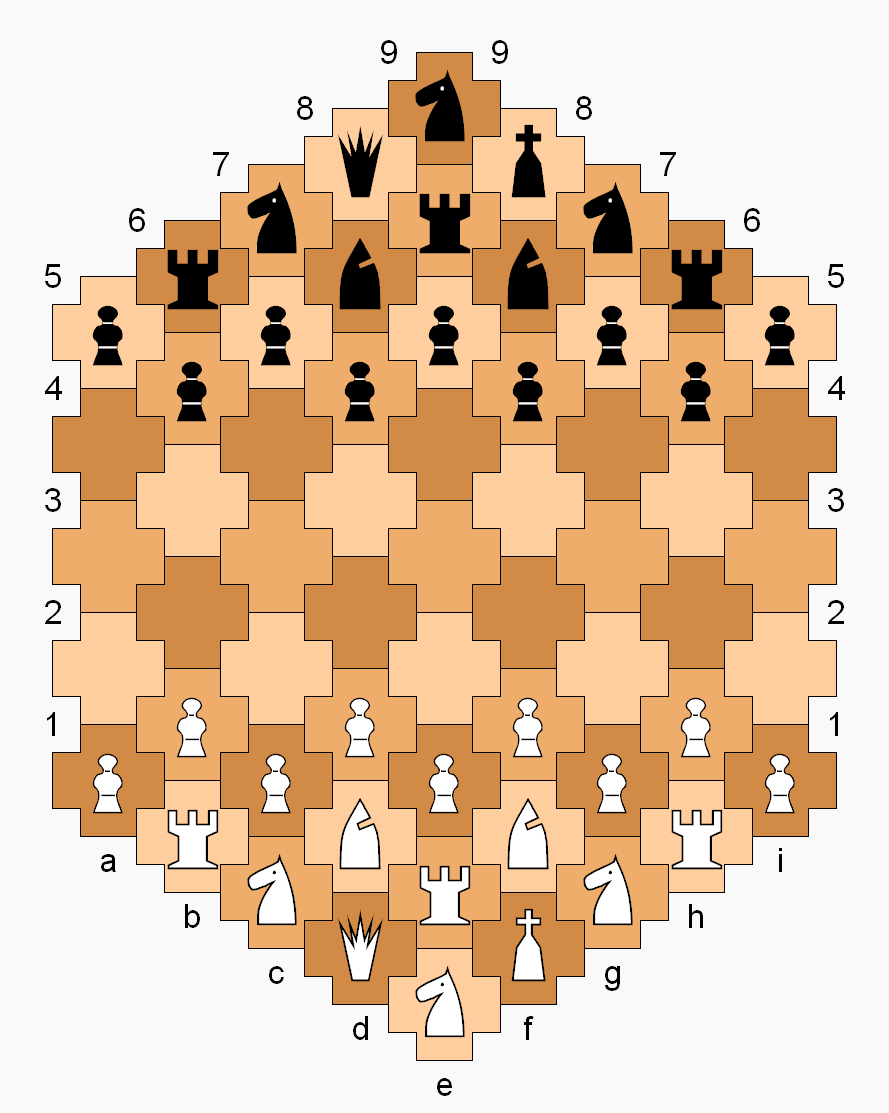
Cross Chess gameboard and starting position

Cross chess is a chess variant invented by George R. Dekle Sr. in 1982. The game is played on a board comprising 61 cross-shaped cells, with players each having an extra rook, knight, and pawn in addition to the standard number of chess pieces. Pieces move in the context of a gameboard with hexagonal cells, but Cross chess has its own definition of ranks and diagonals.

Cross chess was included in World Game Review No. 10 edited by Michael Keller.

== Hexagonal features ==
The cross chess board geometry has the same features as hexagon-based chessboards; however, diagonals and ranks are defined differently in cross chess from Gliński's and Shafran's hexagonal variants, resulting in move possibilities more akin to standard chess. (E.g., a bishop has six diagonal move directions in Glinski's hex chess, whereas a cross chess bishop has four directions; a rook has six directions in Glinski's, whereas along ranks and files on the cross chess board, it has four.) As with hex-based boards, three cell colors are used, but same-color cells highlight horizontal ranks on the cross chess board, not diagonals.

== Game rules ==
The diagram shows the starting setup. Special rank and diagonal paths determine how pieces move, as described below. Check, checkmate, and stalemate are as in standard chess. However a pawn has no initial two-step option, and a rook can make a one-step diagonal move. (Note: A provision that allows a rook to reach all nine files.)

=== Piece moves ===
- A bishop moves along diagonals – adjoining cells in straight lines 33.69 degrees from the horizontal. (Four possible directions.)
- A rook moves vertically along files (two directions) and horizontally (two directions) along ranks – cells of the same color in a horizontal line. In addition, a rook may make a one-step diagonal move. (Note: A cross chess rook moves the same as the dragon king in shogi.)
- The queen moves as a rook and bishop. (Eight directions.)
- The king moves one step as a queen. A player may castle either kingside (0-0) or queenside (0-0-0). In each case the king shifts to the cell occupied by the castling rook, with the rook shifting to the cell on opposite side and adjacent to the king. Normal castling conventions apply.
- A knight moves in the pattern: one step on a file or rank, then one step diagonally outward. (Or vice versa: one step diagonally, then one step on a file or rank in an outward direction.) A knight leaps any intervening men.
- A pawn moves one step straight forward on a file, with no initial two-step option. A pawn captures one step diagonally forward. Promotion occurs at the furthest cell on a file.

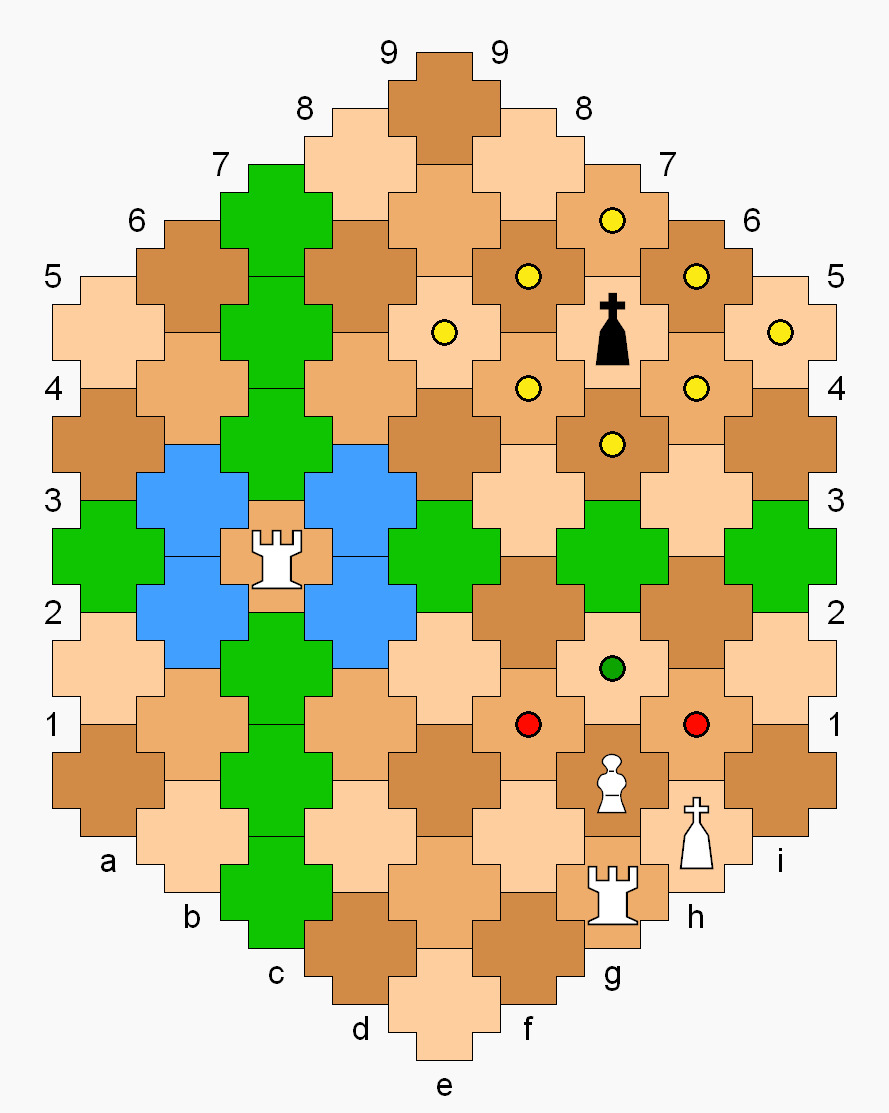
The rook on c4 can move to any green-colored cell in the diagram (its file and rank) or any blue-colored cell (one diagonal step). The pawn on g2 can move to the cell with green dot or capture on a red dot. The black king can move to yellow dots. White has castled kingside.

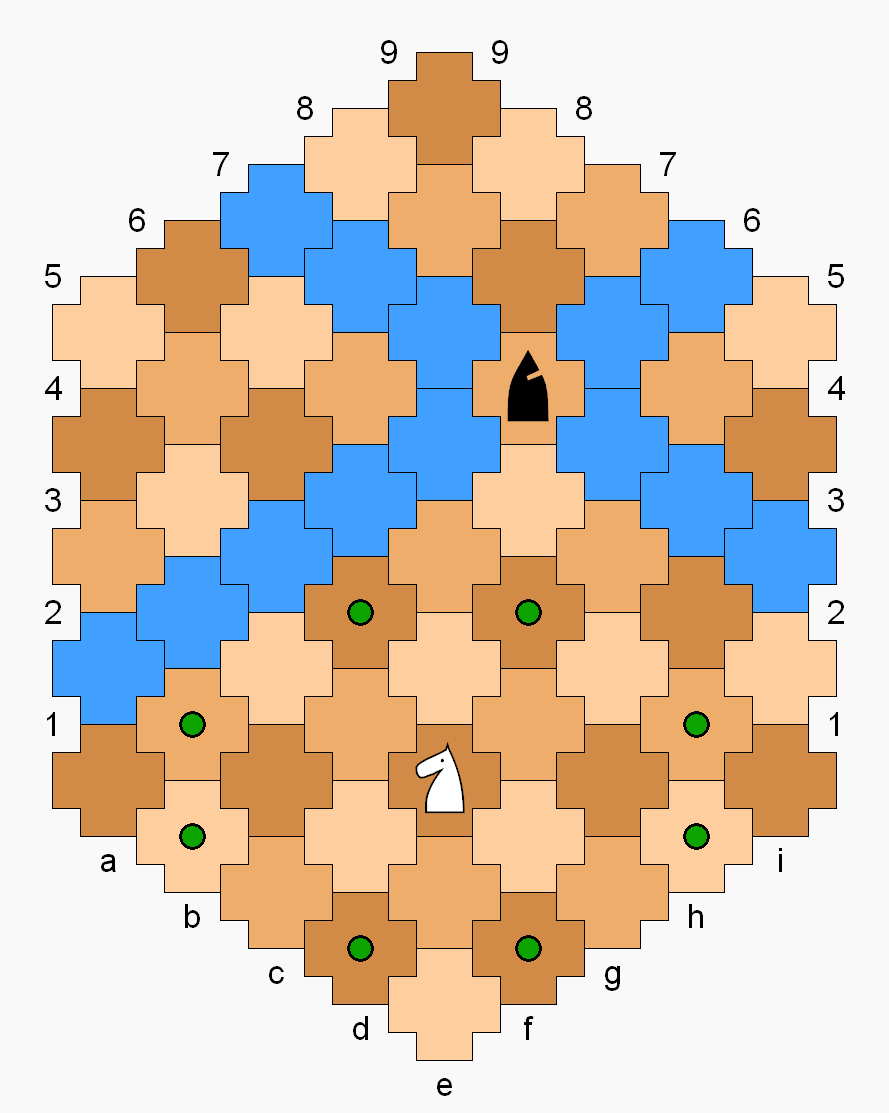
The bishop can move to any blue-colored cell in the diagram (its diagonals). The knight can move to any green dot.

== See also ==
- Hexagonal chess
- Also by George Dekle:
  - Masonic chess
  - Triangular chess – a variant using a hexagonal board with triangular cells
  - Hexshogi – a shogi variant with hexagonal cells
