= Quatrochess =

Chess variant

	a	b	c	d	e	f	g	h	i	j	k	l	m	n
14	a14 k r	b14 B r	c14 c r	d14 r r	e14 p r	f14	g14	h14	i14	j14 black pawn	k14 black rook	l14 black queen	m14 black upside-down rook	n14 black king	14
13	a13 m r	b13 N r	c13 G r	d13 n r	e13 p r	f13	g13	h13	i13	j13 black pawn	k13 black knight	l13 black giraffe	m13 N d	n13 B d	13
12	a12 q r	b12 G r	c12 N r	d12 a r	e12 p r	f12	g12	h12	i12	j12 black pawn	k12 black bishop	l12 N d	m12 black giraffe	n12 black empress	12
11	a11 r r	b11 n r	c11 b r	d11 b r	e11 p r	f11	g11	h11	i11	j11 black pawn	k11 black bishop	l11 black princess	m11 black knight	n11 black rook	11
10	a10 p r	b10 p r	c10 p r	d10 p r	e10 f r	f10	g10	h10	i10	j10 black upside-down king	k10 black pawn	l10 black pawn	m10 black pawn	n10 black pawn	10
9	a9	b9	c9	d9	e9	f9	g9	h9	i9	j9	k9	l9	m9	n9	9
8	a8	b8	c8	d8	e8	f8	g8 w w	h8 w w	i8	j8	k8	l8	m8	n8	8
7	a7	b7	c7	d7	e7	f7	g7 w w	h7 w w	i7	j7	k7	l7	m7	n7	7
6	a6	b6	c6	d6	e6	f6	g6	h6	i6	j6	k6	l6	m6	n6	6
5	a5 white pawn	b5 white pawn	c5 white pawn	d5 white pawn	e5 white upside-down king	f5	g5	h5	i5	j5 f g	k5 p g	l5 p g	m5 p g	n5 p g	5
4	a4 white rook	b4 white knight	c4 white princess	d4 white bishop	e4 white pawn	f4	g4	h4	i4	j4 p g	k4 b g	l4 b g	m4 n g	n4 r g	4
3	a3 white empress	b3 white giraffe	c3 N l	d3 white bishop	e3 white pawn	f3	g3	h3	i3	j3 p g	k3 a g	l3 N g	m3 G g	n3 q g	3
2	a2 B l	b2 N l	c2 white giraffe	d2 white knight	e2 white pawn	f2	g2	h2	i2	j2 p g	k2 n g	l2 G g	m2 N g	n2 m g	2
1	a1 white king	b1 white upside-down rook	c1 white queen	d1 white rook	e1 white pawn	f1	g1	h1	i1	j1 p g	k1 r g	l1 c g	m1 B g	n1 k g	1
	a	b	c	d	e	f	g	h	i	j	k	l	m	n

Quatrochess gameboard and starting position. In the diagram, standard pieces have their usual representations, as well as fairy pieces chancellor, archbishop, and giraffe. A mann is represented by an inverted king, wazir by inverted rook, ferz by inverted bishop, camel by inverted knight

Quatrochess is a chess variant for four players invented by George R. Dekle Sr. in 1986. It is played on a square 14×14 board that excludes the four central squares. Each player controls a standard set of sixteen chess pieces, and additionally nine fairy pieces. The game can be played in partnership (two opposing teams of two) or all-versus-all.

Quatrochess was included in World Game Review No. 10 edited by Michael Keller.

== Game rules ==
The illustration shows the starting setup. White moves first and play proceeds clockwise around the board. Teammates sit in opposite corners in partnership games.

The squareless center may not be moved to or through; however, it may be jumped over by pieces that leap (knight, chancellor, archbishop, camel, and giraffe). The king, queen, rook, bishop, knight, and pawn move and capture as they do in chess. Each player's eight pawns are divided into two groups of four: one group moves forward along files, the other along ranks. As in chess, pawns have an initial two-step option, en passant is possible, and promotion occurs at the board's end. There is no castling in Quatrochess.

=== Fairy piece moves ===
The fairy pieces all capture the same as they move:

- The chancellor moves as a chess rook and knight.
- The archbishop moves as a chess bishop and knight.
- The mann moves as a chess king, but has no royal power.
- The wazir moves one step orthogonally in any direction.
- The ferz moves one step diagonally in any direction.
- The camel leaps in a (1,3) pattern like an elongated knight's move. It jumps over any intervening men.
- The giraffe leaps in a (1,4) pattern like an elongated knight's move. It jumps over any intervening men.

=== Winning ===
When a player is checkmated or stalemated, that player's king is immediately removed from the game and all remaining men of its color become the property of the player delivering the mate or stalemate (all-versus-all game), or teammate (partnership game). The last surviving player (or team) is the winner.

== See also ==
- Four-player chess
- Also by George Dekle:
  - Tri-Chess – a three-player variant with triangular cells, chancellors and cardinals
  - Three-Man Chess – a three-player variant with quadrilateral cells
