= Tri-chess =

Chess variant for three players

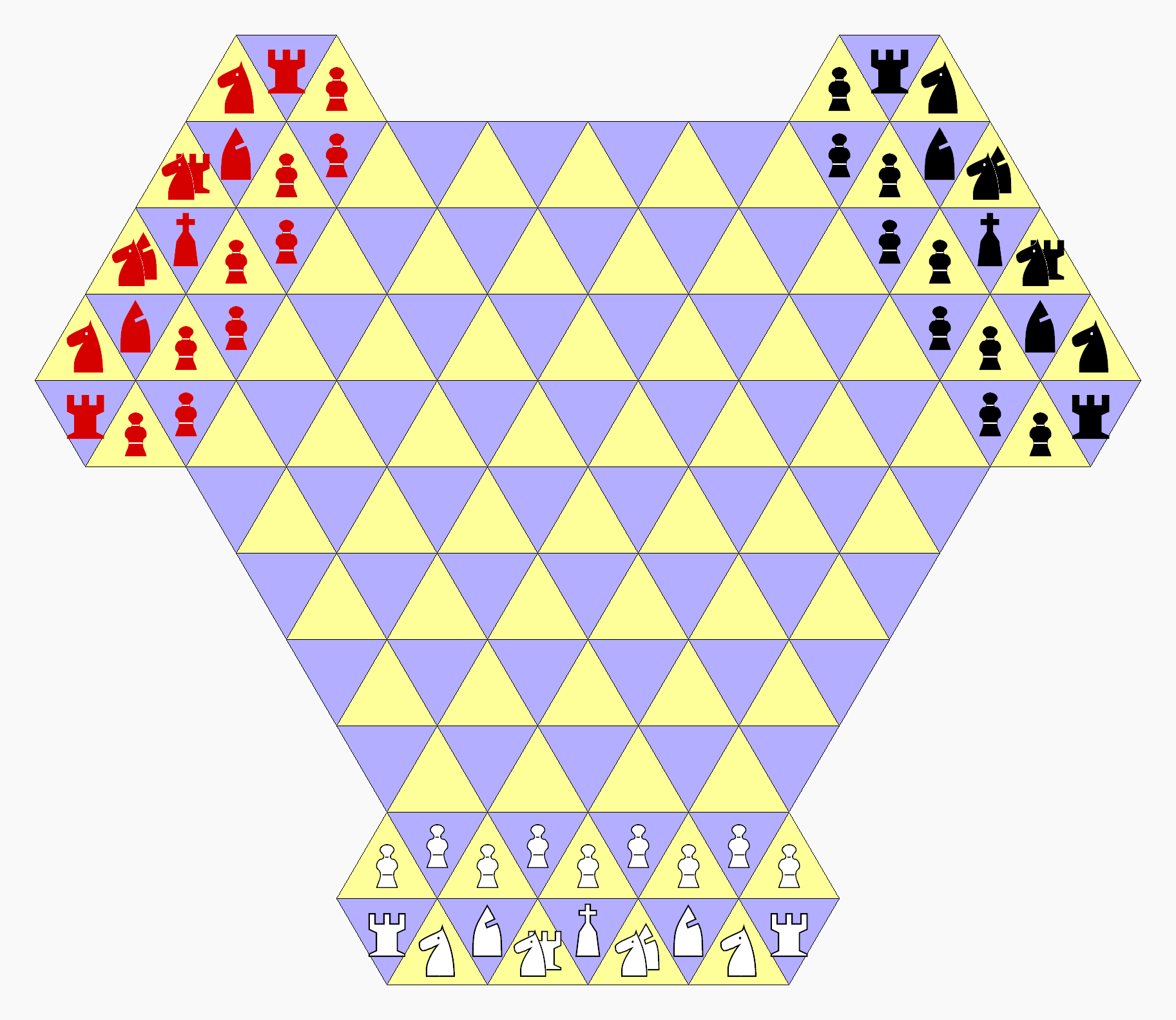
Tri-chess gameboard and starting position. In the diagram, chancellors are represented by rook and knight combined; cardinals are represented by bishop and knight combined.

Tri-chess is the name of a chess variant for three players invented by George R. Dekle Sr. in 1986. The game is played on a board comprising 150 triangular cells. The standard chess pieces are present, minus the queens, and plus the chancellor and cardinal compound fairy pieces per side.

Tri-chess was included in World Game Review No. 10 edited by Michael Keller.

== Game rules ==
The illustration shows the starting setup. White moves first and play proceeds clockwise around the board. When a player is checkmated or stalemated, their king is immediately removed from the game and their remaining pieces become under control of the player delivering the checkmate or stalemate. Pawns of appropriated armies do not change their direction of movement toward promotion. The last surviving player wins the game.

=== Piece moves ===
- A bishop moves as the bishop in the tri-chess two-player game. (Namely, in six directions constituting board diagonals.)
- A rook moves as the rook in the tri-chess two-player game. (Namely, in six directions along horizontal ranks or oblique files.)
- A knight moves in the pattern: two steps as a bishop, then one step as a rook in an orthogonal direction. A knight leaps any intervening men.
- The chancellor moves as a rook and knight.
- The cardinal moves as a bishop and knight.
- The king moves as the king in the tri-chess two-player game. (Namely, one step as a bishop or two steps as a rook.) The king slides three cells whether castling "cardinal-side" or "chancellor-side".
- A pawn moves and captures as a pawn in triangular chess. (Namely, straight forward one step at a time, whether crossing a cell edge or vertex. On its first move it may optionally move two steps straight forward. A pawn captures to either cell adjoining the cell immediately in front, in the same rank.)

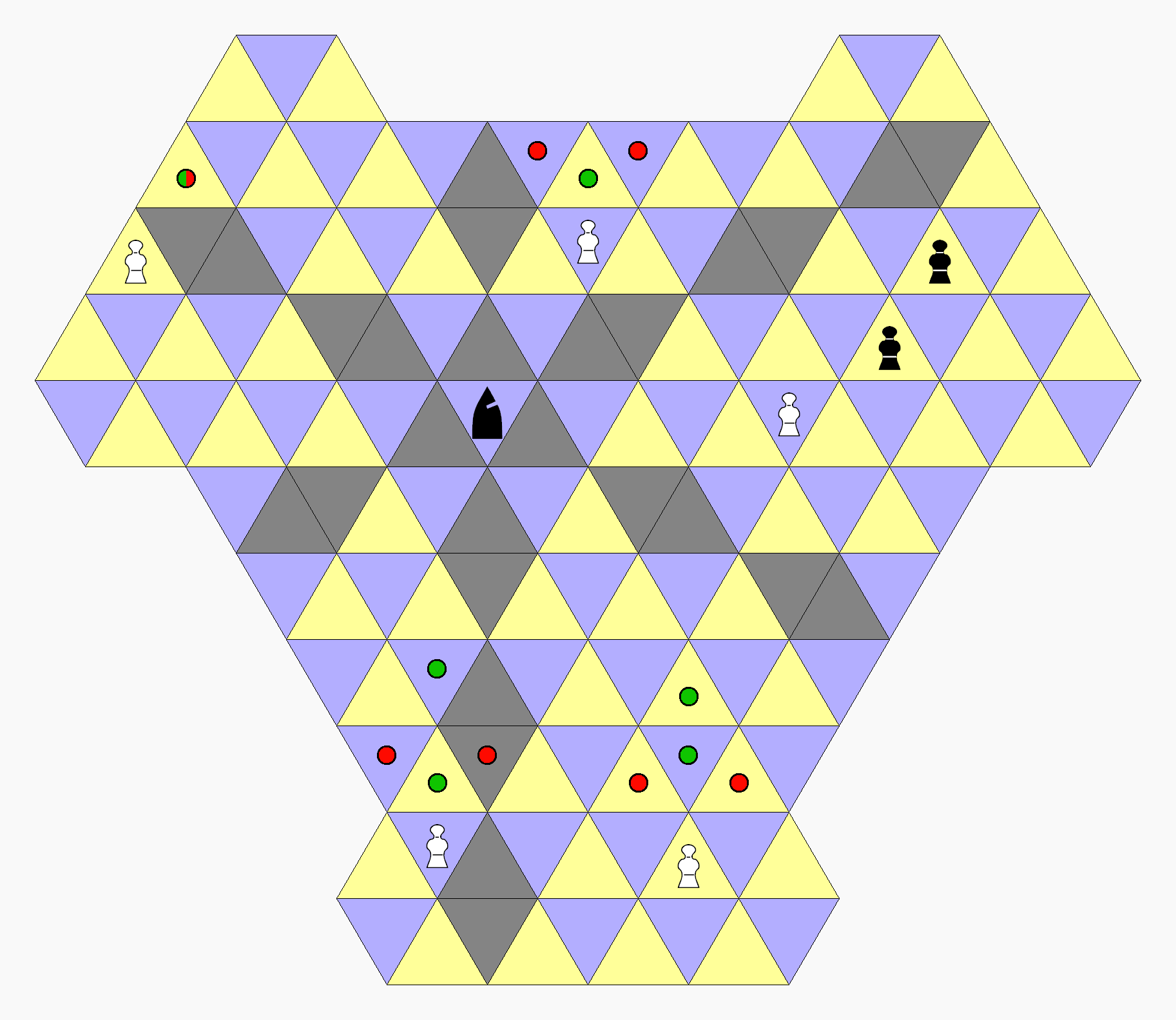
The bishop moves along cells in the diagram colored dark gray. The white pawns can move to cells marked with green dots, or capture on red dots. White promotes on any cell on the 10th rank of the board. In the diagram, White's pawn on the 7th rank blocks Black's pawn on the 8th from moving forward. If the black pawn on White's 9th rank advances, the white pawn can capture it, for example: by e.p.

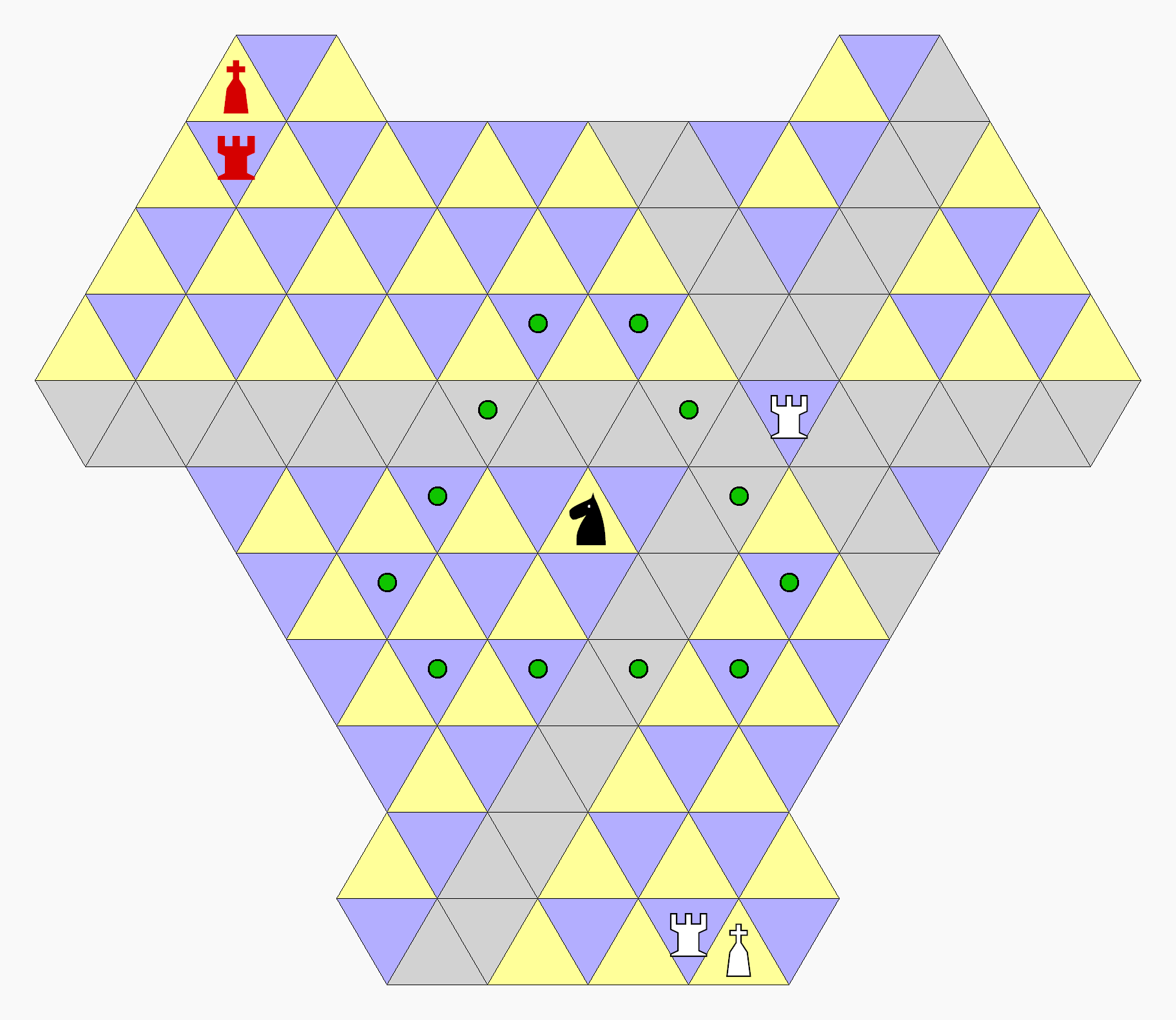
The rook moves along cells in the diagram colored light gray. The knight can move to green dots. Red has castled "chancellor-side"; White has castled "cardinal-side".

== See also ==
- Three-player chess
- Also by George Dekle:
  - Three-man chess
  - Triangular chess – a two-player variant with triangular cells
  - Trishogi – a two-player shogi variant with triangular cells
