= Masonic shogi =

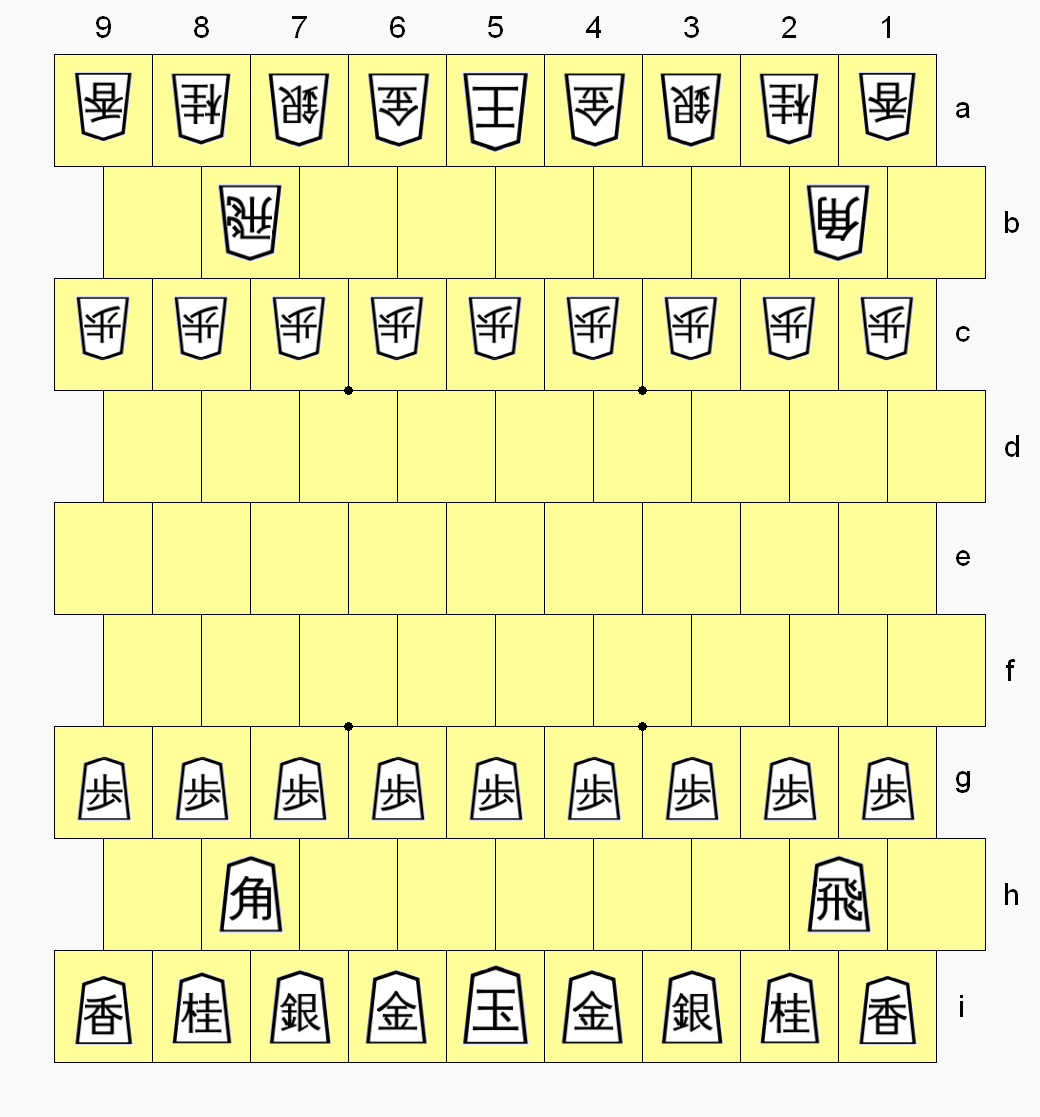
Masonic Shogi gameboard and starting position

Masonic shogi is a shogi variant invented by George R. Dekle Sr. in 1987. The game is played on a modified shogi board whereby alternating ranks are indented to the right—resembling masonry brickwork. The moves of pieces are adapted to the new geometry; in other respects the game is the same as shogi.

Masonic shogi was included in World Game Review No. 10 edited by Michael Keller.

== Board characteristics ==
Indentation of alternating ranks results in cants (oblique files) approximately 30 degrees from the vertical and diagonals approximately 30 degrees from the horizontal, the same as hexagon-based chessboards when cell vertices face the players. (For example, rooks have six directions of movement. Masonic bishops, however, are limited to the four diagonal directions to the sides.)

== Game rules ==
All normal shogi rules apply, including initial setup (see diagram), drops, promotion, and so on. The pieces, however, have specially defined moves.

=== Piece moves ===
The diagrams show how the unpromoted pieces move. As in shogi, a dragon king (promoted rook) moves as a rook or as a king. A dragon horse (promoted bishop) moves as a bishop or a king.

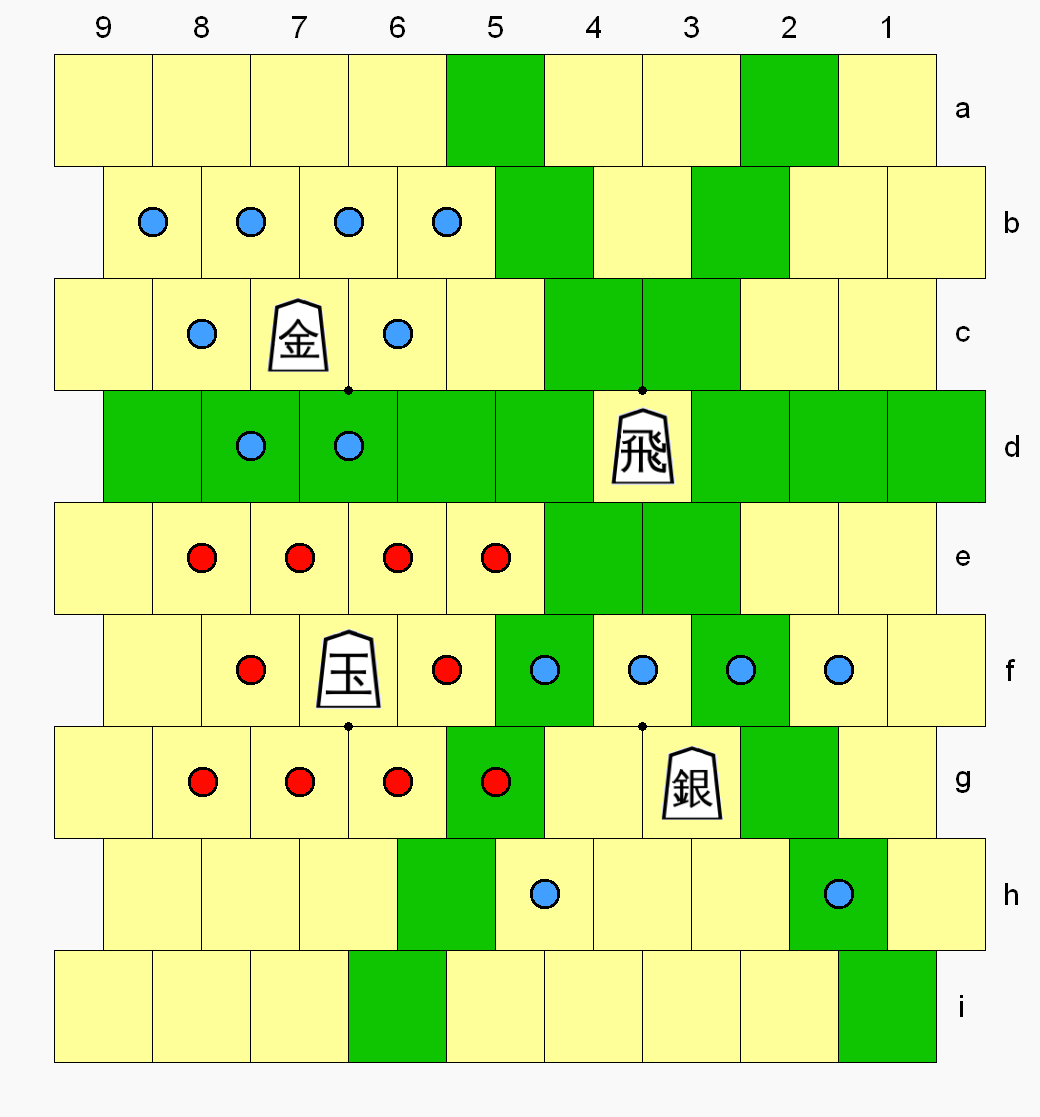
The rook (4d) moves along a rank (two directions) or cants (four directions) to any green-colored cell in the diagram. (Note: The Masonic rook has the same movement as the rook in Gliński's hexagonal chess (Pritchard 2007:260).) The king (7f) moves one step in any direction (red-colored dots). The gold general (7c) moves one step like a rook in any direction, or one step diagonally forward (blue dots). The silver general (3g) moves one step diagonally in any direction, or one step forward on a cant (blue dots).

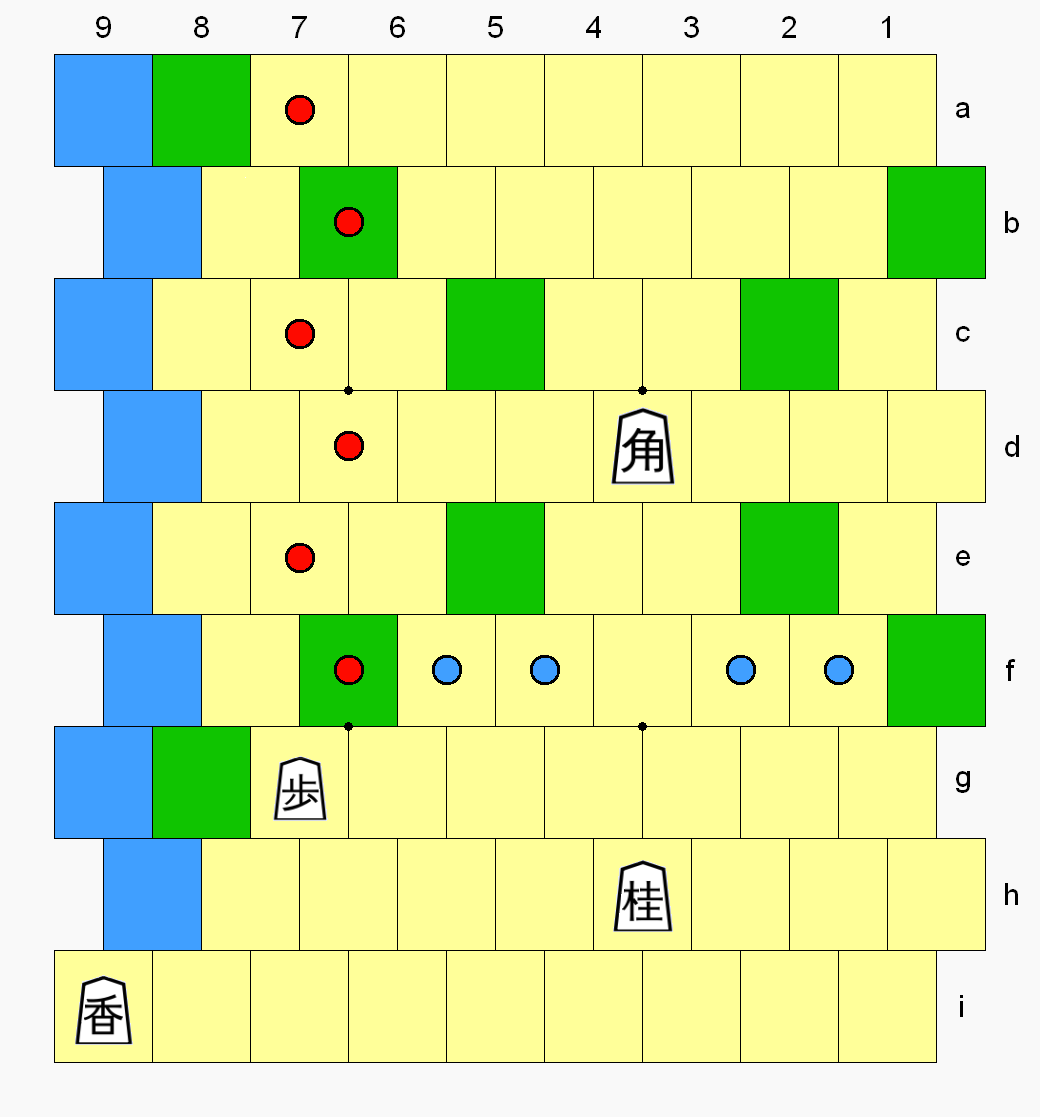
The bishop (4d) moves in four directions along board diagonals (to any green-colored cell). It is restricted to one third of the board before promotion. The lance (9i) moves forward only, in alternating cant directions (any blue-colored cell). The knight (4h) has four move options (blue dots) and moves in the pattern: one step forward on a cant, then one step forward diagonally. As in shogi, the knight leaps any intervening men. The pawn (7g) moves forward in the same pattern as the lance (red dots), but one step at a time.

== See also ==
- De Vasa's hexagonal chess
- Also by George Dekle:
  - Masonic Chess
  - Hexshogi – a variant with hexagonal cells
  - Trishogi – a variant with triangular cells
  - Space Shogi – a 3D variant
