= Triangular chess =

Group of chess variants

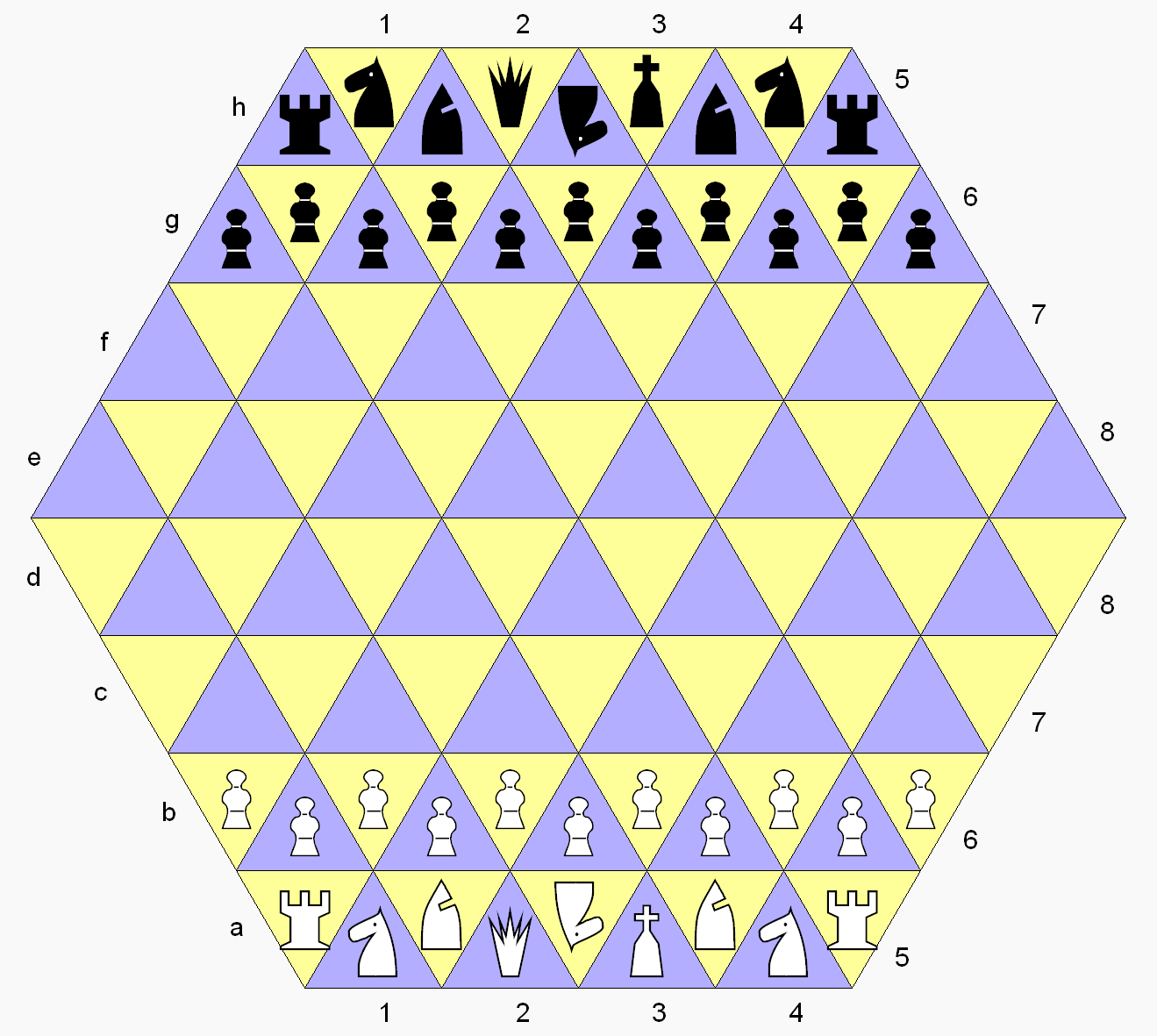
Triangular Chess and Tri-Chess gameboard and starting position

Triangular chess refers to a group of chess variants played on boards composed of triangular cells.

The best known is a chess variant for two players, Triangular Chess, invented by George R. Dekle Sr. in 1986. Dekle made another variation including fairy pieces which is called Tri-Chess. These two two-player games were included in World Game Review No. 10 edited by Michael Keller.

Guide to Ilshat Tagiev's three-player chess (click image for extensive pdf rules tutorial) (in Russian)

Russian Ilshat Tagiev, who introduced a "neutrality rule" to three-player chess in the mid-2000s, took out a patent for a three-person variant of triangular chess on a hexagonal board in 2009.

== See also ==
- Hexagonal chess
- Trishogi—a shogi variant with triangular cells
