= George R. Dekle Sr. =

American lawyer, professor, and author

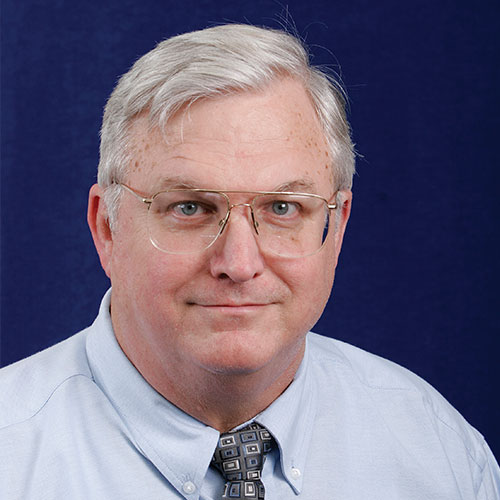
- Dekle in 2006
- Born: George Robert Dekle; May 23, 1948 (age 78); Gainesville, Florida, U.S.
- Education: University of Florida (BA, JD)
- Occupations: Legal Skills Professor, UF, Levin College of Law; writer
- Known for: Lead prosecutor in the Orlando Ted Bundy murder trial
- Notable work: The Last Murder: The Investigation, Prosecution, and Execution of Ted Bundy (2011)
- Spouse: Lane Dicks (m. 1972)
- Children: 3
- Parent(s): Donald James & Anne Coleman Dekle
- Website: www.bobdeklebooks.com; bobdekle.blogspot.com

George Robert "Bob" Dekle Sr. (born May 23, 1948) is an American lawyer who was an Assistant State Attorney in Florida's Third Judicial Circuit from 1975 through 2005. During this time, he served as lead prosecuting attorney in the 1980 Orlando murder trial of serial killer Ted Bundy, which ultimately delivered the death penalty that was carried out in 1989. Dekle's book on the case, The Last Murder: The Investigation, Prosecution, and Execution of Ted Bundy, was published in 2011.

Dekle served as a Legal Skills Professor at Levin College of Law, University of Florida, from 2006 through June 2016. He writes books on trial advocacy and legal history and has lectured extensively nationwide. Dekle is also a chess variant inventor.

== Early life ==
Dekle was born May 23, 1948, in Gainesville, Florida, the eldest child of Donald James and Anne Coleman Dekle. He has one brother, William Ervin Dekle, and one sister, Lucy Dekle Daniels. Dekle lived with his family on a farm in Lake Butler, Union County, Florida. Dekle's mother was a teacher; his father was a deputy in Lake Butler who had served in the Pacific theater as a US Marine during World War II and also a colonel with the Department of Corrections. Dekle's grandfather was a sheriff in Union County; his great-grandfather was a teacher and also a county judge. At the age of 9 or 10, Dekle was inspired about the possibility of a law career: while visiting a small town with his family, he saw a building with many books behind the picture window, and learned from his father that it was a law office. "Even at that age, I was a bookworm, and I thought it would be wonderful to have a job where you worked with so many books." In 7th or 8th grade, he skipped school to watch the closing arguments of a double murder trial in Lake Butler. "I came away knowing that I wanted to be three things: a lawyer, a trial lawyer, and a prosecutor."

In 1961 Dekle's family moved to Lake City, Florida, where he played defensive guard on the Lake City Columbia High School (CHS) football team.

== Education ==
After graduating from CHS in 1966, Dekle completed a Bachelor of Arts in history from the University of Florida (UF) in 1970. As a freshman in 1966 he played defensive tackle for the Florida Gators freshmen football team, which went 4–0 that season. After completing his BA he taught history at CHS for one year. Dekle then returned to UF and completed a Juris Doctor in 1973.

== Career ==
From 1973 to 1975, Dekle was Assistant Public Defender of the Third Judicial Circuit of Florida. He became Assistant State Attorney for the Third Circuit in 1975, serving 30 years until retiring in 2005. As Assistant State Attorney, Dekle investigated and prosecuted a wide variety of criminal cases. From 2006 through June 2016 he has been Legal Skills Professor at the University of Florida, Levin College of Law, overseeing the Prosecution Clinic.

Dekle has lectured extensively to prosecutor's associations nationwide. He has also served as faculty at the National Advocacy Center in Columbia, South Carolina. In an interview in 2016, Dekle summarized the hardest lesson he learned as a trial lawyer:

[...] you should try your case, not fight opposing counsel. Cordiality to opposing counsel usually makes it easier to try your case. Sometimes opposing counsel won't allow you to be cordial, but whenever you can you should try your case with an air of collegial professionalism.

and a lesson that he would like to pass on to new trial lawyers:

You have a job to do as a prosecutor, and sometimes the people and incidents you deal with aren't very pretty. But you should never lose sight of the fact that a prosecutor is a minister of justice, not a vigilante avenger.

=== State of Florida v. Theodore Robert Bundy ===
The trial of Ted Bundy in Orlando was the second murder trial of serial killer Bundy, who had previously been convicted and received two death sentences for two homicides in the Chi Omega proceedings in Miami in June 1979. The Orlando trial, for the February 9, 1978, abduction and first degree murder in Lake City of 12-year-old Kimberly Leach, the youngest and last Bundy victim, occurred six months later, from January to February 1980. Dekle led the prosecution team. Bundy was found guilty on all counts and was sentenced with death for a third time. After multiple stays of execution by the Eleventh Circuit Court of Appeals, and being upheld on appeal, the sentence was carried out nearly nine years later on January 24, 1989, by electrocution at Florida State Prison.

The Bundy case was Dekle's first Murder I prosecution. At age 30 and with three years experience as a prosecutor, he worked intensely on trial preparation from 1978 to 1980. He said, "That's where I learned to be a lawyer—prosecuting that case... It was such a vast-sprawling case that I had an opportunity to learn all kinds of aspects of criminal trial practice and all aspects of forensic science that probably would've taken years to learn about otherwise." Of the more than 350 jury trials in which Dekle had been lead counsel, the Bundy case was his most memorable. Fibers with an unusual manufacturing flaw allowed Dekle to connect Bundy's jacket to Bundy's van and to Kimberly Leach's body. The presentation of fiber evidence was the most memorable moment in Dekle's career as trial lawyer.

==== The Last Murder ====
In his book The Last Murder: The Investigation, Prosecution, and Execution of Ted Bundy, published May 2011, Dekle conveys that a successful third conviction in the circumstantial evidence case was anything but certain. He documents the enormous amount of work and preparation needed for the high-profile case, including the intricacies and complexities of investigation and prosecution, often across multiple states and jurisdictions. According to Hon. Michael D. Marcus (ret.), author of Trial Preparation for Prosecutors:

Dekle takes the reader "behind the scenes" to show that homicide investigations are arduous, unglamorous processes that can be sidetracked by both dead end leads and bureaucratic pettiness and that the resulting trials often experience unexpected legal and evidentiary potholes. Bundy's eventual conviction is a testament to dogged hard work by Dekle, his fellow prosecutors and assisting law enforcement.

Dekle's first objective for his book was to tell a Lake City story that "needed to be told". The book is an "easy read" according to Lake City Reporter publisher Todd Wilson, while also a detailed historical chronicle of events. Dekle credits numerous law enforcement agents, prosecutors, and investigators who worked closely on the case for contributing to its success. His second objective was "to offer guidance to any young prosecutor". The book is classified as a textbook. The 1980 case did not have the benefit of DNA testing, which was developed later. Dekle: "It is a case that would have been a slam dunk today because of DNA, but it is also a look at how to proceed with a capital case."

Dekle dedicated his book "To the memory of Kimberly Diane Leach."

=== Other cases ===
Dekle was also successful as lead prosecutor in other significant Murder I cases in Florida:

- State of Florida v. Marshall Lee Gore (Columbia County, 1980)
- State of Florida v. Richard Hamilton and Anthony Wainwright (Hamilton County, 1990)
- State of Florida v. Roger Harris (Columbia County, 2000)
- State of Florida v. Charles Globe (Columbia County, 2002)

== Recognitions ==
Dekle received awards of recognition from the Florida Prosecuting Attorneys Association (FPAA):

- Gene Berry Memorial Outstanding Prosecutor Award in Florida (1986)
- Distinguished Faculty Award (1996)
- Distinguished Faculty Award (2003)
- Lifetime Achievement Award for Distinguished Educational Service in Continuing Education for Prosecutors (2005)

== Civic and personal life ==
Sports: Dekle coached football in 1970 at his alma mater Columbia High School (CHS). He coached football for the Lake City Columbia County Boys' Club, Youth league. He also was President of CHS Wrestling Boosters Association.

Medical: Dekle has served on Florida Advisory Council on Emergency Medical Services, as well as on LCCC Advisory Committee on Emergency Medical Services, for which he was also Chairperson.

Church: Dekle was Sunday School Director for Eastside Baptist Church in Lake City, as well as budget committee Chairperson. He has also served as Chairperson of Deacons, and Trustee for the Lake City First Baptist Church.

Dekle married Lane Dicks in June 1971. Lane was a nursing instructor at Lake City Community College. Together they have one daughter, Laura (born 1972); and two sons, George (born 1975) and John Thomas (born 1978). John Thomas Dekle is a lawyer.

== Chess ==
Dekle began playing chess at age 5. He became a member of the Lake City Chess Club, as well as a certified USCF tournament director, and directed a few local tournaments. He became an avid international postal chess player, including games of shogi, and was an active member of NOST. (Note: NOST (kNights Of the Square Table), a (now defunct) correspondence game club formed in 1960 by Bob Lauzon and Jim France, enjoyed several hundred active members (Pritchard 1994:210).) Dekle has invented a number of chess variants and shogi variants which were published in D. B. Pritchard's two chess variant encyclopedias and included in Michael Keller's World Game Review. Many of his variants involve adaptations of chess or shogi to novel gameboards or board cell geometries. Dekle has also researched and written about chess history.

Chess variants

- Cross Chess (1982)
- Masonic Chess (1983)
- Three-Man Chess (1984)
- Chesquerque (1986)
- Chivalry Chess (1986)
- Coordinator Chess (1986)
- Custodian Chess (1986)
- Immobilizer Chess (1986)
- Lilliputian Chess (1986)
- Quatrochess (1986)
- Triangular Chess (1986)
- Tri-Chess (1986) 2-player
- Tri-Chess (1986) 3-player
- Withdrawer Chess (1986)
- Microchess (1987)

Shogi variants

- Hexshogi (1986)
- Masonic Shogi (1987)
- Space Shogi (1987)
- Trishogi (1987)
- Spherical Shogi (1988)

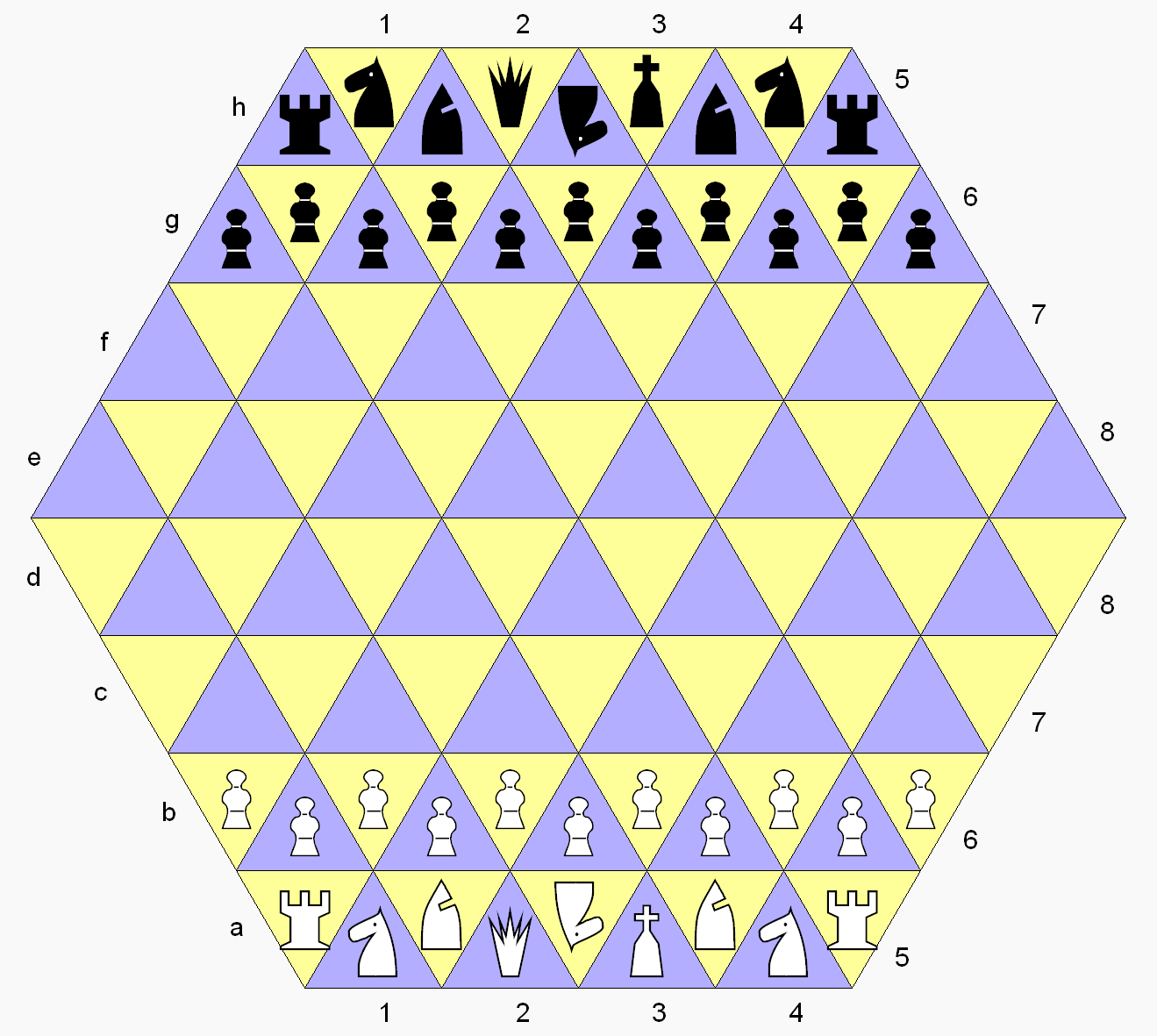
Triangular Chess

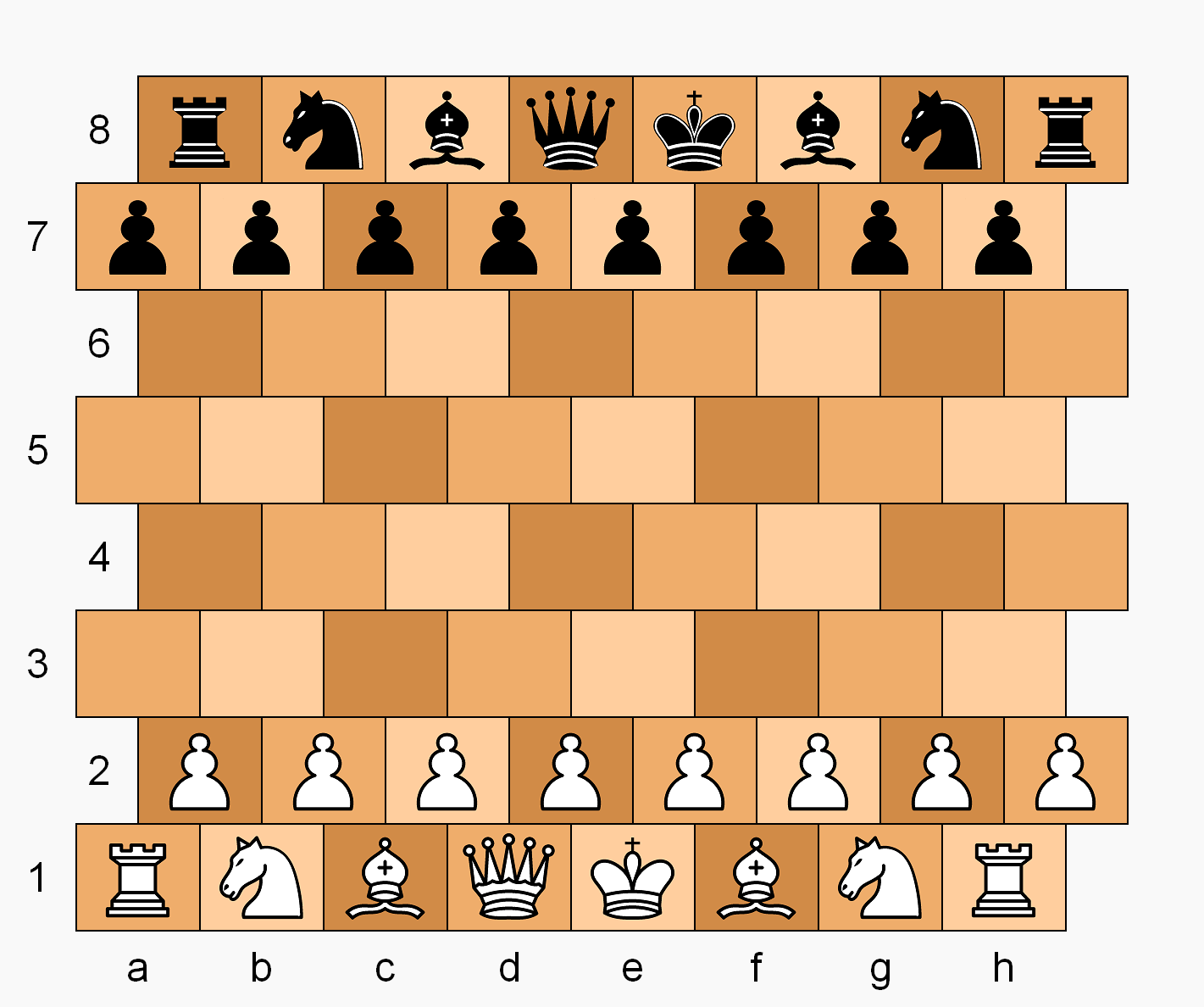
Masonic Chess

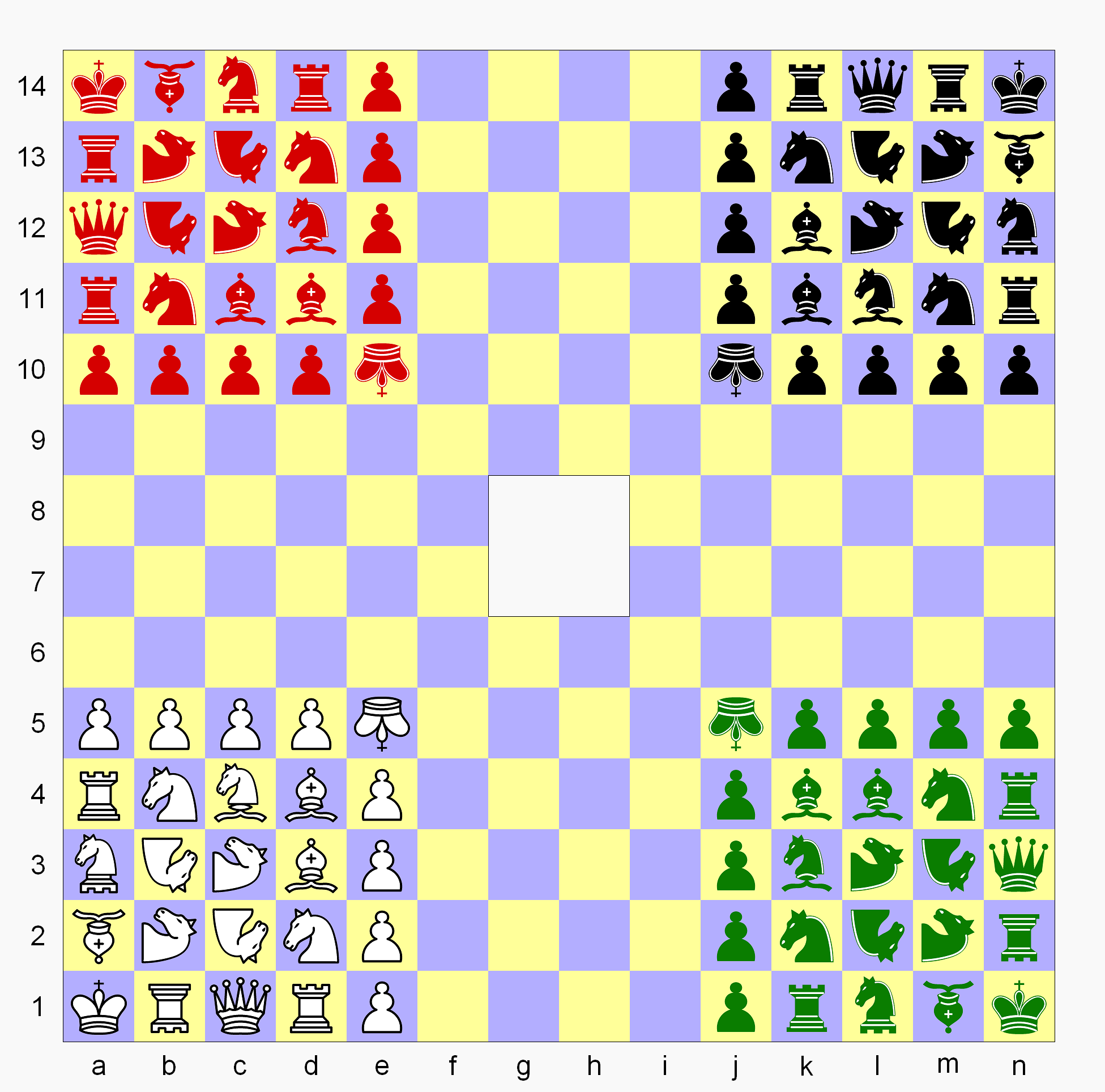
Quatrochess

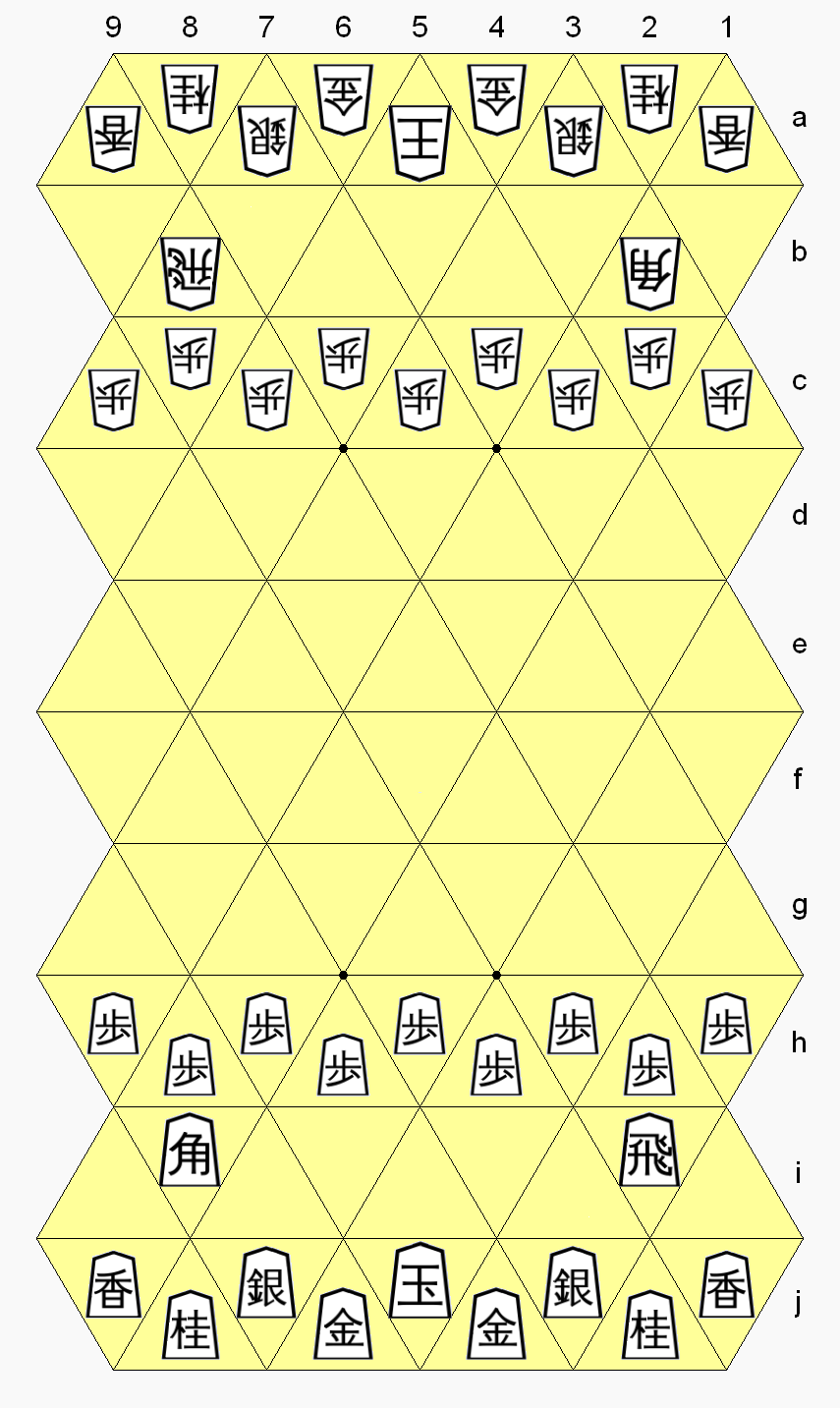
Trishogi

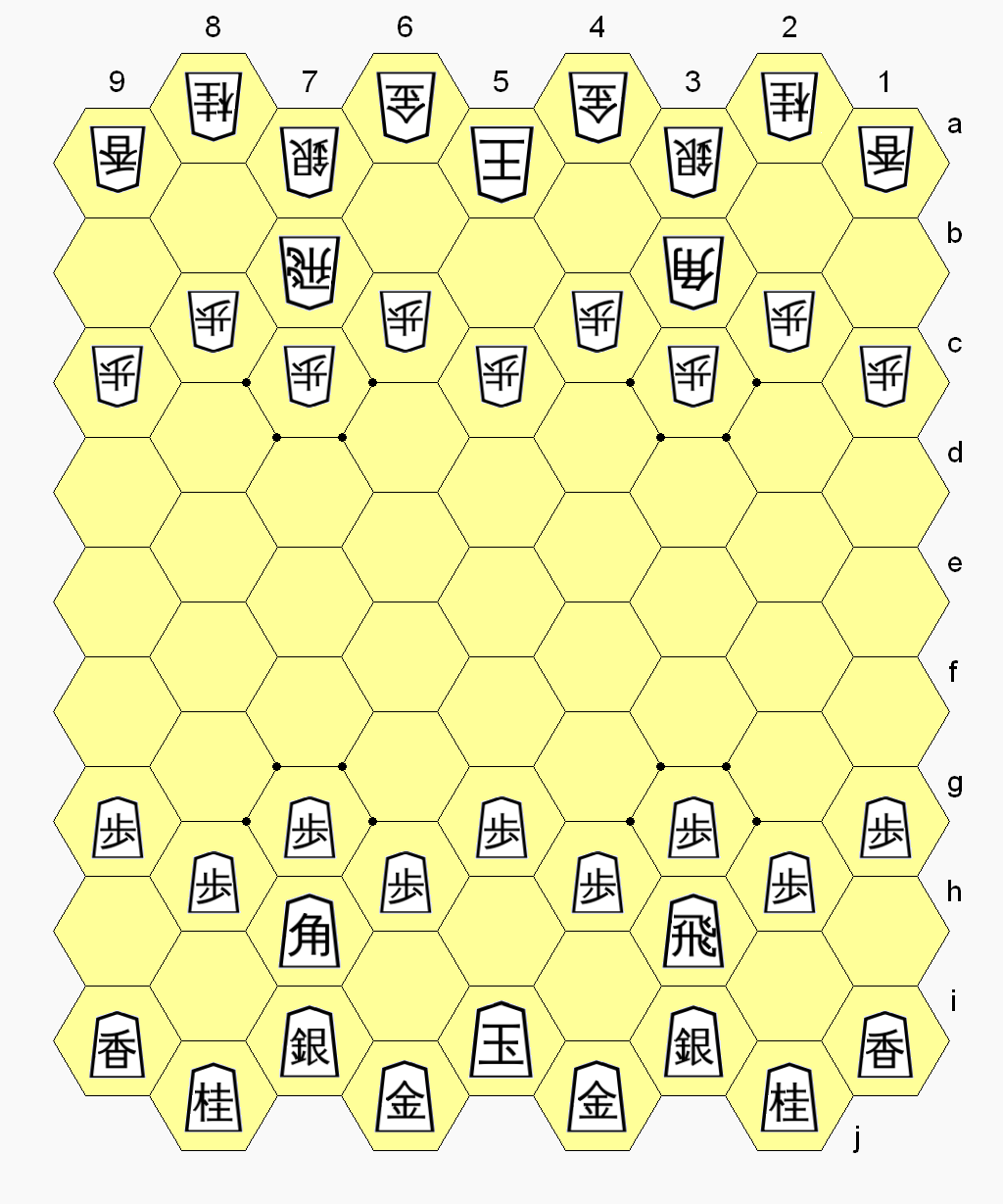
Hexshogi

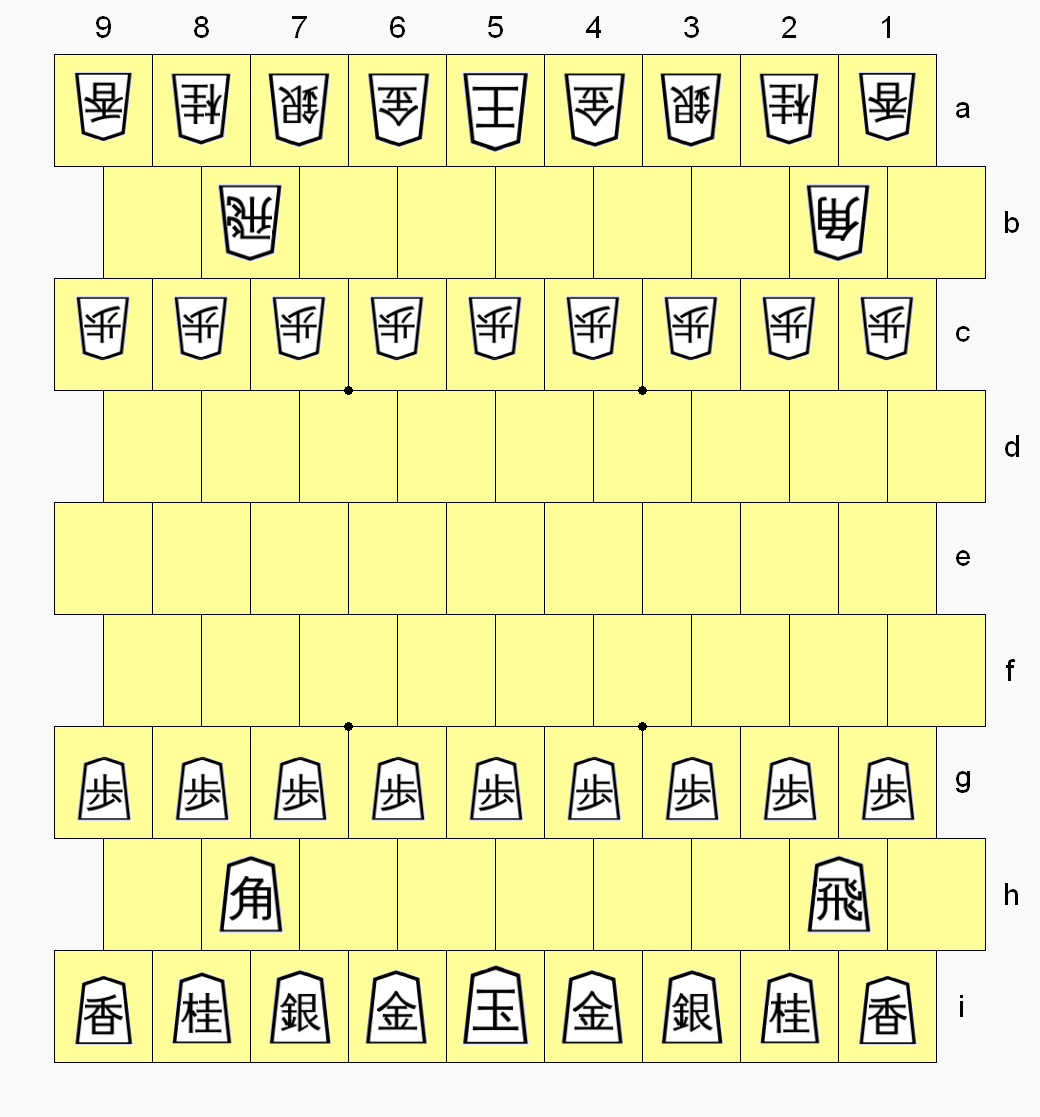
Masonic Shogi

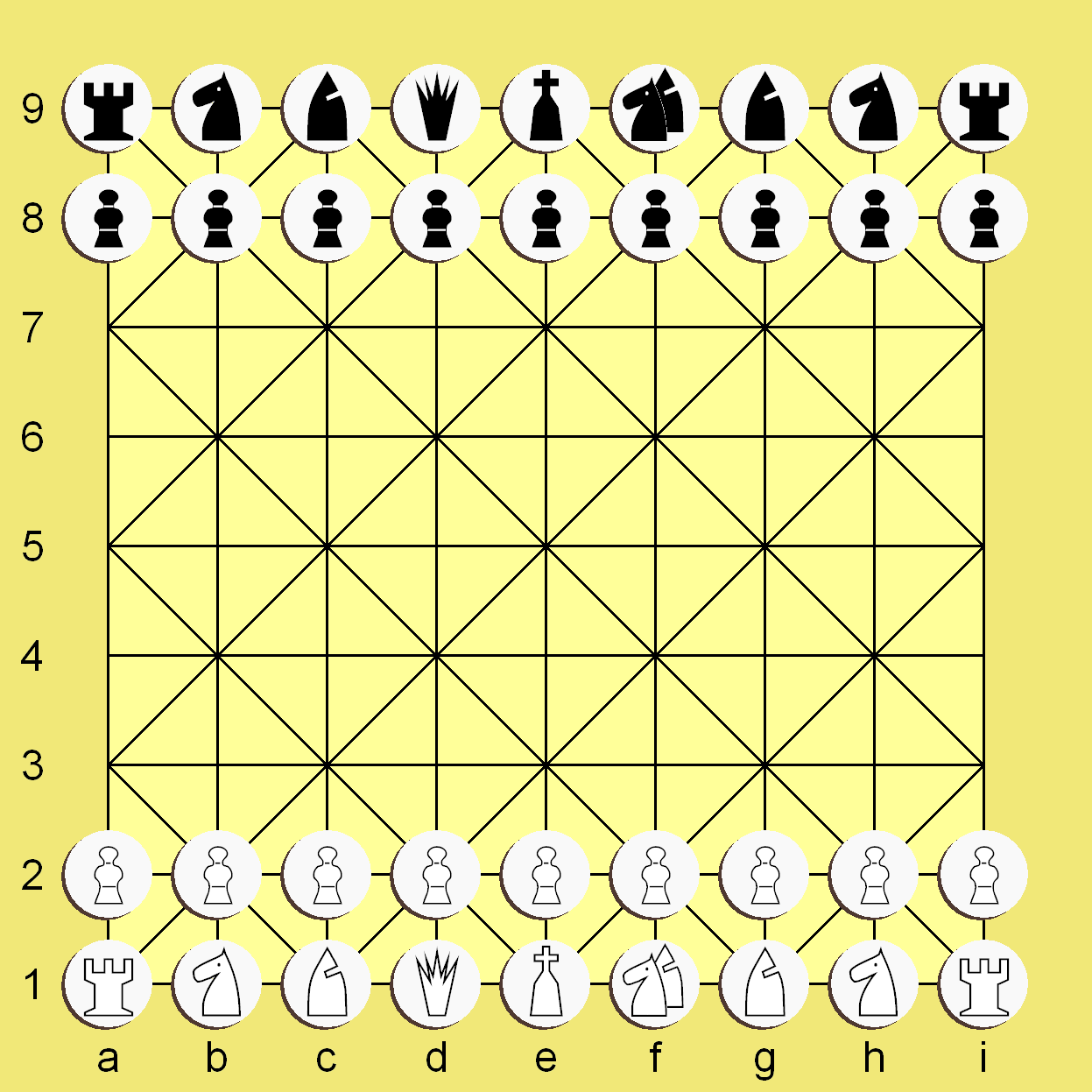
Chesquerque

== Published works ==
- Successful Trial Strategies for Prosecutors (contributor; 2005) National District Attorneys Association.
- Prosecution Principles: A Clinical Handbook (2007) West Academic Publishing. ASIN B00RWRYA9Q
- Cross-Examination Handbook: Persuasion, Strategies, and Techniques (coauthor with Ronald H. Clark and William S. Bailey; 2010 pap/com edition) Aspen Publishers. ISBN 978-073559843-0
- The Last Murder: The Investigation, Prosecution, and Execution of Ted Bundy (2011) Praeger Publishers. ISBN 978-031339743-1
- The Case against Christ: A Critique of the Prosecution of Jesus (2011) Cambridge Scholars Publishing. ISBN 978-144383194-9
  Dekle explained the background about writing this book:
  When I retired as a prosecutor back in 2005 and began my second career as a legal skills professor at the University of Florida, Levin College of Law, I began casting about looking for historical trials to use as illustrations of various points concerning the principles of good prosecution. One salient point that every prosecutor should know is that sometimes justice is better served by declining to prosecute an accused who is obviously guilty. The trial of Jesus appeared to be a prime example of this point. A fair reading of the Gospels seemed to indicate that Jesus was clearly guilty of violating the lex iulia maiestas, a minor form of treason, but just as clearly unworthy of punishment.
  and:
  I read every account of criminal trials of the first century that I could find. Jesus was basically charged with treason and there were about 40 of these types of trials documented, so I studied the details of these and read descriptions of 127 other similar ancient trials. I went all the way back to the trial of Socrates, around 300 B.C. and started there because his trial was very similar to the trial of Jesus.
- The Killing of Jorm Pelorvis (2013 Kindle Edition) ASIN B00EVHH150
- The Evolution of Chess (2013 Kindle Edition) ASIN B00EXCQDT8
- Cross-Examination Handbook: Persuasion, Strategies, and Techniques (coauthor with Ronald H. Clark and William S. Bailey; 2014 2nd Edition) Wolters Kluwer Law & Business. ISBN 978-145485200-1
- Abraham Lincoln's Most Famous Case: The Almanac Trial (2014) Praeger Publishers. ISBN 978-144083049-5
- Ted Bundy, Celebrity Slayer (2014 Kindle Edition) ASIN B00LZD5QR8
- The Lindbergh Kidnapping Case: A Critical Analysis of the Trial of Bruno Richard Hauptmann (coauthor with James M. Dedman III; 2016) The Lawbook Exchange, Ltd. ISBN 978-161619533-5
- Chronicles of Crime and Criminals: Thirty Two Years in the Courtroom (2017) Independently published. ISBN 978-1520686332
- Prairie Defender: The Murder Trials of Abraham Lincoln (2017) Southern Illinois University Press ISBN 978-080933597-8
- The Annotated Chancellor Chess (author Ben R. Foster, with annotations and an appendix by Dekle; 2017) Independently published. ISBN 978-1520905921
- Six Capsules: The Gilded Age Murder of Helen Potts (2019) Kent State University Press. ISBN 978-1606353707
- The Lindbergh Kidnapping Case: What the Lawyers Said (editor; 2020) Independently published. ISBN 978-1549535833
- The East River Ripper: The Mysterious 1891 Murder of Old Shakespeare (2021) Kent State University Press. ISBN 978-1606354261
- A Retired Prosecutor's Random Thoughts (2021) Independently published. ISBN 979-8789996980
- Variations on the Theme of Chess (2023) Independently published. ISBN 979-8394289873
- Canada's Greatest Murder Case: The 1891 Prosecution of the Hyams Twins (2024) Independently published. ISBN 979-8877578210
- Gospel Parallels: A Synopsis of the First Three Gospels Including Parallels from John's Gospel (2024) Independently published. ISBN 979-8336374902
- 100 More Variations on the Theme of Chess (2024) Independently published. ISBN 979-8302202642
- Modern Chess Eccentricities and Where to Play Them (2025) Independently published. ISBN 979-8309249633
- Prosecution Principles: A Clinical Handbook (2025 2nd Edition) West Academic Publishing. ASIN B0FL3HD62X. ISBN 979-8317700669

== See also ==
- List of Levin College of Law graduates
- List of University of Florida faculty and administrators
