= Masonic chess =

Chess variant

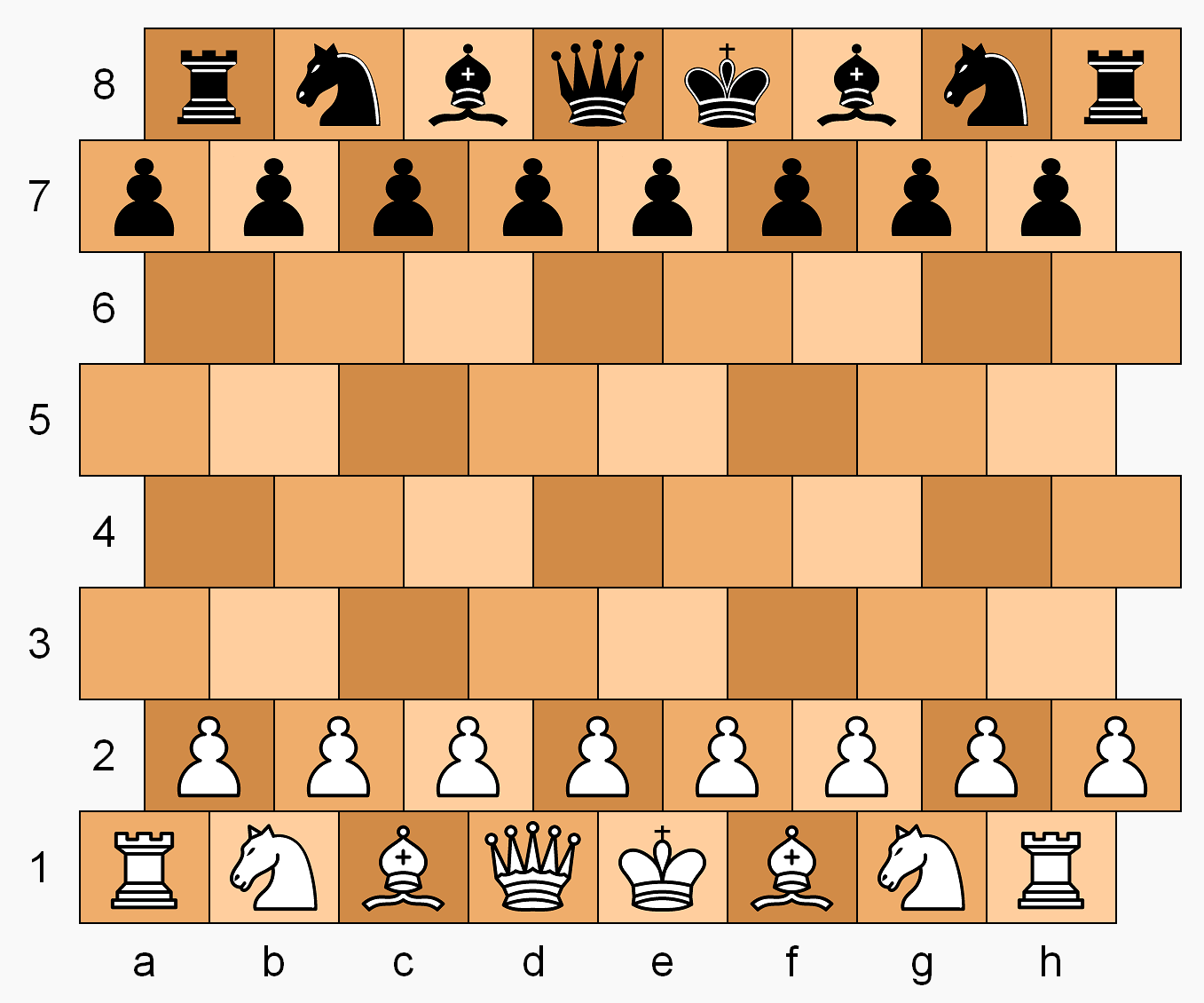
Masonic chess gameboard and starting position

Masonic chess is a chess variant invented by George R. Dekle Sr. in 1983. The game is played on a modified chessboard whereby even-numbered ranks are indented to the right—resembling masonry brickwork. The moves of the pieces are adapted to the new geometry; in other respects the game is the same as chess.

Masonic chess was included in World Game Review No. 10 edited by Michael Keller.

== Board characteristics ==
The Masonic board cells are slightly rectangular, and indentation of alternating ranks results in cants (oblique files) 30° from the vertical and diagonals 30° from the horizontal, the same as hexagon-based chessboards when cell vertices face the players. (For example, rooks have six directions of movement, and Masonic pawns move and capture the same as pawns in De Vasa's hexagonal chess. Masonic bishops, however, are limited to the four diagonal directions to the sides.) As with hex-based boards, three colors are used, so no two adjacent cells are the same color, and gameboard diagonals are highlighted.

== Game rules ==
The diagram shows the starting setup. All normal chess rules apply, including conventions for castling either kingside or queenside, a pawn's initial two-step option, en passant captures, promotion, and so on, but the pieces have specially defined moves.

=== Piece moves ===
- A rook moves along the rank (two directions) and cants (four directions).
- A bishop moves on diagonals to the sides (four directions), or one step as a rook (six directions).
- The queen moves as a rook and bishop. (Ten directions.)
- The king moves one step as a queen.
- A knight moves in the pattern: one step as a rook, then one step diagonally in the same (forward, backward, or sideways) direction. A knight leaps any intervening men.
- A pawn moves one step forward as a rook; on its first move it may optionally move two steps forward in the same direction. A pawn captures one step diagonally forward; en passant captures are permitted.

=== Piece moves illustrated ===
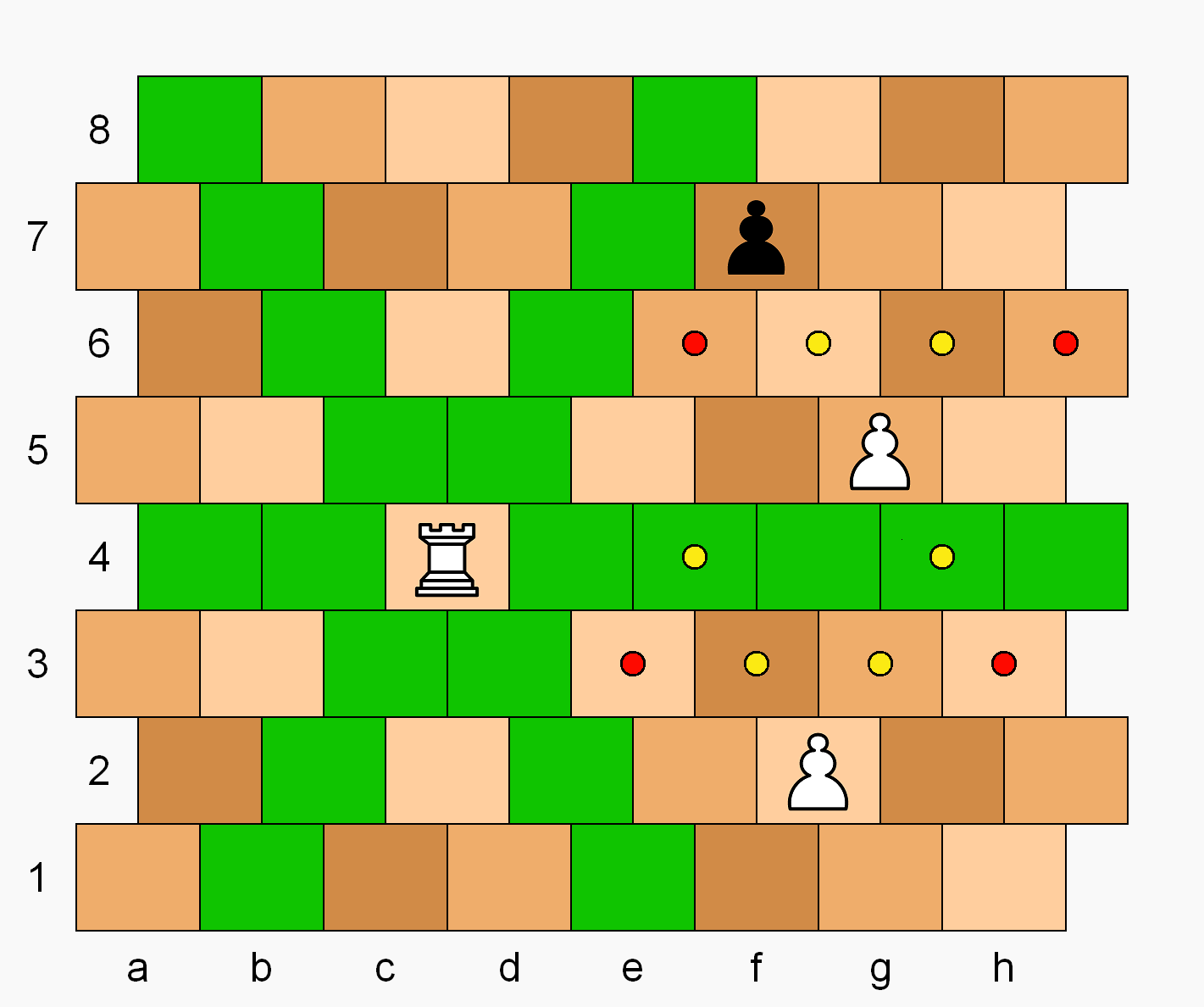
The rook can move to any green-colored cell in the diagram. The white pawn on f2, since it has not yet moved, has four move options (yellow dots) and two ways to capture (red dots). The white pawn on g5 has moved from its initial cell, so has two forward move options and two ways to capture. If Black moves his f7-pawn to either e6 or e5, White can capture it, for example: 1... e5 2. g5xe6 e.p.

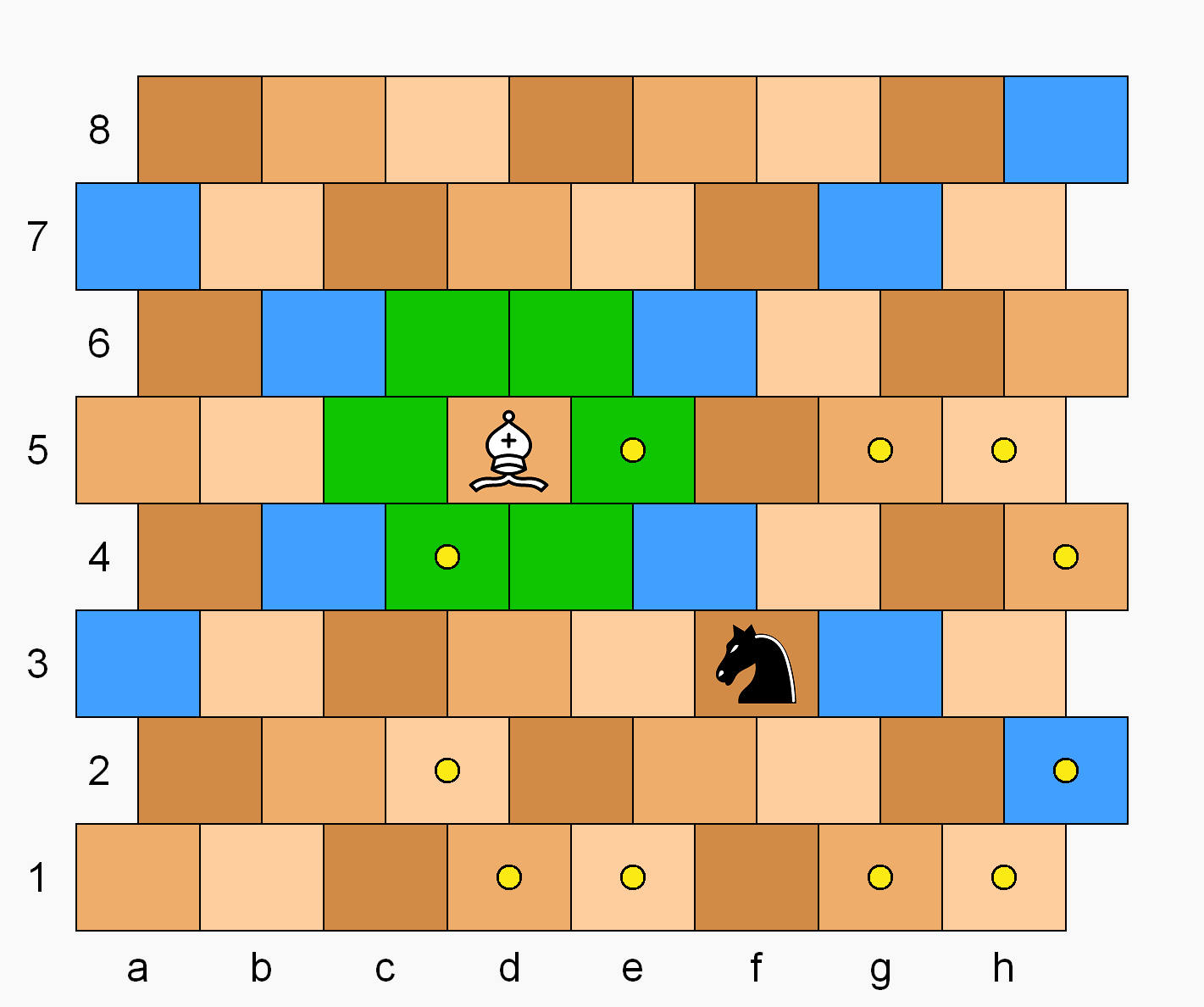
The bishop can move on diagonals to any blue-colored cell in the diagram, or one step as a rook to any green-colored cell. The knight can move to any yellow dot, or it can capture the bishop.

== See also ==
- De Vasa's hexagonal chess
- Also by George Dekle:
  - Masonic Shogi
  - Cross chess – a hexagonal variant with cross-shaped cells
