= Hexshogi =

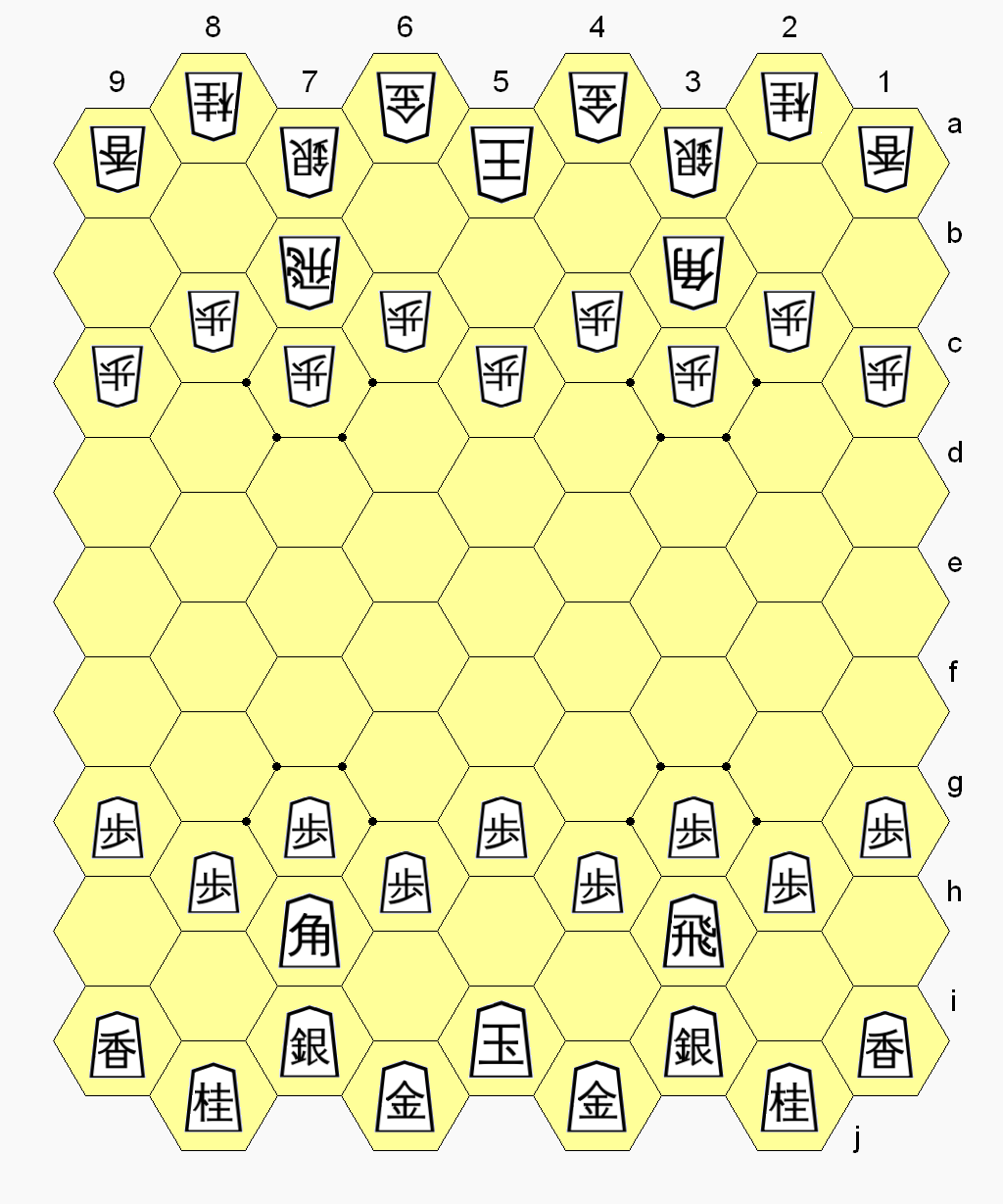
Hexshogi gameboard and starting position

Hexshogi is a shogi variant for two players created by George R. Dekle Sr. in 1986. The gameboard comprises 85 hexagonal cells. The game is in all respects the same as shogi, except that piece moves have been transfigured for the hexagonal board-cell geometry.

Hexshogi was included in World Game Review No. 10 edited by Michael Keller.

== Game rules ==
Hexshogi has the same types and numbers of pieces as shogi, and all normal shogi rules apply, including a similar initial setup (see diagram), drops, promotion, check, checkmate, and impasse. As in shogi, pieces capture the same as they move. But the hexagonal geometry implies special move patterns for the pieces.

=== Piece moves ===
The diagrams show how the unpromoted pieces move. As in shogi, a dragon king (promoted rook) moves as a rook, or as a king. A dragon horse (promoted bishop) moves as a bishop or a king.

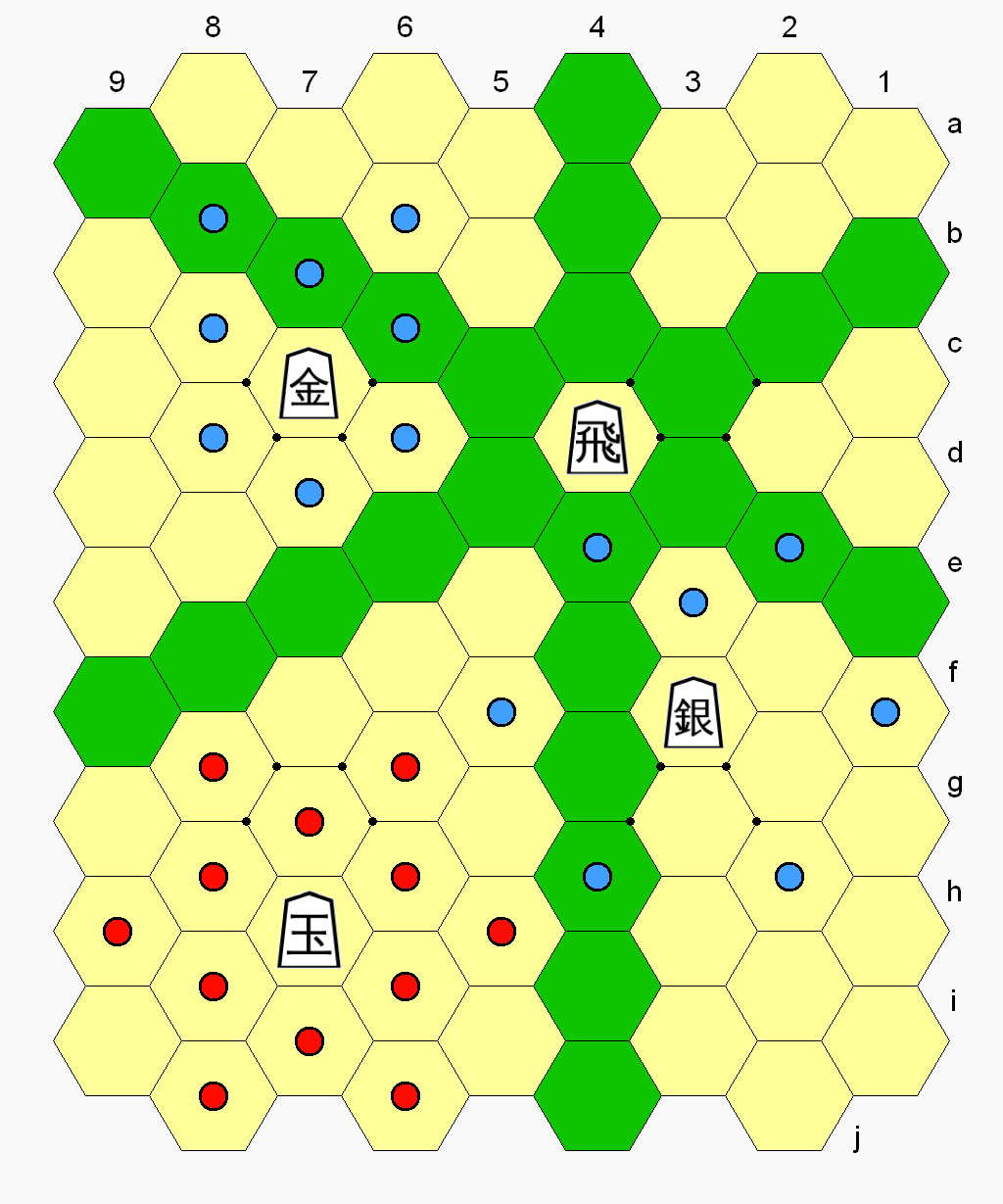
The rook (4d) moves in six directions along vertical or oblique files (in the diagram, to any green-colored cell). (Note: The Hexshogi rook, bishop, and king have the same moves as their counterpart pieces in Gliński's hexagonal chess. (Also the Hexshogi knight, except that the knight is restricted, as in shogi, to the two most straight-forward moves.) (Pritchard 2007:260)) The king (7h) moves one step in any direction (red dots). The gold general (7c, blue dots) moves one step like a rook, or one step diagonally forward. The silver general (3f, blue dots) moves one step in any direction diagonally, or one step straight forward.

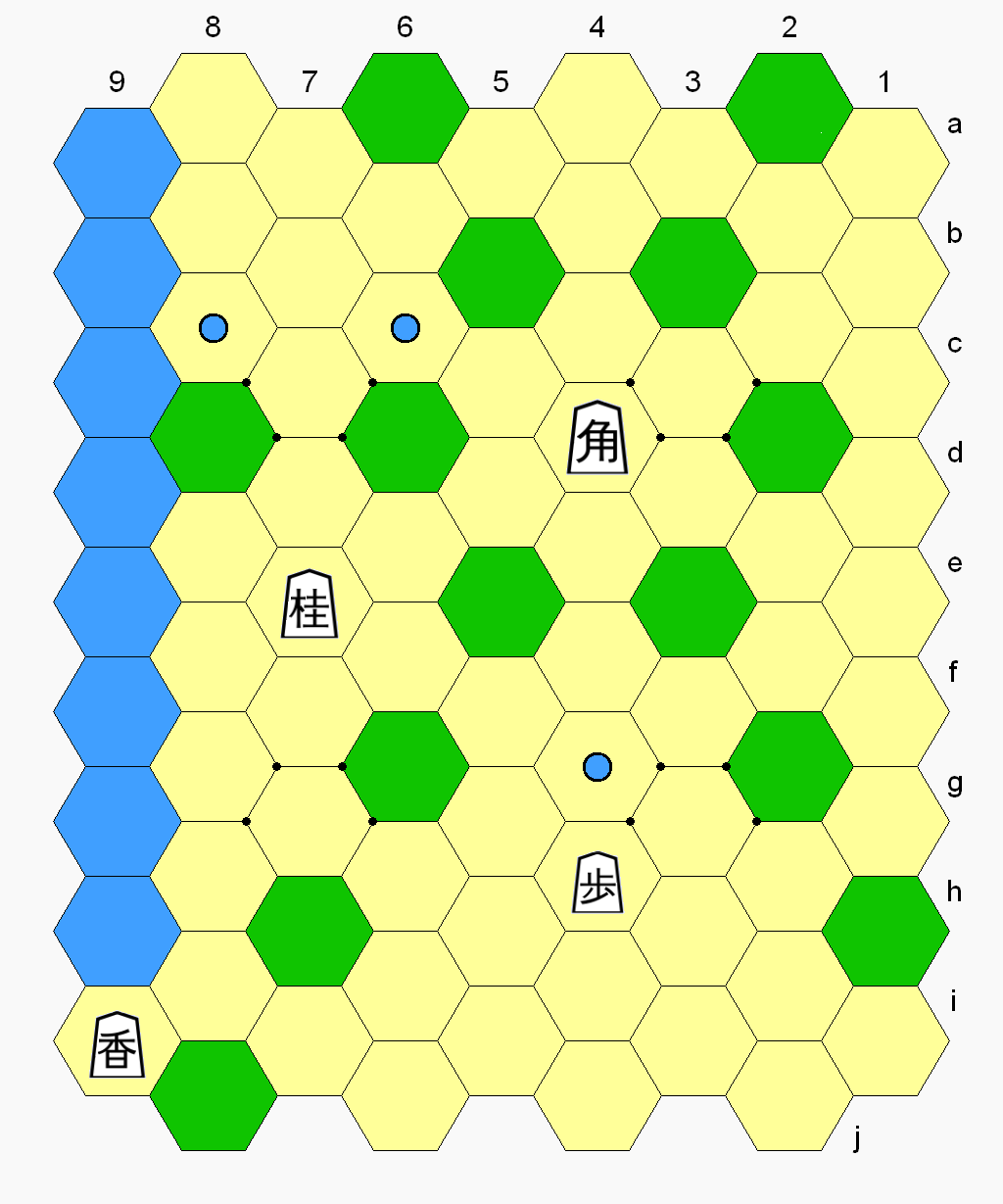
The bishop (4d) moves in six directions along board diagonals (green-colored cells). It is restricted to one third of the board before promotion. The lance (9i) moves straight forward only (blue-colored cells). As in shogi, knights leap any intervening men and have two possible forward moves (7e, blue dots). A pawn (4h) always moves one cell straight forward (blue dot).

== See also ==
- Gliński's hexagonal chess
- Also by George Dekle:
  - Trishogi – a variant with triangular cells
  - Masonic Shogi
  - Space Shogi – a 3D variant
