= Trishogi =

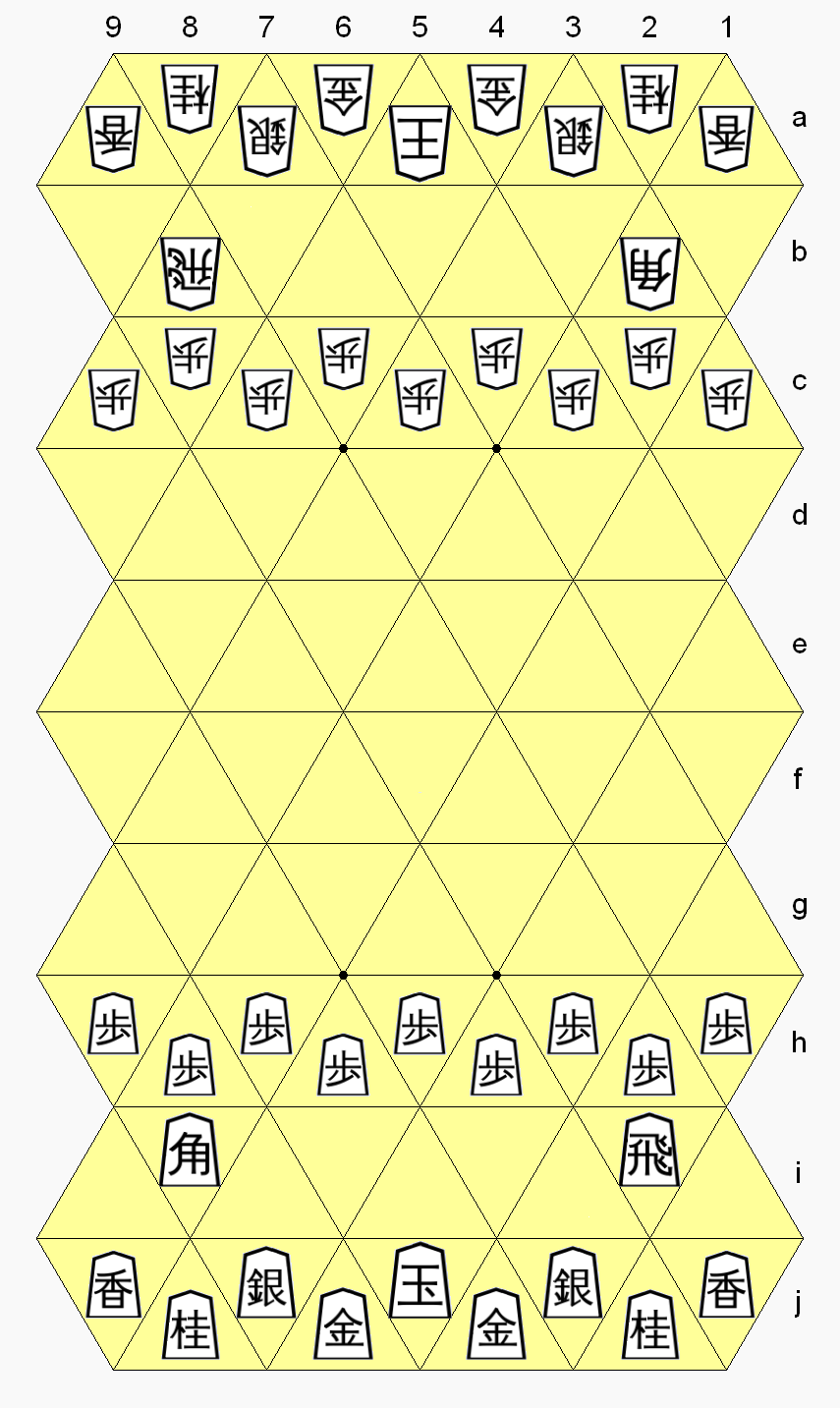
Trishogi gameboard and starting position

Trishogi is a shogi variant for two players created by George R. Dekle Sr. in 1987. The gameboard comprises 9×10 interlocking triangular cells. The game is in all respects the same as shogi, except that piece moves have been transfigured for the triangular board-cell geometry.

Trishogi was included in World Game Review No. 10 edited by Michael Keller.

== Game rules ==
Trishogi has the same types and numbers of pieces as shogi, and all normal shogi rules apply, including initial setup (see diagram), drops, promotion, check, and checkmate. As in shogi, pieces capture the same as they move. But the triangular geometry creates special move patterns for the pieces.

=== Piece moves ===
The diagrams show how the unpromoted pieces move. As in shogi, a dragon king (promoted rook) moves as a rook and as a king. A dragon horse (promoted bishop) moves as a bishop and king.

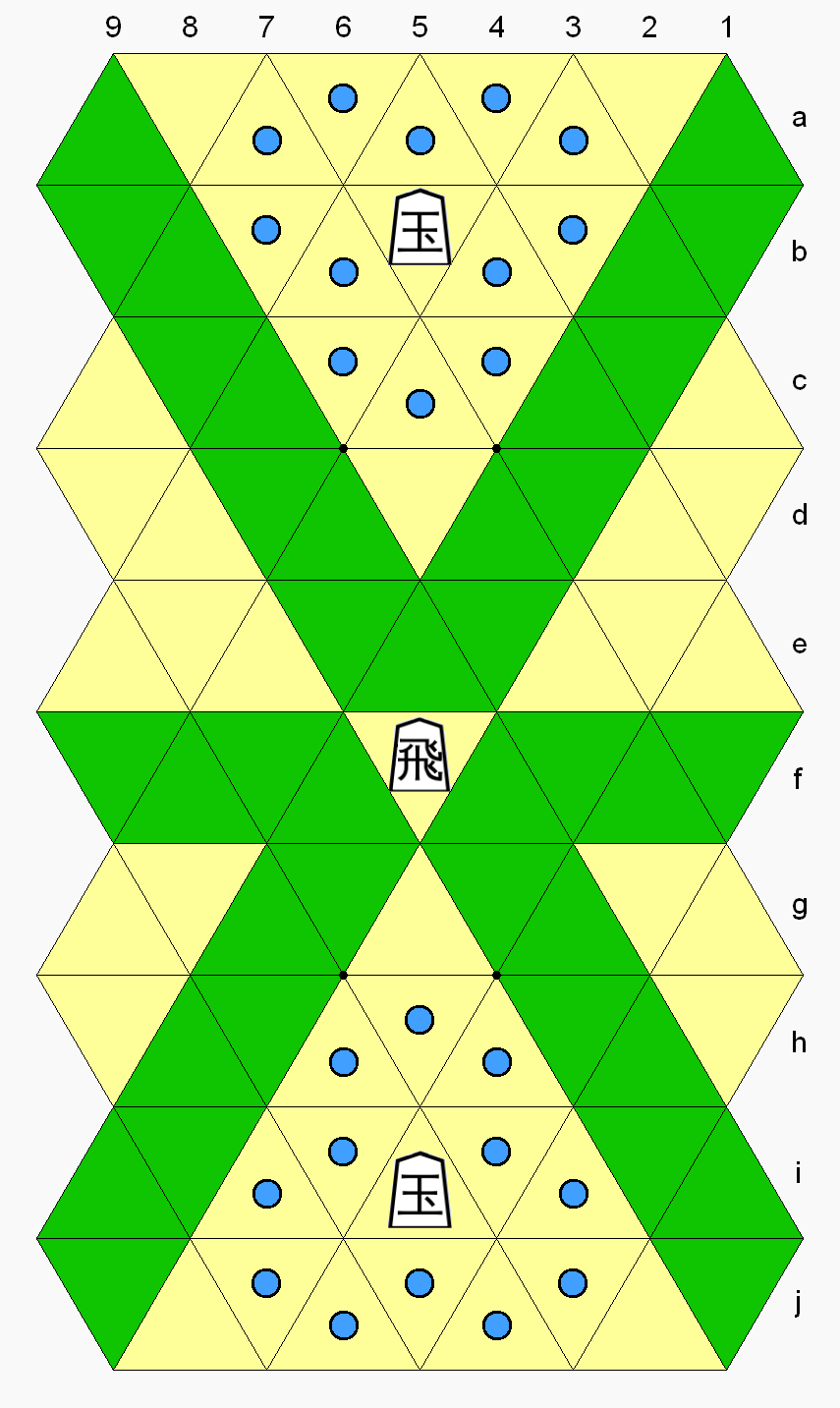
The rook (5f) moves in six directions along horizontal ranks or oblique files (in the diagram, to any green-colored cell). The king moves to any of the 12 surrounding cells (blue dots), whether the triangle apex points towards or away from the player. The king may not leap an intervening man.

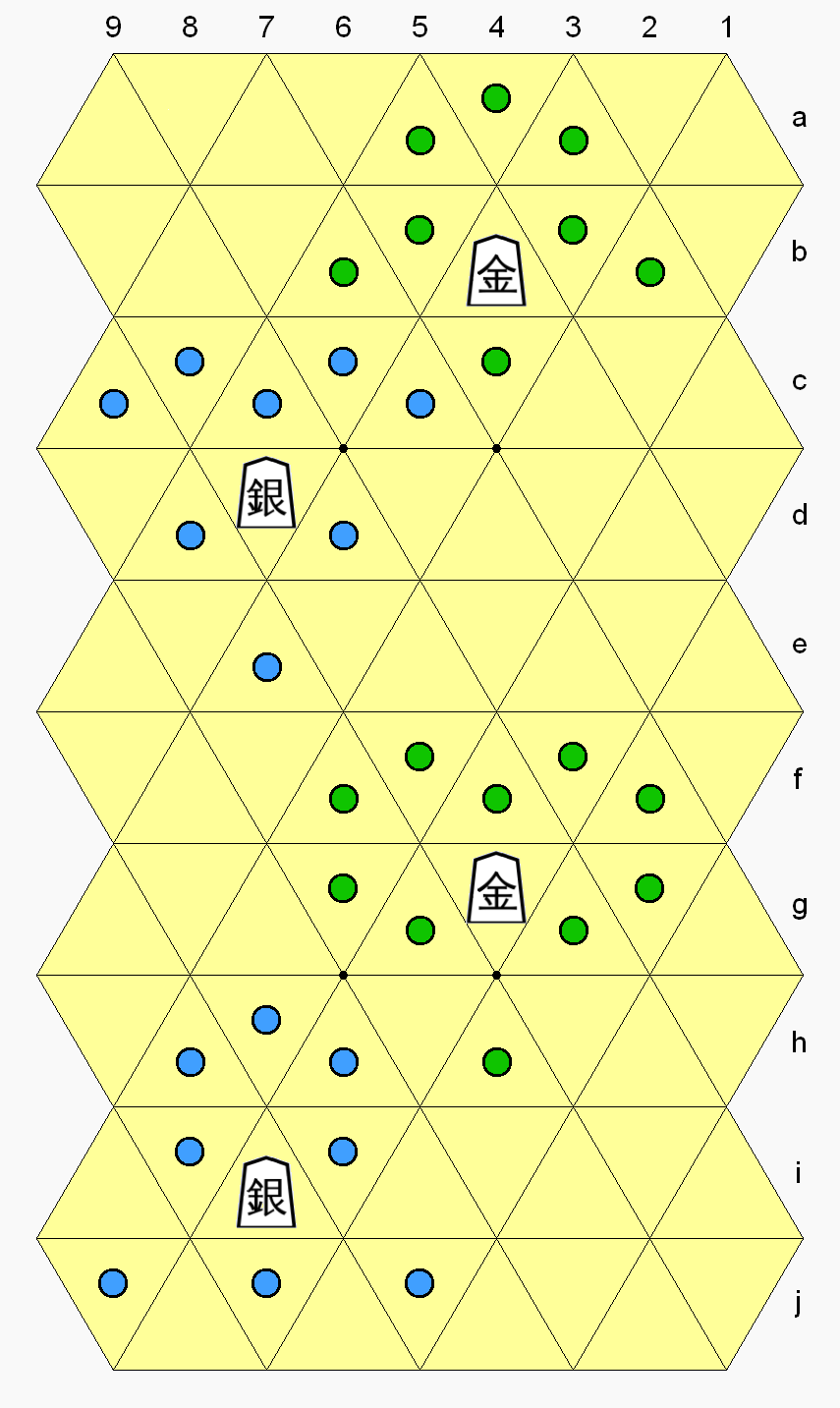
The silver general has eight ways to move (blue dots); the pattern differs depending on whether the triangle apex points towards or away from the player. The gold general has either eight or ten ways to move (green dots); again depending on the orientation of the cell apex. Neither silver nor gold may leap an intervening man.

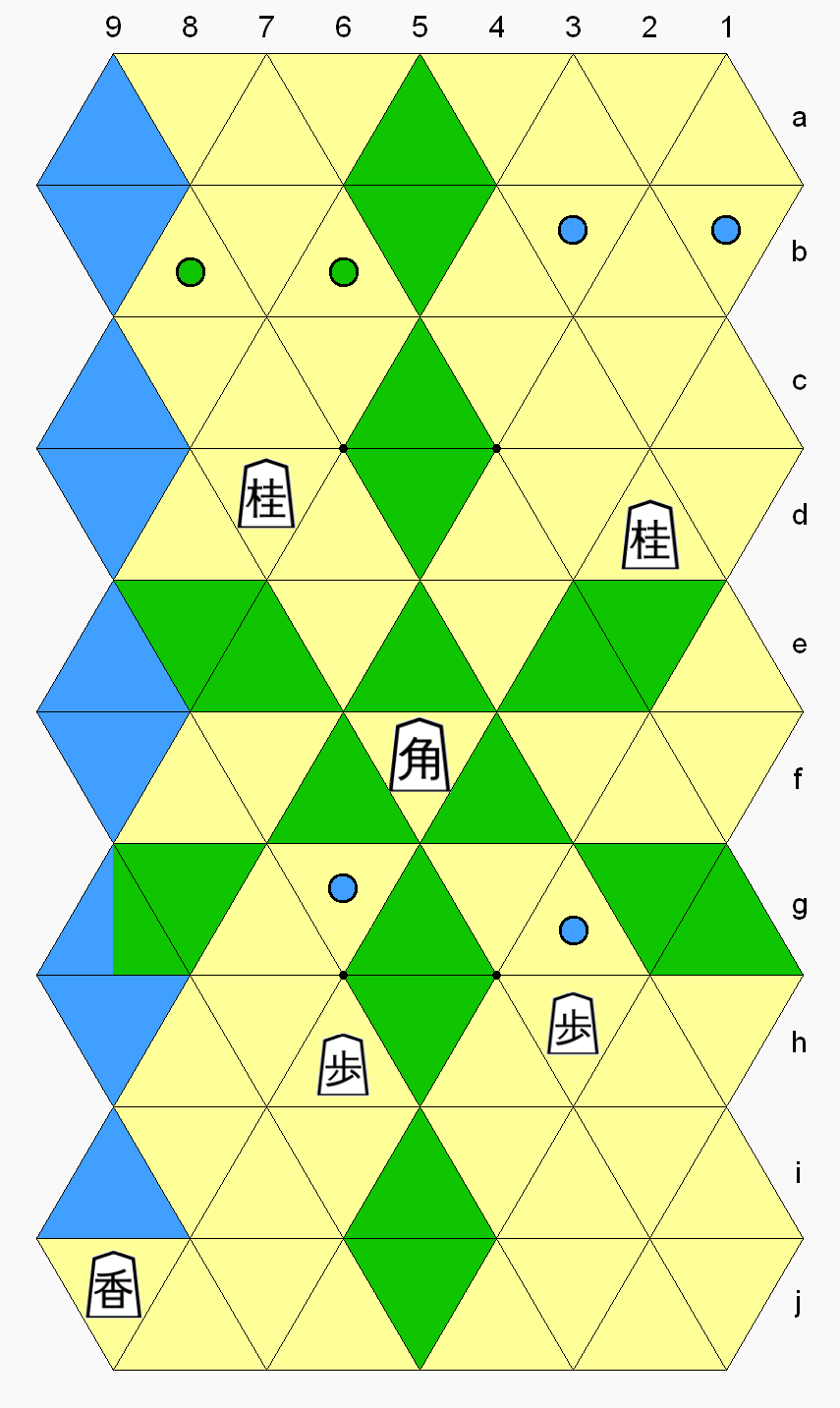
The bishop (5f) moves in six directions constituting board diagonals (green-colored cells). The lance (9j) also moves on a diagonal, but straight forward only (blue-colored cells). As in shogi, knights leap any intervening men and have two possible forward moves: the knight on a cell with apex towards the player (7d) can move to green dots; the knight on cell with apex away (2d) can move to blue dots. A pawn always moves one cell straight forward (6h and 3h, to respective blue dots).

== See also ==
- Shogi variants
- Also by George Dekle:
  - Hexshogi – a variant with hexagonal cells
  - Masonic shogi
  - Space shogi – a 3D variant
  - Triangular Chess – a chess variant with triangular cells
