= Chongqing delegation to the National People's Congress =

Chongqing Delegation to the National People's Congress
- 全国人民代表大会重庆市代表团
- Delegation for the National People's Congress
- Map showing the location of Shanghai Municipality
- Electoral unit: Chongqing Municipality
- Population: 32,054,159

Current Delegation
- Created: 1954
- Seats: 58
- Head of delegation: Wang Jiong
- Municipal People's Congress: Chongqing Municipal People's Congress

The Chongqing delegation to the National People's Congress is a delegation composed of deputies representing Chongqing Municipality in within the National People's Congress (NPC), the highest organ of state power of the People's Republic of China. NPC deputies from Chongqing Municipality are officially elected by the Chongqing Municipal People's Congress.

== List of deputies ==
Year	NPC sessions	Deputies	Number of deputies	Ref.
1954	1st	Wang Huaichen, Ren Baige, He Yuanhai, Li Bingzhong, Shen Gunan, Hu Ziang, Ma Yanshan, Cao Diqiu, Chen Shulan, Huang Rongchang, Yang Rukun, Liu Lanqi, Cai Shufan, Xiao Songli, Lai Jifa, Xian Ying	16	
1959	2nd	Part of the Sichuan delegation		
1964	3rd	Part of the Sichuan delegation		
1975	4th	Part of the Sichuan delegation		
1978	5th	Part of the Sichuan delegation		
1983	6th	Part of the Sichuan delegation		
1988	7th	Part of the Sichuan delegation		
1993	8th	Part of the Sichuan delegation		
1998	9th	Yu Hanqing, Wang Yunlong, Wang Shifu, Wang Liming, Gan Yuping, Bai Lixi, Xing Yuanmin, Xiang Zhonghuai, Liu Zhonghui (Tujia), Liu Jiyuan, Liu Zhizhong, Liu Chonglai, Jiang Congshou, Xu You, Xu Zhiqin, Xu Jialu, Sun Yongfu, Li Chengkun (Tujia), Li Mengjiu, Li Deshui, Yang Maochao, Shu Yide, Xiao Yunhui, Wu Xufeng, Yu Min, Wang Linlin, Zhang Yuanzhu, Zhang Chuanbin, Zhang Guoan, Zhang Zonghai, Zhang Delin, Chen Wanzhi, Chen Wanli, Chen Shanghua, Chen Jiyuan, Chen Guofen, Chen Hong, Luo Zhongli, Luo Haijun, Jin Lie, Zhao Gongqing, Zhao Xueqing, Yao Jianquan, Yao Zhenwei, He Guoqiang, Yuan Changyu, Qian Shuyuan (Miao), Guo Daiyi, Yan Huazheng, Huang Xiyue (Hui), Huang Jiafu (Miao), Peng Fusheng, Dong Deming, Zeng Yuanlu, Xie Ping, Pu Haiqing, Liao Changguang, Xiong Xiujie		
2003	10th	Yu Xuexin, Ma Qianzhen (female), Ma Zhengqi, Wang Yunlong, Wang Hongju, Yin Jiaxu, Kong Weiliang, Bai Lixi, Lü Jiancheng, Liu Zhonghui (female, Tujia), Liu Wen, Liu Ning (female), Liu Chengyi, Liu Jiyuan, Liu Minghua, Xu Zhiqin (female), Xu Jialu, Li Zuwei, Li Xiaofeng, Yang Tianyi, Yang Xiaobi (female, Miao), Wu Gang, Wu Jianglin, He Shengping, He Depei, Yu Jie, Yu Min (female), Zhang Li, Zhang Lihui (female), Zhang Mingliang, Zhang Zong Qing, Zhang Shaozhi, Chen Jiyuan, Chen Yizhuo (female), Chen Guangguo, Chen Zhonglin, Chen Guiyun, Ou Keping, Luo Zhongli, Jin Lie, Zhou Xu, Zhong Shirong, Jiang Yikang, He Guoqiang, Yuan Changyu (female), Xia Zhining, Guo Xiangdong, Guo Shuyan, Tang Hongjun, Tu Anxiang (Miao), Huang Shiyan, Huang Qifan, Huang Xiyue (Hui), Huang Zhendong, Dong Deming, Jiang Shaohua, Han Deyun, Cheng Yiju, Lu Shankun, Xie Li (female), Tan Xiwei (Tujia), Pan Fusheng		
2008	11th	Ma Zhigeng, Ma Zhengqi, Wang Yunlong, Wang Yunnong, Wang Xiaolin (female), Wang Hongju, Wang Yue, Yin Jiaxu, Ai Zhiquan, Ye Linwei (female), Bai Lisha (female), Hua Yusheng, Liu Weixing, Liu Guanglei, Liu Baoya (Tujia), An Qihong, Sun Shenlin (Tujia), Sun Xiaomei (female), Li Xiaoyan (female, Miao), Li Xiaofeng, Yang Tianyi, Yang Qingyu, Wu Yajun (female), Wu Zaiju (Miao), Wu Jianglin, Wu Zhenglong, Wang Xia (female), Shen Changfu, Shen Tiemei ((Female), Zhang Guoan, Zhang Ling (female), Chen Wanzhi, Chen Guangguo, Chen Zhonglin, Chen Guiyun, Wu Xiufeng, Luo Zhongli, Zhou Ping (female), Zhou Guangquan, Zhou Qi (female), Zheng Xiangdong, Hu Jiankang, Duan Laka, Jiang Xingchang, Yuan Changyu (female), Xia Zhining, Guo Xiangdong, Tang Hongjun, Tu Jianhua, Huang Qifan, Sheng Yanong (female), Cui Jian, Kang Houming, Jiang Yong, Han Deyun, Hei Xinwen (female), Cheng Yiju, Lu Shankun, Xie Xiaojun, Pu Haiqing, Tan Xiwei (Tujia ethnic group), Bo Xilai		
2013	12th	Ma Zhengqi, Ma Zhongyuan, Wang Yuankai (Miao), Wang Haiyan (female), Wang Hongju, Ranran (female, Tujia), Feng Yue, Liu Zhanfang, Liu Xiya (female), Liu Jianzhong, Liu Zhongjun, Liu Qun, Yan Xiaopei (female), Tang Zongwei, ~~Sun Zhengcai~~, Sun Xiaomei (female), Du Liming, Li Jianchun, Li Qiu (female), Li Zuwei, Li Jin (female), Yang Fan (female), Yang Hongwei, Wu Yajun (female), Wu Zhenglong, He Ping, He Qian, Yu Min (female), Shen Jinqiang, Shen Tiemei (Female), Zhang Xuan (female), Zhang Hongchuan (female, Miao), Zhang Yu (female, Miao), Chen Guangguo, Lin Jianhua, Luo Ming, Zhou Guangquan, Zhou Qi (female), Zheng Shanglun, Meng Qingqiang, Hu Jiquan, Yuan Zhilun, Qian Feng, Guo Xiangdong, Tang Lin, Tang Hongjun, Tu Jianhua, Huang Yun, Huang Qifan, Cui Jian, Dong Shumin, Han Jianmin (female), Han Deyun, Cheng Donghong (female), Cheng Dehong, Shi Shenzhen, Xie Xiaojun, Xie Deti, Liao Qingxuan, Liao Xiaojun, ~~Tan Xiwei~~ (Tujia ethnic group)		
2018	13th	Ma Shanxiang (Hui), Wang Fu, Wang Yi, Wang Weidong, Wang Xiaowan, Shi Shulan (female, Miao), Ran Hui (female, Tujia), Shi Haofei, Zhu Huarong, Zhu Mingyue (Tujia), Hua Xiaoli (female), Xiang Xiaobo, Liu Yuting, Liu Xiya (female), Liu Zhongjun, Liu Guiping, Liu Jiaqi, Jiang Xiaojuan (female), Xu Ren'an, Sun Xianzong, Du Liming, Li Qiu (female), Li Yanping (female), Li Shaoyu (female, Miao), Li Chunkui, Li Dianxun, Yang Fan (female), Yang Linping (female) Wu Cunrong, Wu Yan (female), Bie Biliang, He Yiting, Shen Jinqiang, Shen Tiemei (female), Zhang Xuan (female), Zhang Jie, Zhang Jian, Zhang Xinghai, Zhang Shaoyong, Chen Yong (Manchu), Chen Jinshan, Chen Min'er, Zhou Yong, Zhou Shaozheng, Zheng Xiangdong, Xiu Changzhi, He Hengyang, Mo Gongming, Gao Yu (female), Guo Yonghong, Tang Liangzhi, Huang Yulin, Cao Qingyao, Han Deyun, Shi Shenzhen, Xie Deti, Pu Binbin, Qian Fangli (female), Tan Pingchuan, Tan Jianlan (female, Tujia), Pan Fusheng		
2023	14th	Wang Zhijie, Wang Shuxin, Wang Jiong, Wang Haixia, Mao Xianglin, Shi Haofei, Ran Ran, Ran Hui, Fu Zitang, Xing Nianzeng, Rong Rong, Zhu Huarong, Liu Ping, Liu Xiya, Liu Yong, Qi Meiwen, Xu Hongbin, Yan Qi, Du Weidong, Li Yongli, Li Qiu, Li Xiehua, Li Yi, Shi Xialian, Shen Zhen, Shen Jinqiang, Song Yijia, Zhang Yao, Zhang Anjiang, Zhang Xuan, Zhang Guozhong, Zhang Ming, Zhang Jian, Chen Youkun, Chen Wei, Chen Mingbo, Shao Hongting, Lin Xuyang, Lin Qixin, Zhou Shaozheng, Zhao Yufang, Zhao Liang, Hu Henghua, Zhong Daidi, Jiang Guojie, Yuan Jiajun, Xia Yong, Qian Jianchao, Yin Qilong, Huang Dayong, Cao Qingyao, Gong Dingling, Yan Xiaoming, Jiang Chenghua, Jiang Lingfeng, Fu Shanxiang, Fu Guotao, Xie Wenhui, Lan Qinghua, Pan Fusheng, Wei Houkai		
