= Encyclopedia of Chinese Chess Openings =

The Encyclopedia of Chinese Chess Openings (Chinese: 中国象棋开局编号) is a book that lists all the possible opening moves of Chinese chess (Xiangqi), including rarely used openings.

The editor of Encyclopedia of Chess Network included the first game of the 8197 Board as the basis, to draw up the ECCO code. ECCO characteristics of the times has numbers, due to the development of the game ECCO reference to the cut-off in 2004, the number of the system to be known as ECCO 2004.
