= Northern Zhou Xiangxi =

Chinese board game

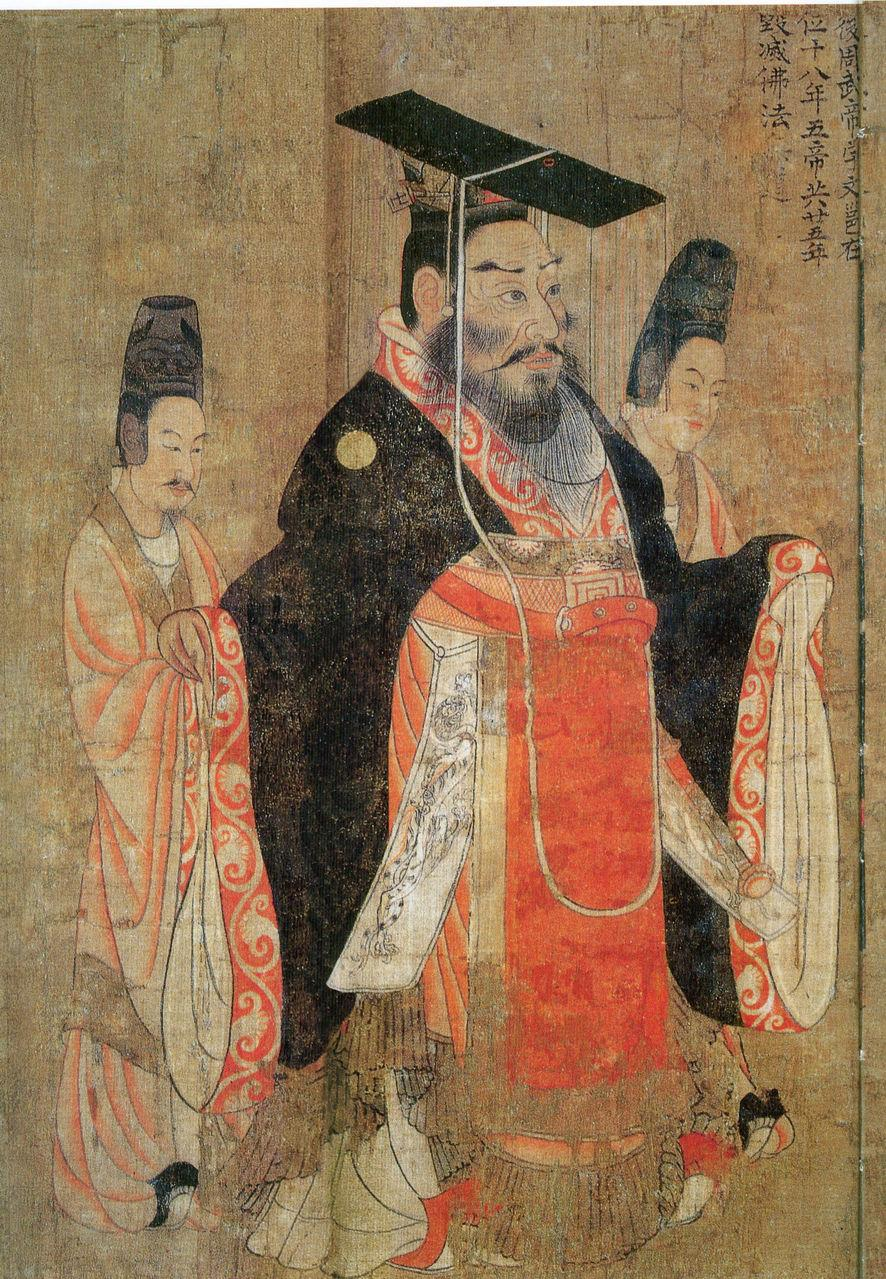
Emperor Wu.

Northern Zhou Xiangxi was a two player board game played during the Northern Zhou dynasty, at the end of the Northern and Southern dynasties period in China. Due to its name (象), it is often mistaken for a chess-like game or as the predecessor of Xiangqi, yet there were many different games in Chinese history which bore similar names before the advent of Xiangqi as it is known today during the Song dynasty. Scholars have denied that the game resembled chess. Based on the rules as recorded in the surviving chapters of Emperor Wu's Xiang Jing, it was instead a racing game.

== History ==
The game was first described in the Xiang Jing, compiled by Emperor Wu and his ministers. By the early Tang dynasty, no one could interpret the game and it was lost.

== Rules ==
The rules of Xiangxi were not described clearly, but are instead recorded in poems. It was played on a board resembling the one used in the game of Chupu (樗蒲)
