= Game of the Seven Kingdoms =

Variant of the Chinese game xiangqi

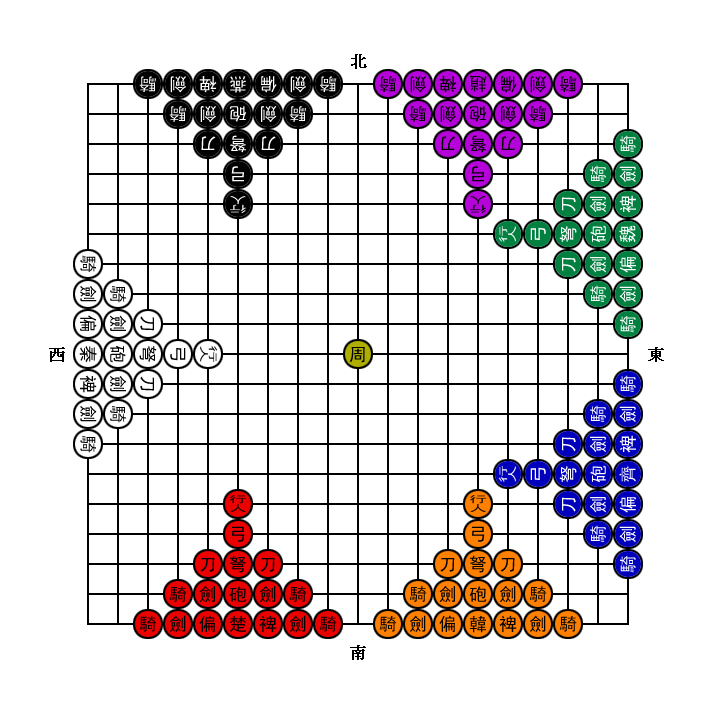
- Starting position
- Years active: Since 13th century
- Genres: Abstract strategy game Chess variant
- Players: 7
- Skills: Strategy, tactics
- Synonyms: Seven-handed xiangqi Qiquo xiangqi

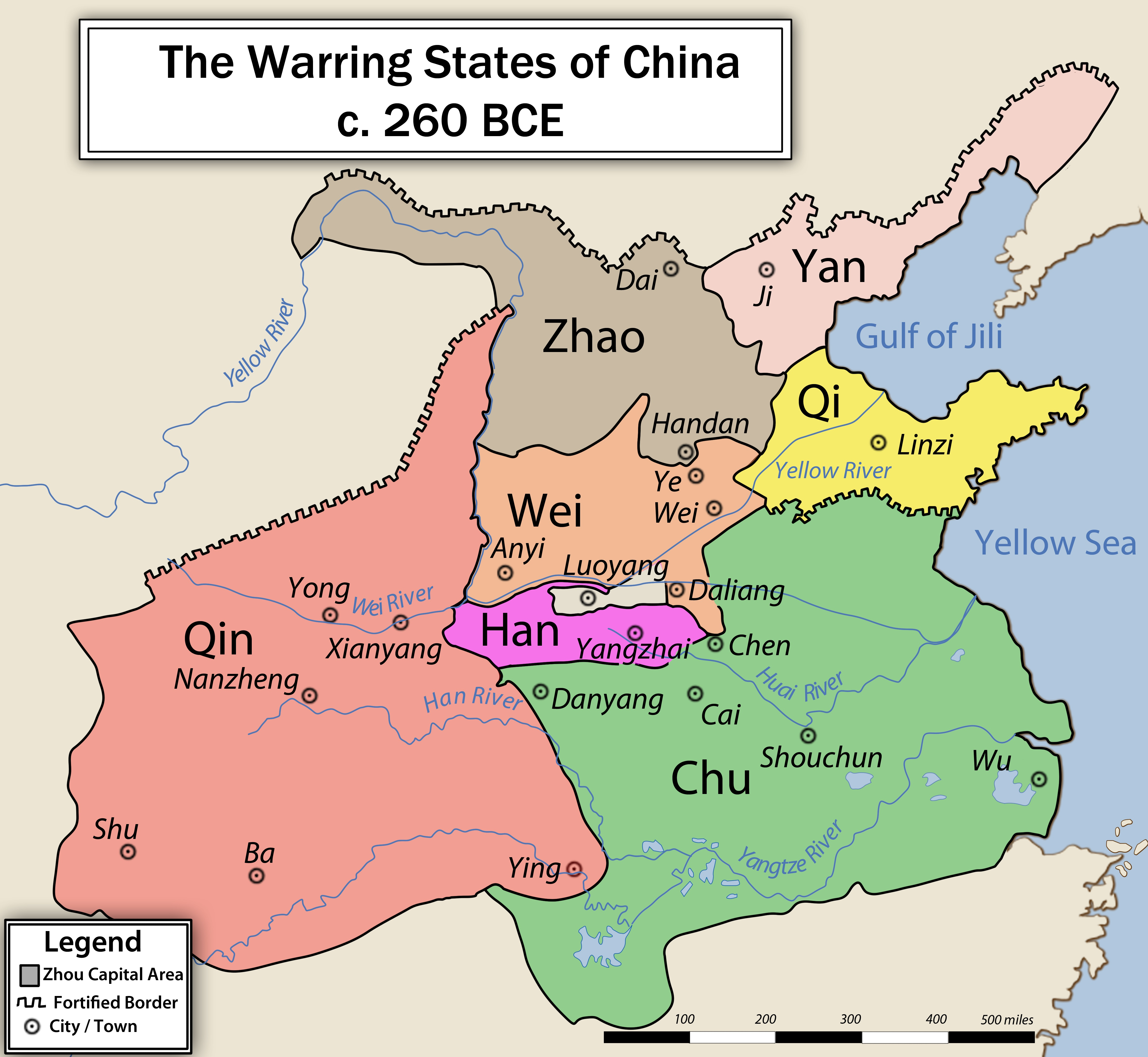
Game of the Seven Kingdoms symbolizes the Seven Warring States period (403–221 BC).

Game of the Seven Kingdoms (Chinese: 七國象棋, p qī-guó-xiàng-qí ;) is a seven-player variant of the game xiangqi ("Chinese chess"). It is traditionally ascribed to Sima Guang, although he died well before the 13th century, to which this game is traditionally dated. The rules of the game can be found in his book, 古局象棋圖. There is skepticism regarding the game's 13th-century formulation.

== Game rules ==
=== Players ===
The game is normally played by seven players. If there are fewer players, the extra kingdoms can be removed, or some players can own more than one kingdom. Players are allowed to team up, but may not discuss with their teammates during the game.

=== Equipment and setup ===
The board is the same as a Go board. Each side has 17 pieces: a general (將), a chancellor (偏), a diplomat (裨), a cannon (砲), a go-between (行人), an archer (弓), a crossbowman (弩), two dagger soldiers (刀), four swordsmen (劍), and four knights (騎). The name of the general varies according to the kingdom it represents. The seven kingdoms are:

- Qin (秦), the white army, in the west
- Chu (楚), the red army, in the south
- Han (韓), the orange army, in the south
- Qi (齊), the blue army, in the east
- Wei (魏), the green army, in the east
- Zhao (趙), the purple army, in the north
- Yan (燕), the black army, in the north

The position of the seven armies somewhat reflects the geographical position of the seven Warring States. (It is possible that the original rules mistakenly swapped Zhao and Yan.)

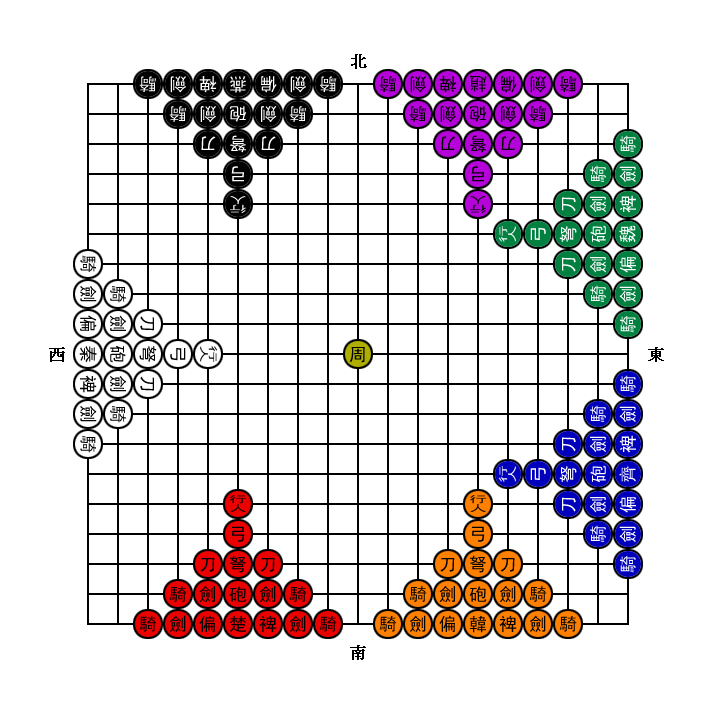
The yellow piece in the board center is "the emperor" (周), which does not belong to any player.

=== Gameplay ===
The game starts with Qin, the white kingdom, and then the order of play is counterclockwise.

The mechanism of the game is similar to many chess variants: pieces have their own moves and may capture one another by displacement. Except for the cannon and go-between, all pieces capture the same way that they move. There is no check in this game (so, it is not mandatory to remove an attack on the general).

=== Moves of pieces ===
Note that pieces are placed at intersections.

Piece	Diagram	Description
General 将	\ / / ┃ / / /; / \ / ┃ / /; ━ / ━ / 將 / ━ / ━; / / / ┃ / \; / / / ┃ / / \	The general moves any distance orthogonally or diagonally (like a chess queen).
Chancellor 偏	/ / ┃; / / ┃; ━ / ━ / 偏 / ━ / ━; / / ┃; / / ┃	The chancellor moves any distance orthogonally (like a chess rook).
Diplomat 裨	\ / / / / /; / \ / / /; / / 裨; / / / / \; / / / / / \	The diplomat moves any distance diagonally (like a chess bishop).
Cannon 砲	/ / ┃; / / ┃; ━ / ━ / 砲 / ━ / ━; / / ┃; / / ┃	The cannon moves any distance orthogonally without capturing. To capture, it jumps exactly one piece in its way (like a xiangqi cannon).
Go-between 行人	\ / / ┃ / / /; / \ / ┃ / /; ━ / ━ / 人 / ━ / ━; / / / ┃ / \; / / / ┃ / / \	The go-between moves any distance orthogonally or diagonally. It cannot capture nor can it be captured. Thus, it is used for defense, or for a cannon to jump.
Dagger Soldier 刀	○ / / ○; / 刀; ○ / / ○	The dagger soldier moves one intersection diagonally.
Swordsman 劍	/ ○; ○ / 劍 / ○; / ○	The swordsman moves one intersection orthogonally.
Archer 弓	④ / / / / ④ / / / / ④; / ③ / / / ③ / / / ③; / / ② / / ② / / ②; / / / ① / ① / ①; ④ / ③ / ② / ① / 弓 / ① / ② / ③ / ④; / / / ① / ① / ①; / / ② / / ② / / ②; / ③ / / / ③ / / / ③; ④ / / / / ④ / / / / ④	The archer moves up to four intersections orthogonally or diagonally.
Crossbowman 弩	⑤ / / / / / ⑤ / / / / / ⑤; / ④ / / / / ④ / / / / ④; / / ③ / / / ③ / / / ③; / / / ② / / ② / / ②; / / / / ① / ① / ①; ⑤ / ④ / ③ / ② / ① / 弩 / ① / ② / ③ / ④ / ⑤; / / / / ① / ① / ①; / / / ② / / ② / / ②; / / ③ / / / ③ / / / ③; / ④ / / / / ④ / / / / ④; ⑤ / / / / / ⑤ / / / / / ⑤	The crossbowman moves up to five intersections orthogonally or diagonally.
Knight 騎	/ ③ / / / / / / ③; ③ / / ② / / / / ② / / ③; / ② / / ① / / ① / / ②; / / ① / / □ / / ①; / / / □ / 騎 / □; / / ① / / □ / / ①; / ② / / ① / / ① / / ②; ③ / / ② / / / / ② / / ③; / ③ / / / / / / ③	The knight moves one intersection orthogonally first, then continues one to three intersections diagonally outward. It can be blocked like a xiangqi knight.
Emperor 周		The emperor does not move and cannot be captured.

=== Victory ===
A player is out when he loses his general or more than 10 pieces. The player who captures the general or the most pieces of the loser wins his remaining army. The final victory goes to the first player who wins two kingdoms or captures more than 30 pieces.

== See also ==
- Game of the Three Kingdoms
