= Chongqing People's Auditorium =

Building in Yuzhong, Chongqing, China

Coordinates: 29°33′42″N 106°33′14″E

- Simplified Chinese: 重庆市人民大礼堂
- Traditional Chinese: 重慶市人民大禮堂
Transcriptions
Standard Mandarin
- Hanyu Pinyin: Chóngqìng shì rénmín dà lǐtáng

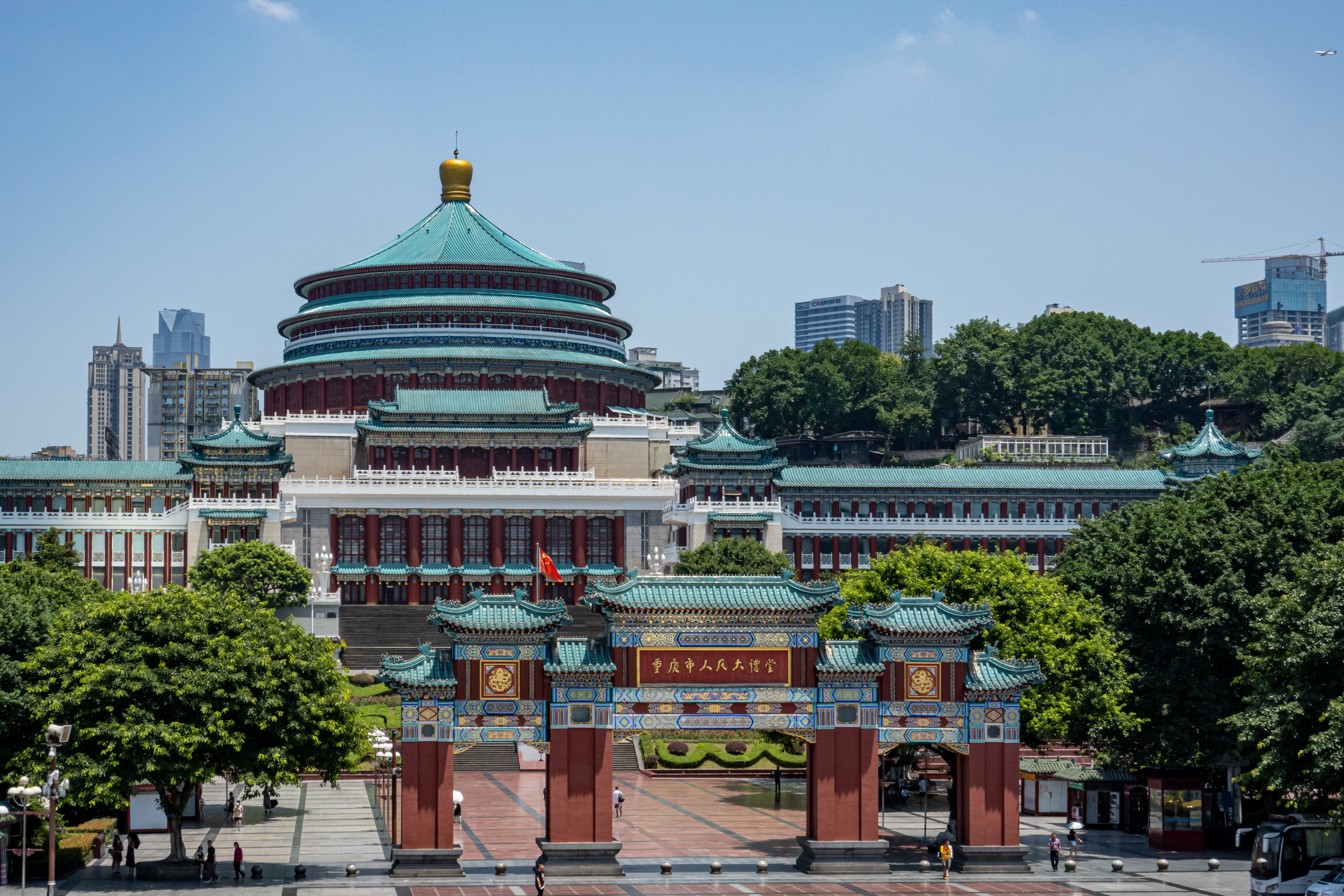
The Chongqing People's Auditorium, viewed from the People's Square near the Three Gorges Museum.

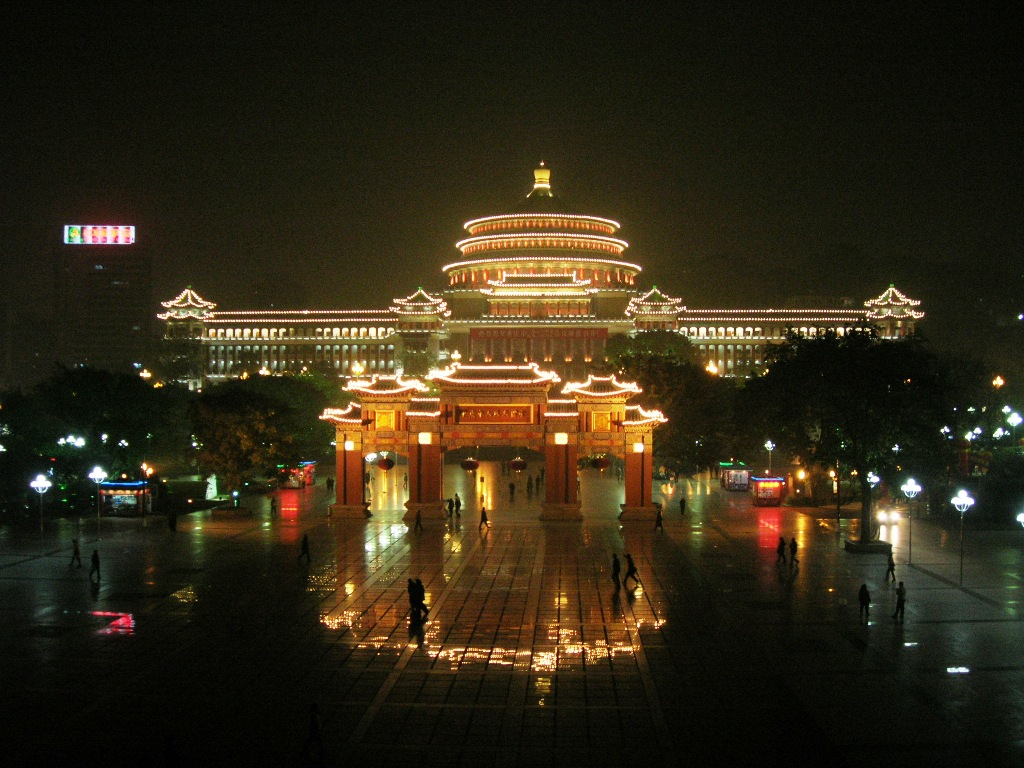
The Chongqing People's Auditorium at night.

The Chongqing People's Auditorium (Chinese: 重庆市人民大礼堂) is a large hall for major meetings and events, located in Yuzhong, Chongqing, China.

Construction of the hall began in June 1951 and completed in April 1954, with the involvement of Liu Bocheng, Deng Xiaoping and He Long who were the leaders of the Communist Party's Southwest Bureau (西南局) at the time. The building includes a large auditorium and three adjoining parts to the east, south, and north. It covers a total area of 66,000 m^{2}. The auditorium covers 18,500 m^{2}. The building is 65 meters (213 ft) high. The circular domed auditorium is 55 meters (180 ft) high and its internal diameter is 46.33 meters (152 ft 0 in). The auditorium is encircled by five storeys of additional viewing areas and has a seating capacity of 4,200 people. The building is symmetric, with colonnades and wings.

The building can be viewed from the People's Square below. Opposite is the Three Gorges Museum. It is currently the meeting place of the municipal legislative bodies – the Chongqing Municipal People's Congress (Renda) and People's Political Consultative Conference (Zhengxie).

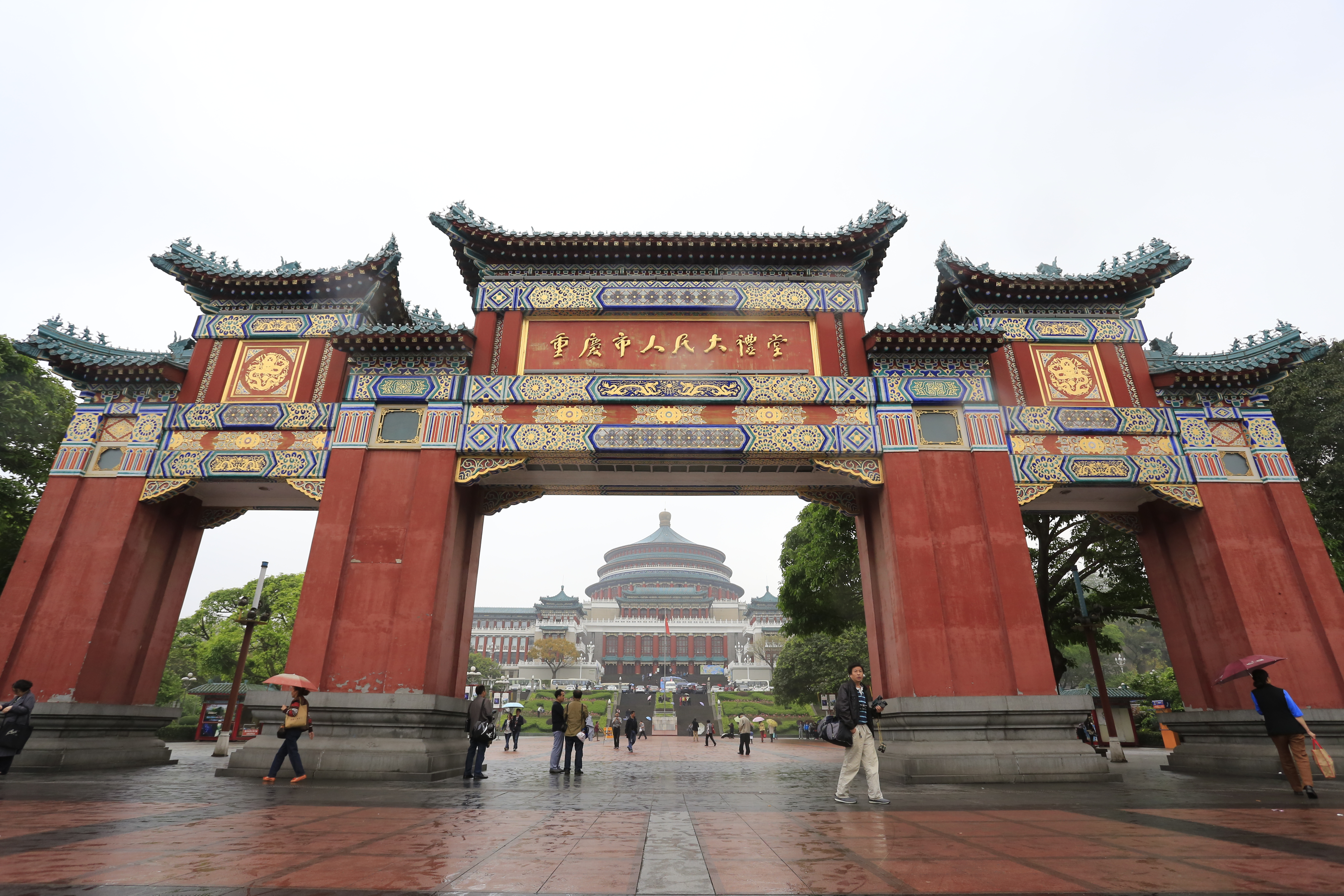
Paifang arch

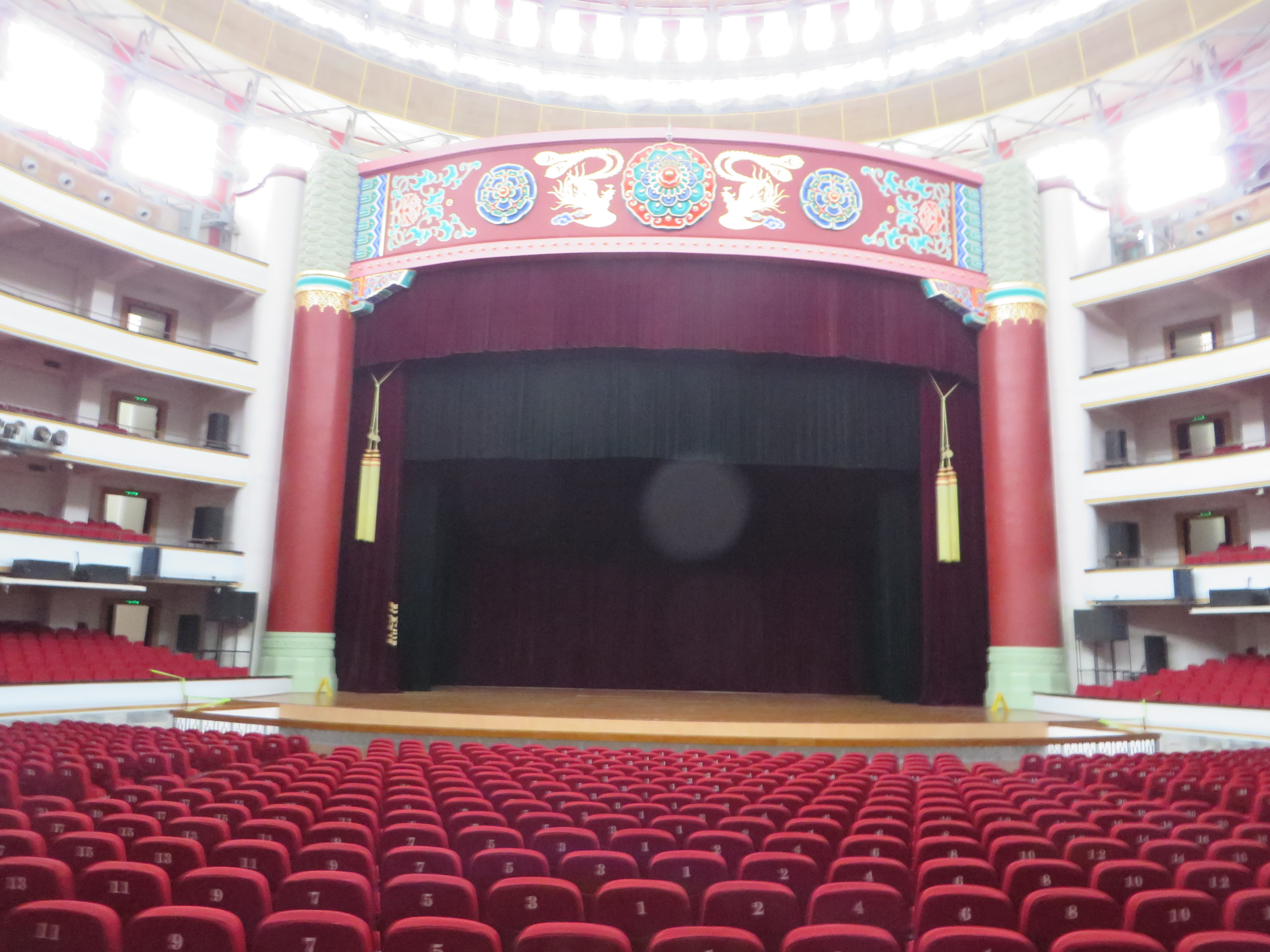
Interior of the main hall

== See also ==
- Great Hall of the People, Beijing
