= Xiang Jing =

Xiang Jing (Chinese: 象经) is a book about a Chinese board game. Xiang Jing was written in 569 CE by Emperor Wu of Northern Zhou, who was a great fan of race games.
