= Three Gorges Museum =

Museum in Chongqing, China

Coordinates: 29°33′43″N 106°33′02″E

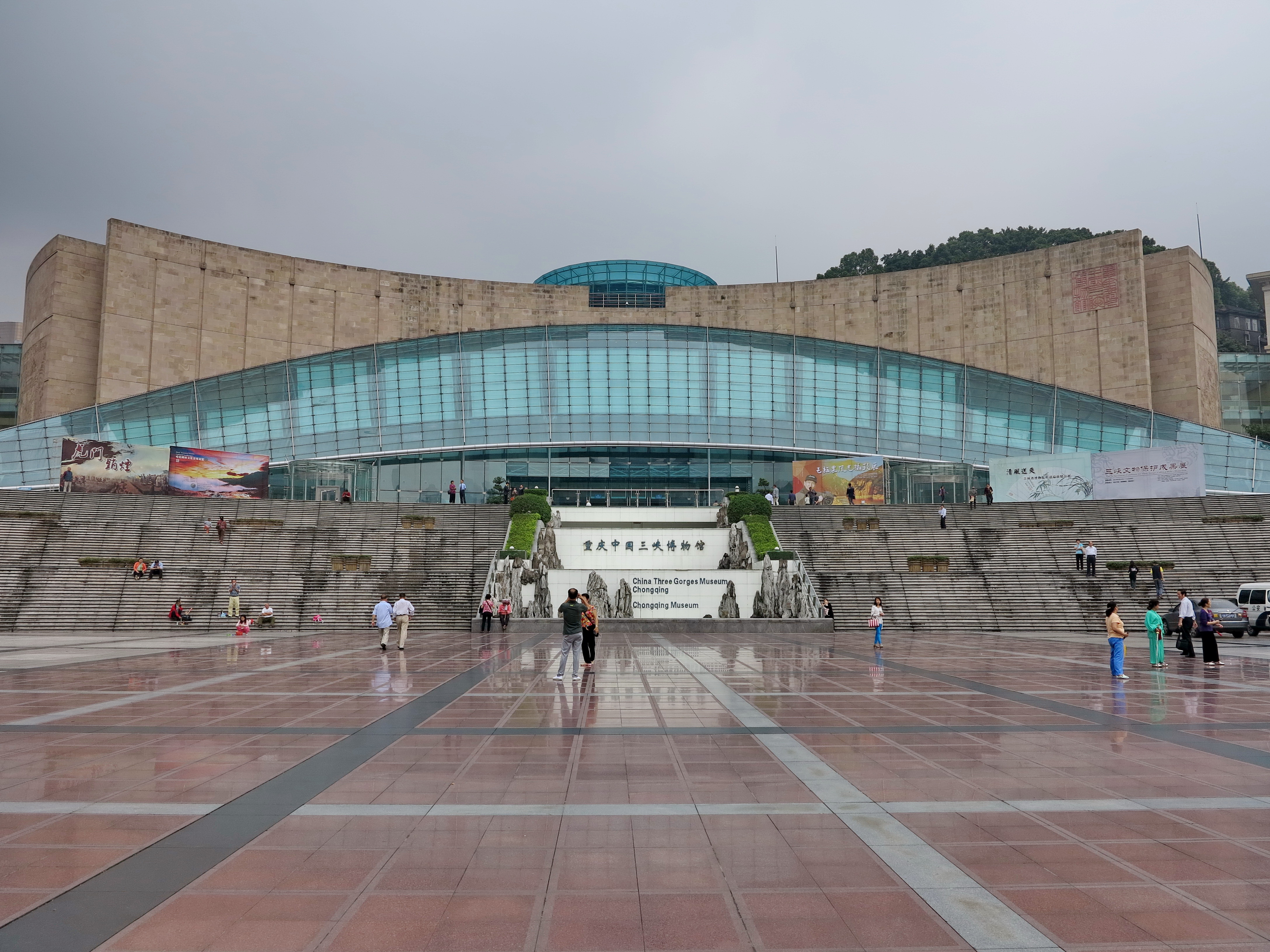
- Simplified Chinese: 重庆中国三峡博物馆
- Traditional Chinese: 重慶中國三峽博物館
- Literal meaning: Chongqing, China Three Gorges Museum
Transcriptions
Standard Mandarin
- Hanyu Pinyin: Chóngqìng Zhōngguó Sānxiá Bówùguǎn

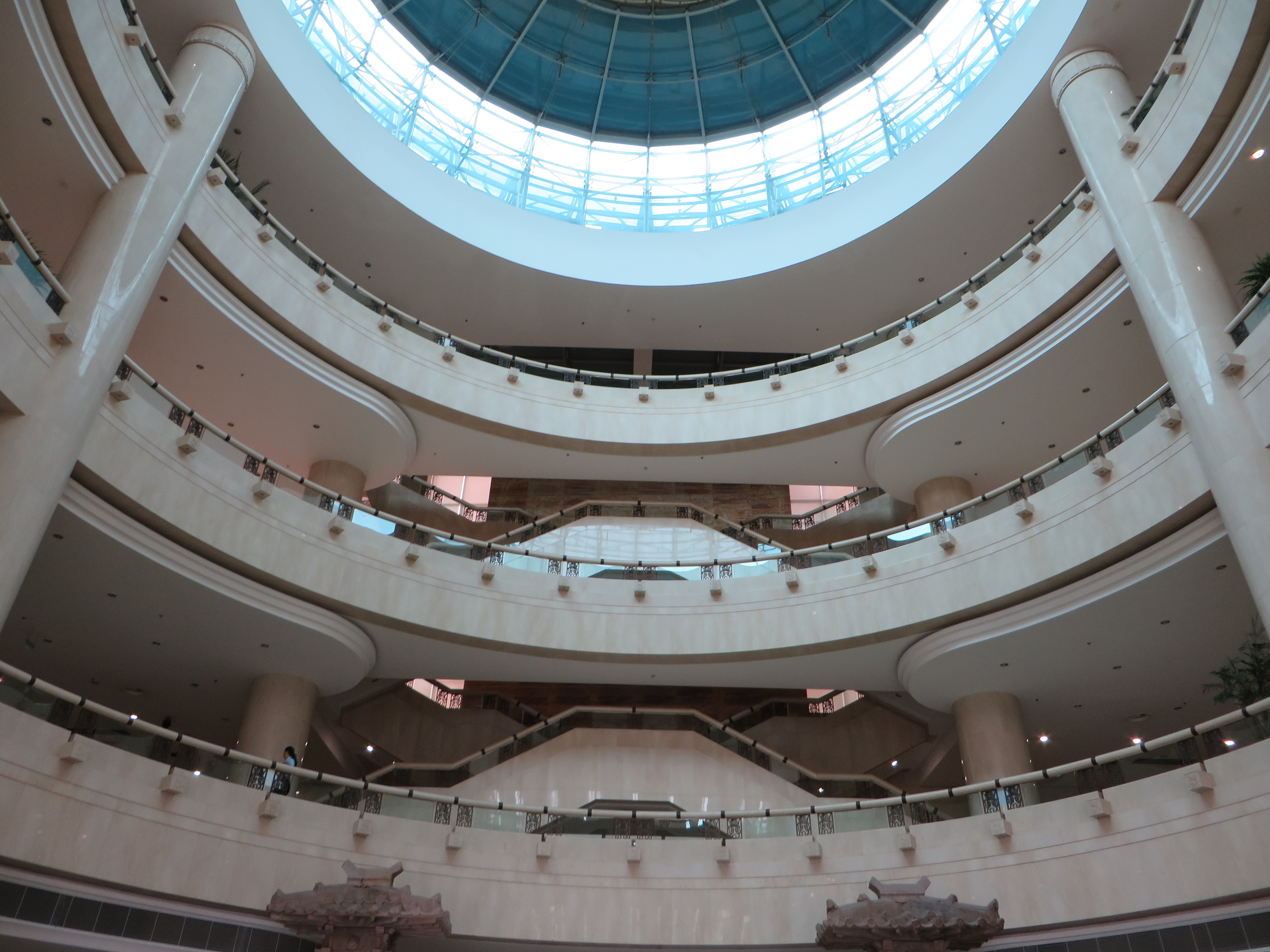
Atrium of the Three Gorges Museum

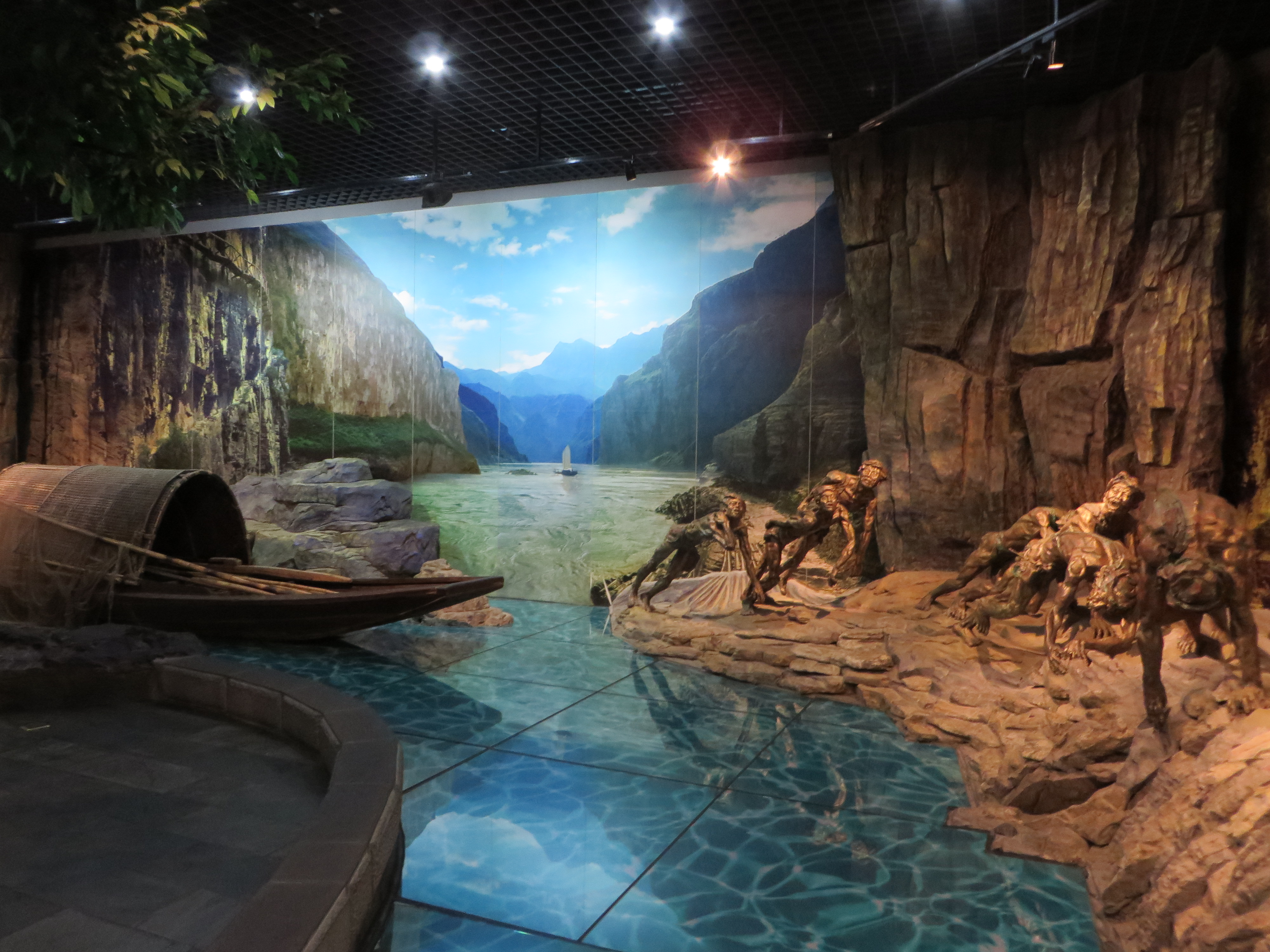
Three Gorges gallery display in the museum

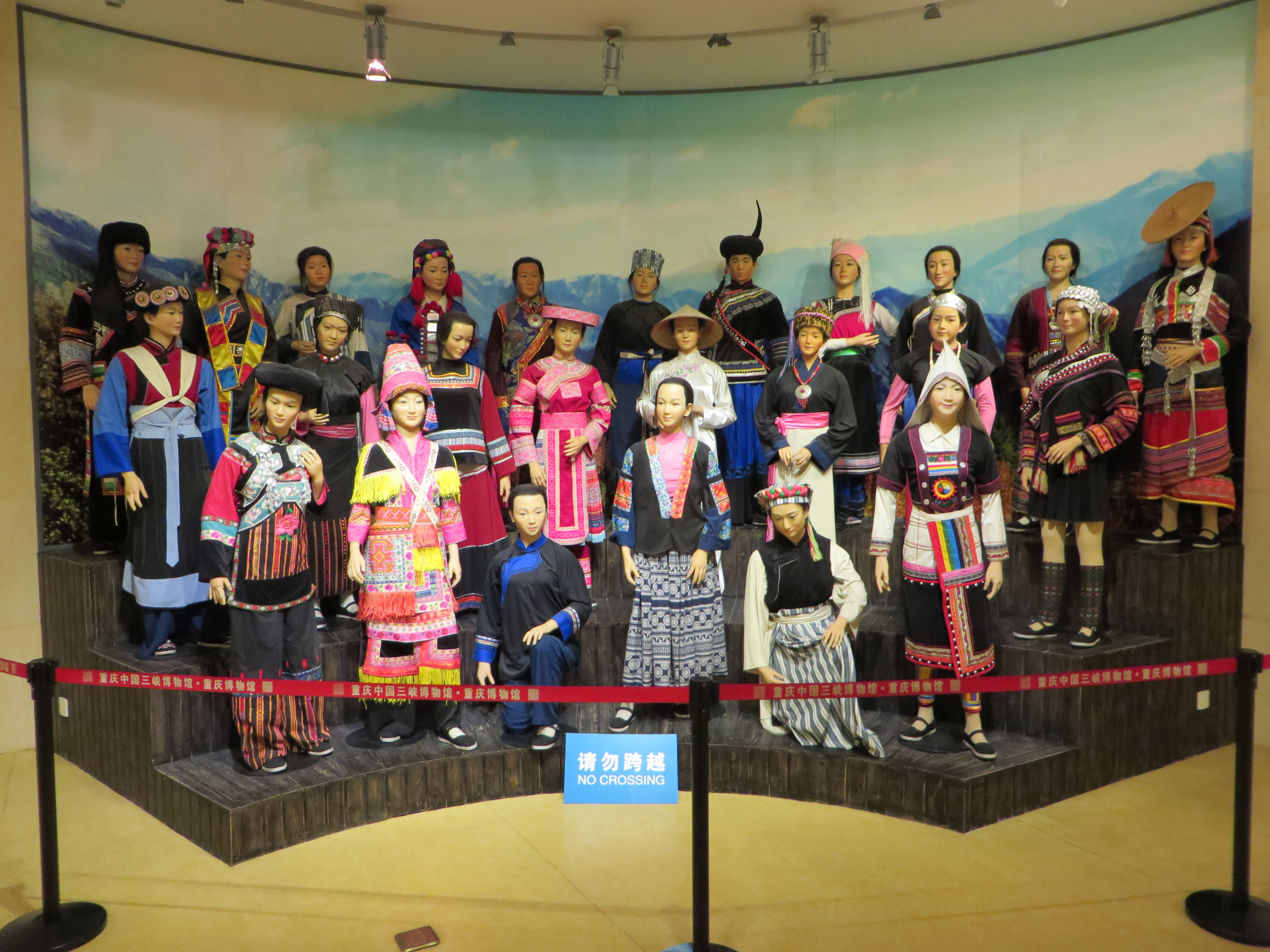
Traditional costumes display in the museum

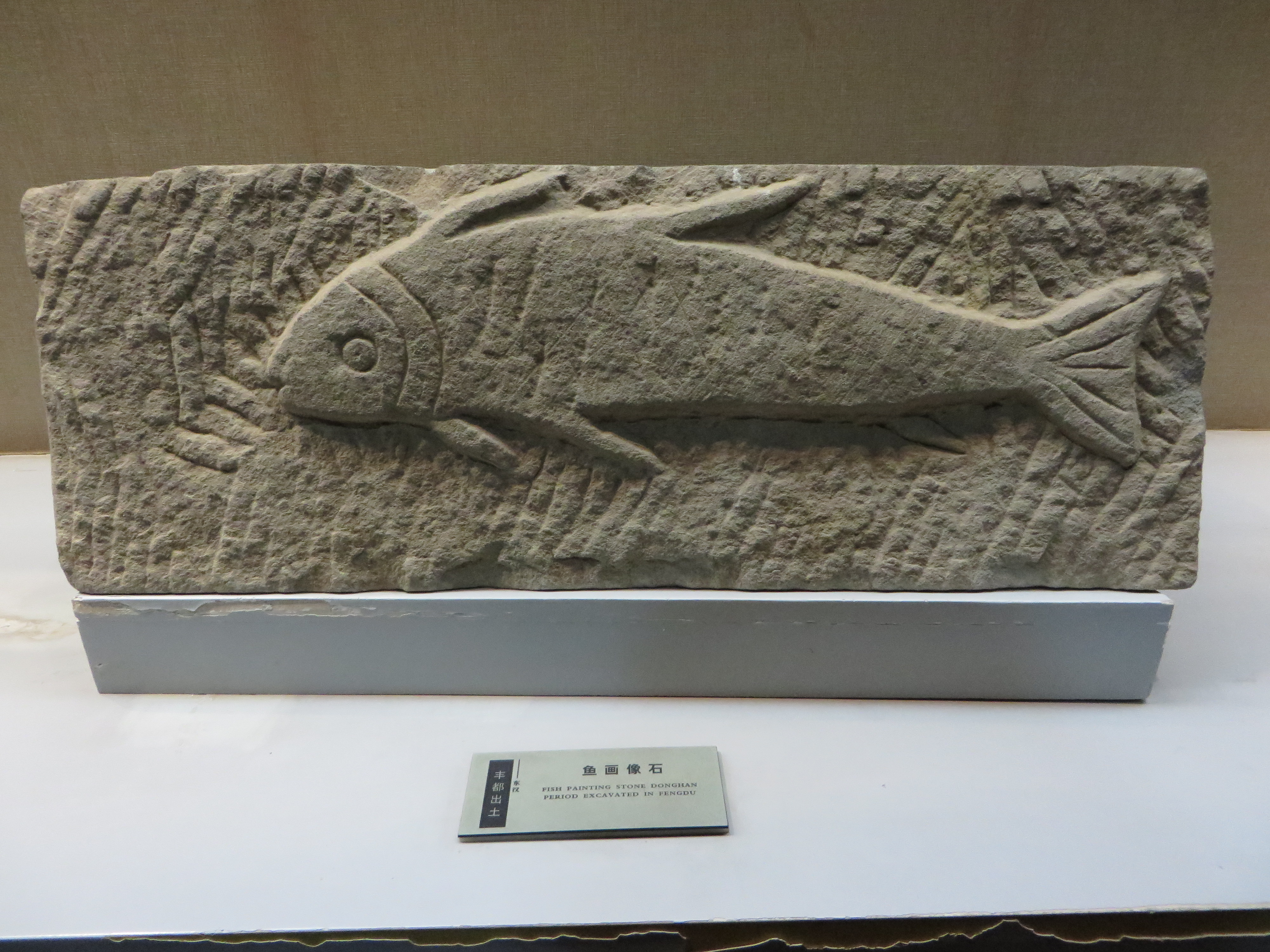
Fish rock carving from the Fengdu County on display in the museum

The Three Gorges Museum (Chinese: 重庆中国三峡博物馆) is a museum in the Yuzhong District of Chongqing, about the Three Gorges and Chongqing. It is one of the largest museums in the country.

The museum opened in 2005, replacing the former Chongqing Museum. It is located near the Chongqing People's Hall. It aims to undertake education, preservation, and scientific research with respect to cultural heritage and the natural environment in Chongqing and the Three Gorges region of the Yangtze River.

The exterior of the museum has sloping walls and is topped by a large glass dome. There are bronze sculptures, large reliefs, and 1-km (1,094 yards) long "Ecological Corridor".

The museum covers an area of 42,497 m^{2} (c. 50,828 square yards). The exhibition hall covers 23,225 m^{2} (c. 27,778 square yards). There are four main displays:

1. Glorious Three Gorges
2. Ancient Ba-Yu – early history of Chongqing
3. Chongqing: the City Road – 20th century history
4. The Anti-Japanese War (1937–1945)

Further displays include:

- Painting and calligraphy
- Porcelain
- Coins
- Sculpture from the Han dynasty (206 BCE –220 CE)
- Folk customs of southwest China
- Cultural objects given by Li Chuli

Another major exhibit is a 180° panorama of wartime Chongqing when it was the provisional capital of Free China and was subjected to Japanese bombardment. There is also a 360° cinema showing the natural and social scenery of the Three Gorges before the dam was constructed. A 1st-floor exhibition on the Three Gorges includes a model of the Three Gorges Dam.

== See also ==
- Baiheliang Underwater Museum
- Chongqing Zoo
- History of Chongqing
