= Chongqing Municipal People's Congress =

Chongqing Municipal People's Congress 重庆市人民代表大会 Chóngqìng Shì Rénmín Dàibiǎo Dàhuì
- 5th Chongqing Municipal People's Congress

Type
- Type: Province-level people's congress

Leadership
- Director: Zhang Xuan, CPC since January 2013
- Deputy Directors: Liu Xuepu, Zhou Xun, Du Liming, Shen Jinqiang, Zhang Dingyu, Xia Zuxiang, Wang Yue, CPC
- Secretary-general: Long Hua, CPC
- Seats: 860

Elections
- Chongqing Municipal People's Congress voting system: Plurality-at-large voting & Two-round system

Meeting place
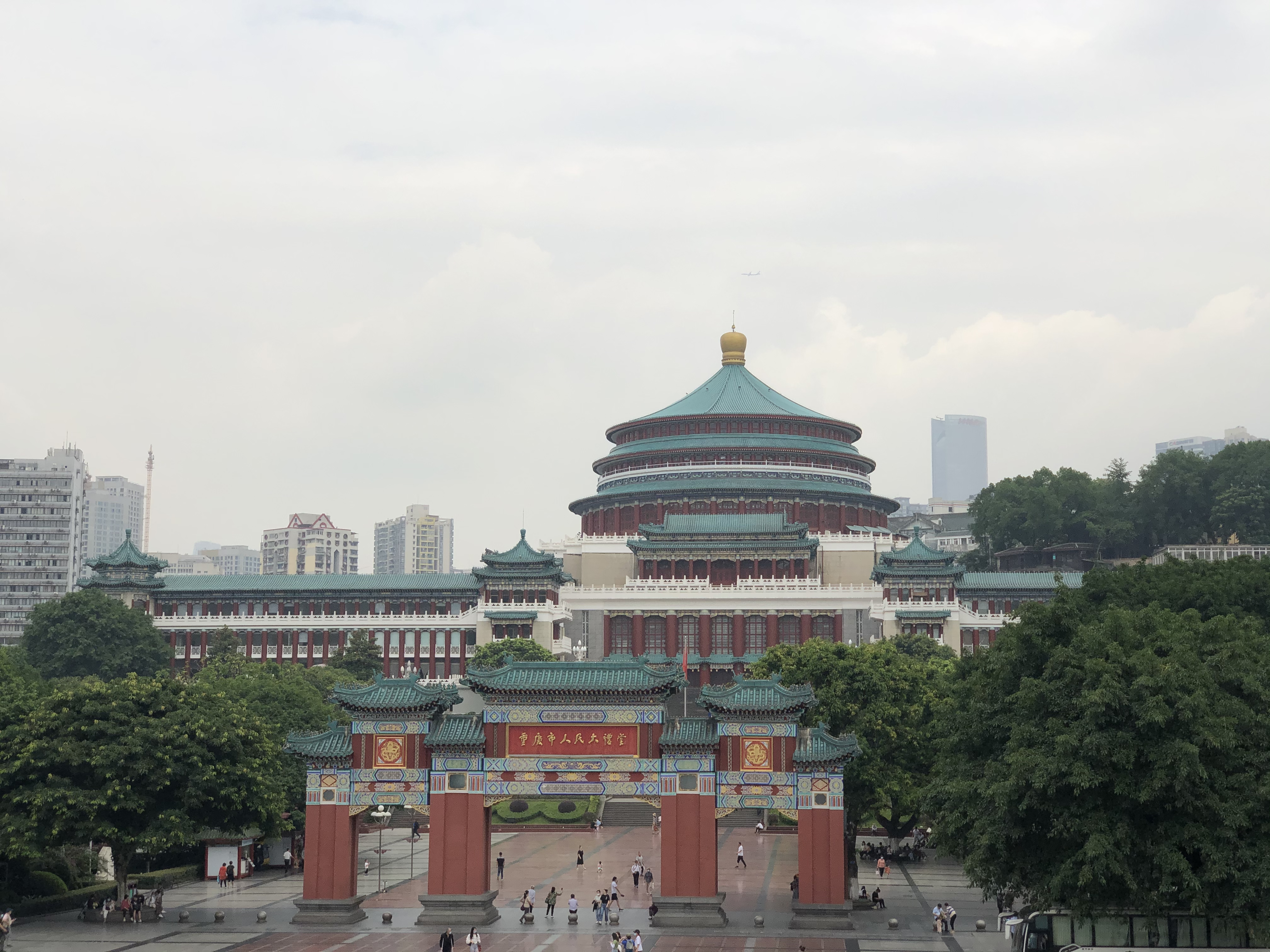
- Great Hall of the People

Website
- cqrd.gov.cn

Chongqing Municipality People's Congress
- Simplified Chinese: 重庆市人民代表大会
- Traditional Chinese: 重慶市人民代表大會
Transcriptions
Standard Mandarin
- Hanyu Pinyin: Chóngqìng Shì Rénmín Dàibiǎo Dàhuì

The Chongqing Municipal People's Congress is the local people's congress of Chongqing. The Municipal People's Congress is elected for a term of five years. The meetings of the Chongqing Municipal People's Congress are held at least once a year in the Great Hall of the People. After a proposal by more than one-fifth of the deputies, a meeting of the people's congress at the corresponding level may be convened temporarily.

== Powers and duties ==
1. Ensure the compliance and implementation of the Constitution, laws, administrative regulations, and the resolutions of the higher people's congress and its standing committee, and ensure the implementation of the national plan and national budget
2. Review and approve the national economic and social development plans, budgets and report on their implementation
3. Discuss and decide on major issues related to politics, economy, education, science, culture, health, environment and resource protection, civil affairs, ethnicity, etc...
4. Elect of the members of the Standing Committee of the Chongqing People's Congress
5. Election of governor, deputy governor, chairman and vice chairman of autonomous region, mayor, deputy mayor, governor, deputy governor, county governor, deputy governor, district governor, deputy governor
6. Election of the president of the people's court and the Chief Procurator of the People's Procuratorate at the same level; the elected Chief Procurator of the People's Procuratorate must be reported to the Chief Procurator of the People's Procuratorate at a higher level for approval by the Standing Committee of the Chongqing People's Congress
7. Election of deputies to the people's congress at a higher level
8. Listen to and review the work reports of the Standing Committee of the Chongqing People's Congress
9. Hear and review the work reports of the people's government, people's courts, and people's procuratorates
10. Change or revoke inappropriate resolutions of the Standing Committee of the Chongqing People's Congress
11. Revoke inappropriate decisions and orders of the people's government at the same level
12. Protect the socialist property owned by the whole people and collectively owned by the working people, protect the legal private property of citizens, maintain social order, and protect citizens' personal rights, democratic rights and other rights
13. Protect the legitimate rights and interests of various economic organizations
14. Protect the rights of ethnic minorities
15. Guarantee the rights of equality between men and women, equal pay for equal work and freedom of marriage granted to women by the Constitution and laws

== Directors ==
1. Wang Yunlong (王云龙): 1997－2002
2. Huang Zhendong (黄镇东): 2003－2007
3. Chen Guangguo (陈光国): 2008－2012
4. Zhang Xuan (张轩): 2013－present

== See also ==
- Politics of Chongqing
- System of people's congress
