= Three-dimensional chess =

Variants of chess with multiple boards at different levels

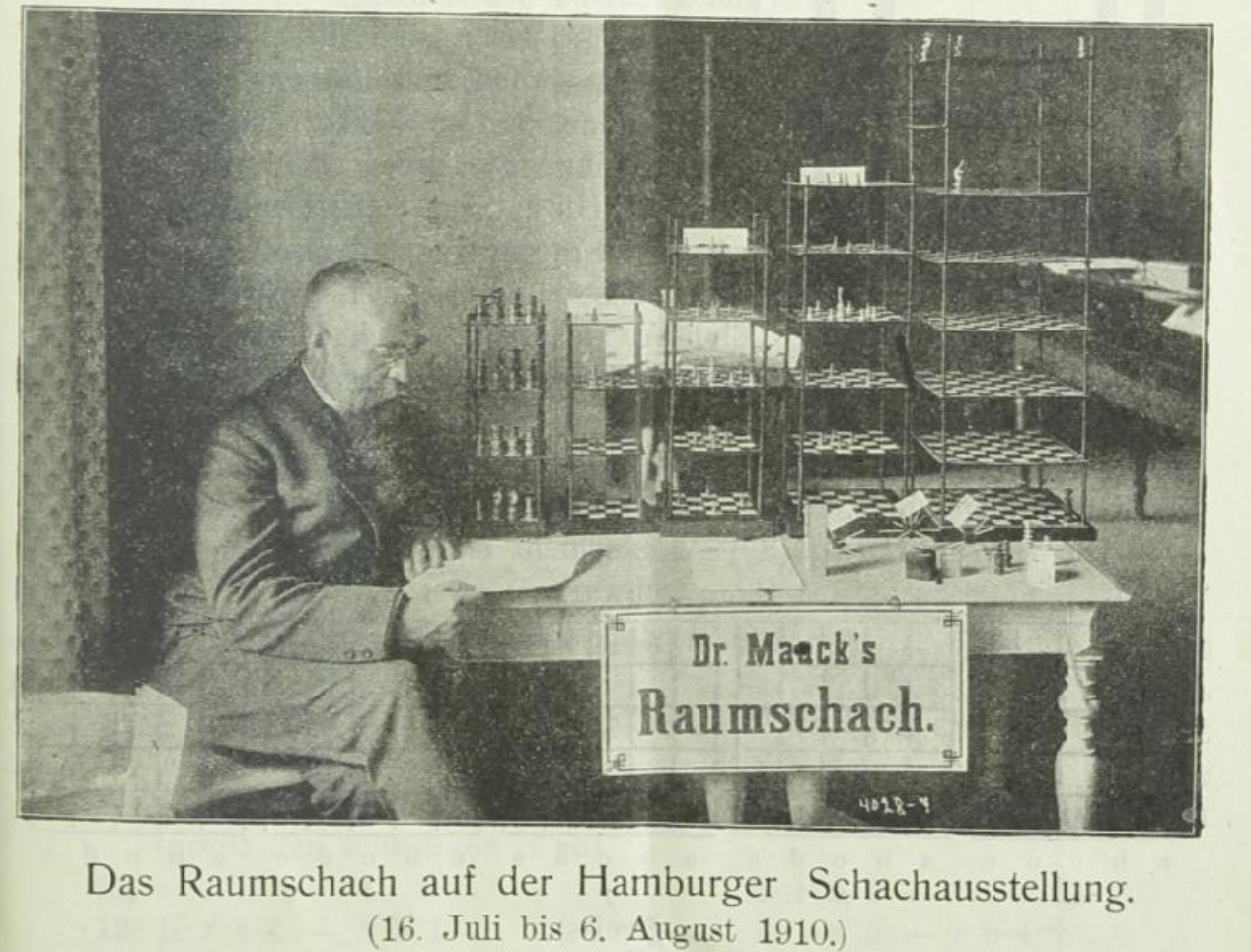
Ferdinand Maack demonstrating his various Raumschach variants at the Hamburg Chess Exhibition

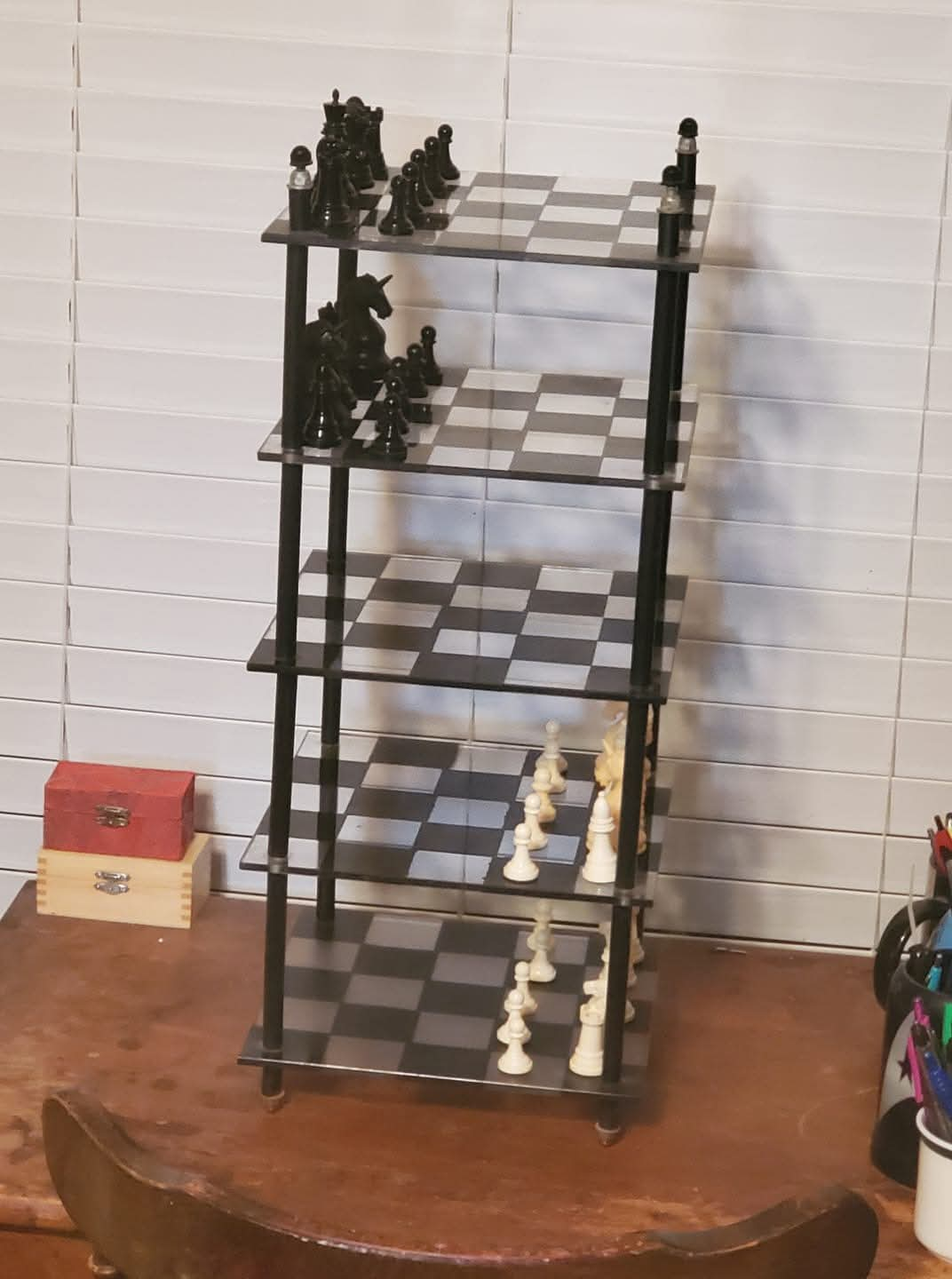
Raumschach (German for Space chess) set created by a hobbyist

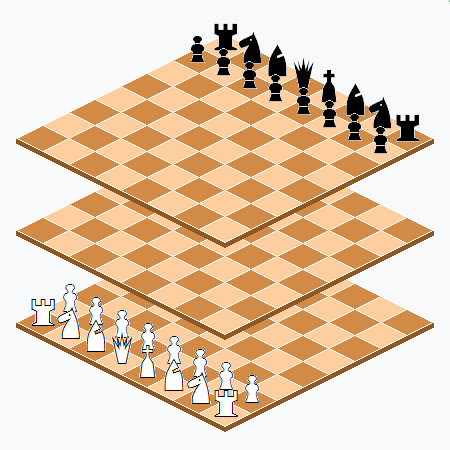
The 8×8×3 layout is a common play space in several modern 3D chess variants.

Three-dimensional chess (or 3D chess) refers to a family of chess variants that replaces the two-dimensional board with a three-dimensional array of cells, usually stacked chessboards. There are numerous 3D chess board arrays depending on the design of the specific game. Unlike standard chess, where pieces move solely on a single plane, 3D chess requires players to navigate across multiple levels, introducing a vertical z-axis to the game.

The expression "three-dimensional chess" is sometimes used as a colloquial metaphor to describe complex, dynamic systems with many competing entities and interests, including politics, diplomacy and warfare. To describe an individual as "playing three-dimensional chess" implies a higher-order understanding and mastery of the system beyond the comprehension of their peers or ordinary observers, who are implied to be playing "regular chess".

The basic rules of most 3D chess variants generally preserve the movement logic of traditional pieces while extending their range into the third dimension. For example, in many variants, a rook can move vertically through the levels as if traveling along a column. Capturing and checkmate remain the primary objectives, but the number of available squares and the complexity of the "lines of sight" make the 3D game significantly more difficult than two-dimensional versions. Some variants also introduce new pieces that take advantage of the three-dimensional play space.

Three-dimensional variants have existed since at least the late 19th century. One of the oldest and most enduring variants is Raumschach (German for "Space chess"), invented in 1907 by Ferdinand Maack, which uses five stacked 5×5 boards (though there were different board spaces designed). Maack's game is considered by chess variant enthusiasts to be the classic form of 3D chess. The game was played in clubs in Hamburg and London during the early 20th century. Numerous other variants of 3D chess have been invented since. David Pritchard's The Classified Encyclopedia of Chess Variants discusses some fifty 3D chess variations as well as a handful of higher-dimensional variants in Chapter 25. Chapter 11 also covers variants using multiple boards normally set side by side, which can also be considered to add an extra dimension to chess.

The modern cultural recognition of 3D chess is linked to the Star Trek franchise, which featured a "Tri-Dimensional Chess" set as a prop. The show provided no concrete rules, but fans and designers later codified various rule sets to make it playable. Subsequently, various Science fiction media have also featured some form of 3D chess as a prop or plot device, usually to indicate the intelligence of the players. The rising popularity of the concept also led to various commercial products using 8×8×3 layout (three stacked boards), including a 3D Chess game published in 1967 by Dimensional Games, Inc, as well as Strato Chess (1973) by Dynamic Games and Space Chess (1970) by Pacific Game Co. According to Pritchard, the variants that use a 8×8×3 layout or boards smaller than 8×8 are "less demanding on spatial vision, and hence more practical".

== Early history ==
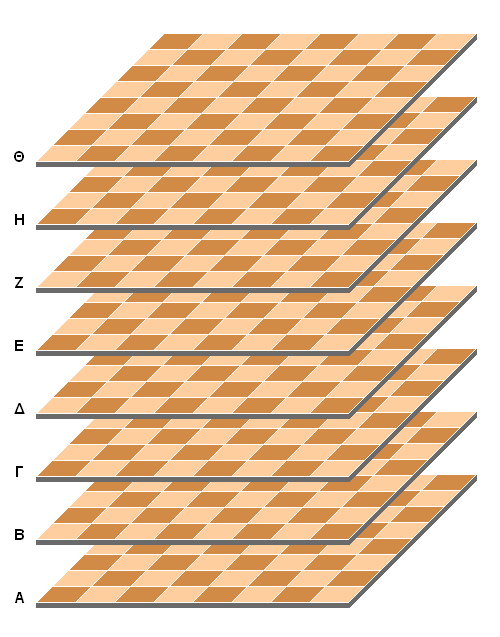
Kubikschach 8×8×8 gamespace

Perhaps the first extension of chess into a three-dimensional space was accomplished by Alexandre-Théophile Vandermonde in 1771. Vandermonde is known for his unique chess problem, which was extension of the knight's tour into a 4×4×4 playing field.

There are various reports of Baltic-German chess master Lionel Kieseritzky (1806–1853) demonstrating a game called Kubikschach (Cube chess) to the German master Adolf Anderssen at a London tournament. This game was also reported on in the Deutsche Schachzeitung. However, the exact rules and playing setup for Kubikschach are unknown. It is also unknown who exactly designed this game, though it is often assumed it was designed by Kieseritzky himself and various publications list him as the inventor.

Kubikschach influenced Ferdinand Maack in his development of Raumschach, and he discusses Kubikschach in his first Raumschach periodical. However, we know almost nothing about the rules and configuration of the board for this game.

== Raumschach ==
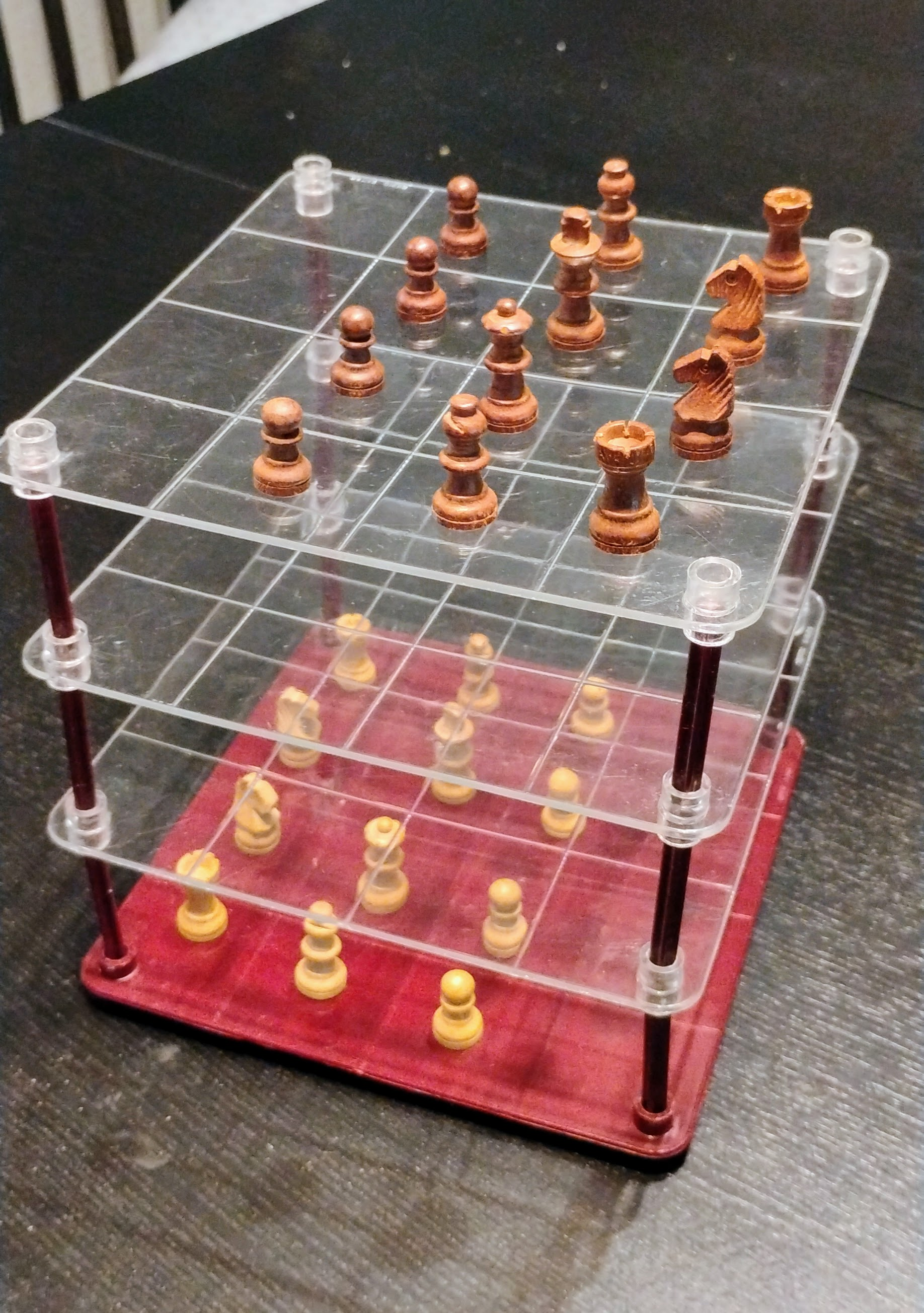
An implementation of Maack's Four Level Raumschach (4×4×4) game using a Qubic board

The German mathematician Ferdinand Maack (1861–1930) developed Raumschach (German for "Space chess", also called Schachraumspiel) in the early 1900s, patenting it with the German Imperial Patent Office in 1907. Maack contended that for chess to be more like modern war, attack should be possible from above and below, writing: "if the analogy to war is to be maintained, the third dimension is required. Modern strategy, with its steerable airships and submarines, uses the whole of space. Thus, in chess, attacks from above and below must be made possible" (Anleitung zum Raumschach).

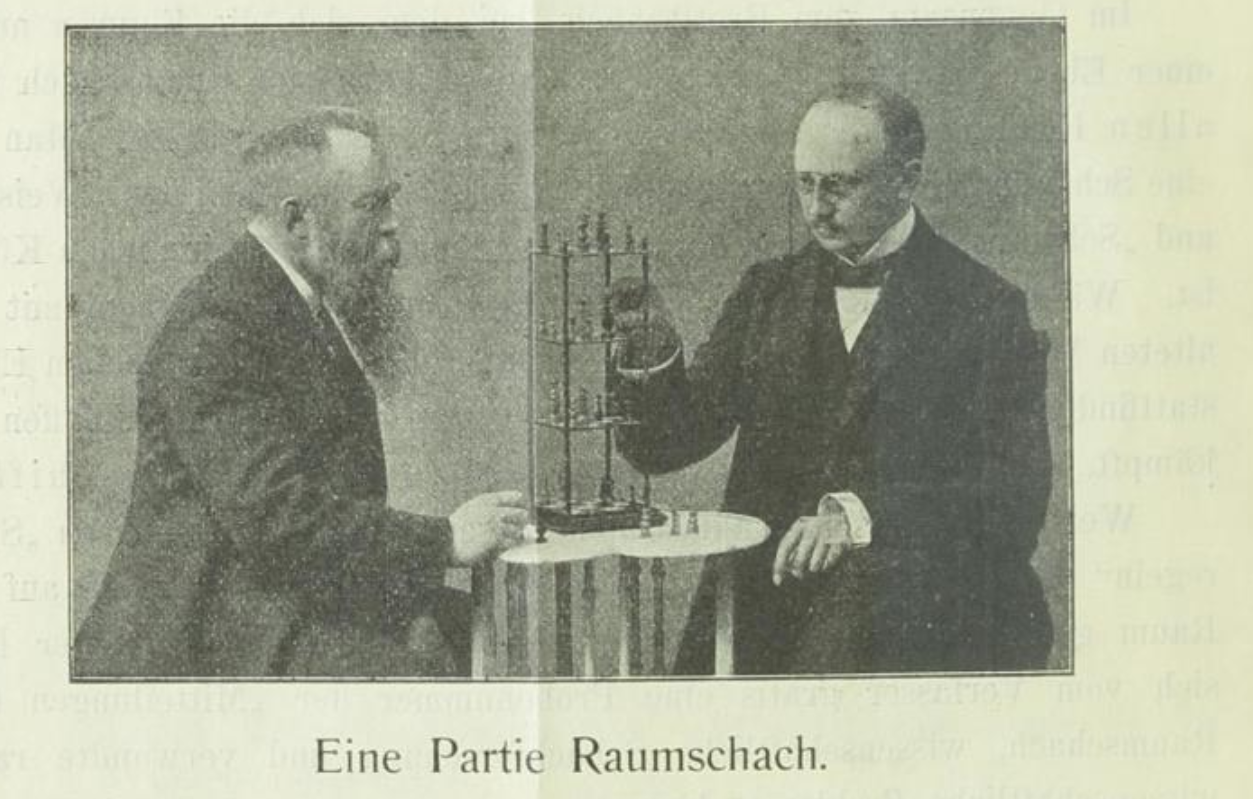
Raumschach game from Maack's Spielregeln zum Raumschach (1913)

Maack's original formulation presented in 1907 was for an 8×8×8 board, as with Cubic chess. He labeled each plane with Greek letters (with Alpha as the lowest board and Theta as the highest). However, the long and difficult games that arose from the 8×8×8 space led Maack to experiment with numerous other smaller play spaces over the course of the following years. Maack eventually settled on a 5×5×5 playing field as the best, though he also taught a version played on a 4×4×4 space. Other obvious differences between standard chess and Raumschach include two additional pawns per player, and a special piece (two per player) called the unicorn. The unicorn has a special triagonal move which can shift one space in rank, file and level. In Spielregeln zum Raumschach (1913), Maack explains the rules for two main versions: a "five level game" (5×5×5) and a "four level game" (played on a 4×4×4 board).

Maack promoted the game with demonstrations, articles, magazines and several books, such as Das Schachraumspiel: Dreidimensionales Schachspiel (1907), Spielregeln zum Raumschach (Rules of Space Chess) and Raumschach: Einführung in die Spielpraxis (1919). An article first appeared in a 1907 edition of the Frankfurter Zeitung, though the reception was initially mixed. Spielregeln zum Raumschach also states that sets of the game were available at German toy stores. Maack gave the first public presentation of the game in the 1907 International Chess Tournament in Carlsbad. Maack also edited and published a journal on the game called Mitteilungen über Raumschach und wissenschaftliche Schachforschung (Reports on Space Chess and Systematic Chess Research). Maack later founded the Hamburg Raumschach Club (possibly 1909), which remained active until WW2. Members included chess problemists like Hans Klüver and Willibald Roese. Raumschach achieved some limited popularity in England and Germany in the early 20th century, and is considered to be the classic form of 3D chess.

Raumschach on Zillions of Games

Raumschach was studied in detail by Thomas Rayner Dawson (1889–1951), an English chess problemist. He wrote a series of articles in The Chess Amateur on the game (1926–27), and composed problems for it. Dawson also wrote a manuscript on Raumschach, which was picked up by Hans Gruber and Kjell Widlert, who published it in two parts under the title Raumschachfunken (Space Chess Sparks) in 1993 and 1995. Alexey Troitsky is also known to have studied the game and its endgame problems.

While Raumschach is not a widespread game, it has been implemented in several modern computer programs, including the Windows software Zillions of Games. Numerous variants for Raumschach have also been designed by fans and some are also accessible in the Zillions program.

=== Board and starting position ===
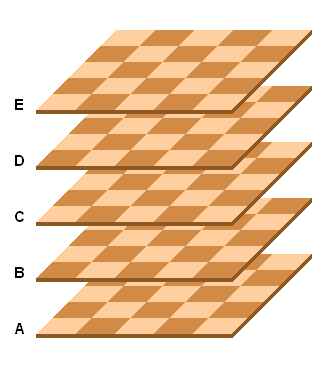
Raumschach 5×5×5 gamespace

Ea5 black rook	Eb5 black knight	Ec5 black king	Ed5 black knight	Ee5 black rook
Ea4 black pawn	Eb4 black pawn	Ec4 black pawn	Ed4 black pawn	Ee4 black pawn
Ea3	Eb3	Ec3	Ed3	Ee3
Ea2	Eb2	Ec2	Ed2	Ee2
Ea1	Eb1	Ec1	Ed1	Ee1

E

Da5 black unicorn	Db5 black bishop	Dc5 black queen	Dd5 black unicorn	De5 black bishop
Da4 black pawn	Db4 black pawn	Dc4 black pawn	Dd4 black pawn	De4 black pawn
Da3	Db3	Dc3	Dd3	De3
Da2	Db2	Dc2	Dd2	De2
Da1	Db1	Dc1	Dd1	De1

D

Ca5	Cb5	Cc5	Cd5	Ce5
Ca4	Cb4	Cc4 black circle	Cd4	Ce4 black circle
Ca3	Cb3	Cc3	Cd3 white cross	Ce3
Ca2	Cb2	Cc2 white cross	Cd2 white circle	Ce2 white cross
Ca1	Cb1	Cc1	Cd1	Ce1

C

Ba5	Bb5	Bc5	Bd5	Be5
Ba4	Bb4	Bc4	Bd4	Be4
Ba3	Bb3 black circle	Bc3 white cross	Bd3 white circle	Be3 white cross
Ba2 white pawn	Bb2 white pawn	Bc2 white pawn	Bd2 white pawn	Be2 white pawn
Ba1 white bishop	Bb1 white unicorn	Bc1 white queen	Bd1 white bishop	Be1 white unicorn

B

Aa5	Ab5	Ac5	Ad5	Ae5
Aa4	Ab4	Ac4	Ad4	Ae4
Aa3	Ab3	Ac3	Ad3	Ae3
Aa2 white pawn	Ab2 white pawn	Ac2 white pawn	Ad2 white pawn	Ae2 white pawn
Aa1 white rook	Ab1 white knight	Ac1 white king	Ad1 white knight	Ae1 white rook

A
Raumschach starting position. Unicorns are on Bb1, Be1, Da5 and Dd5. White's pawn on Bd2 can move to cells with a white dot or capture on cells marked "×". Black's unicorn on Dd5 can move to cells with a black dot or capture the white pawn on Aa2.

The Raumschach 3D board can be thought of as a cube sliced into five equal spaces across each of its three major coordinal planes. This sectioning yields a 5×5×5 (125 cube) game-space. The cubes (usually represented by squares and often called cells) alternate in color in all three dimensions.

The horizontal levels were originally denoted by Greek letters (Alpha α, Beta β, Gamma γ, Delta δ and Epsilon ε) in Maack's publications. Some English writings use capital letters A through E instead. Ranks and files of a level are denoted using standard chess algebraic notation.

As for the starting position, the armies are arrayed on four levels, two for each color. White starts on the α and β levels and Black starts on δ and ε.

=== Standard rules ===
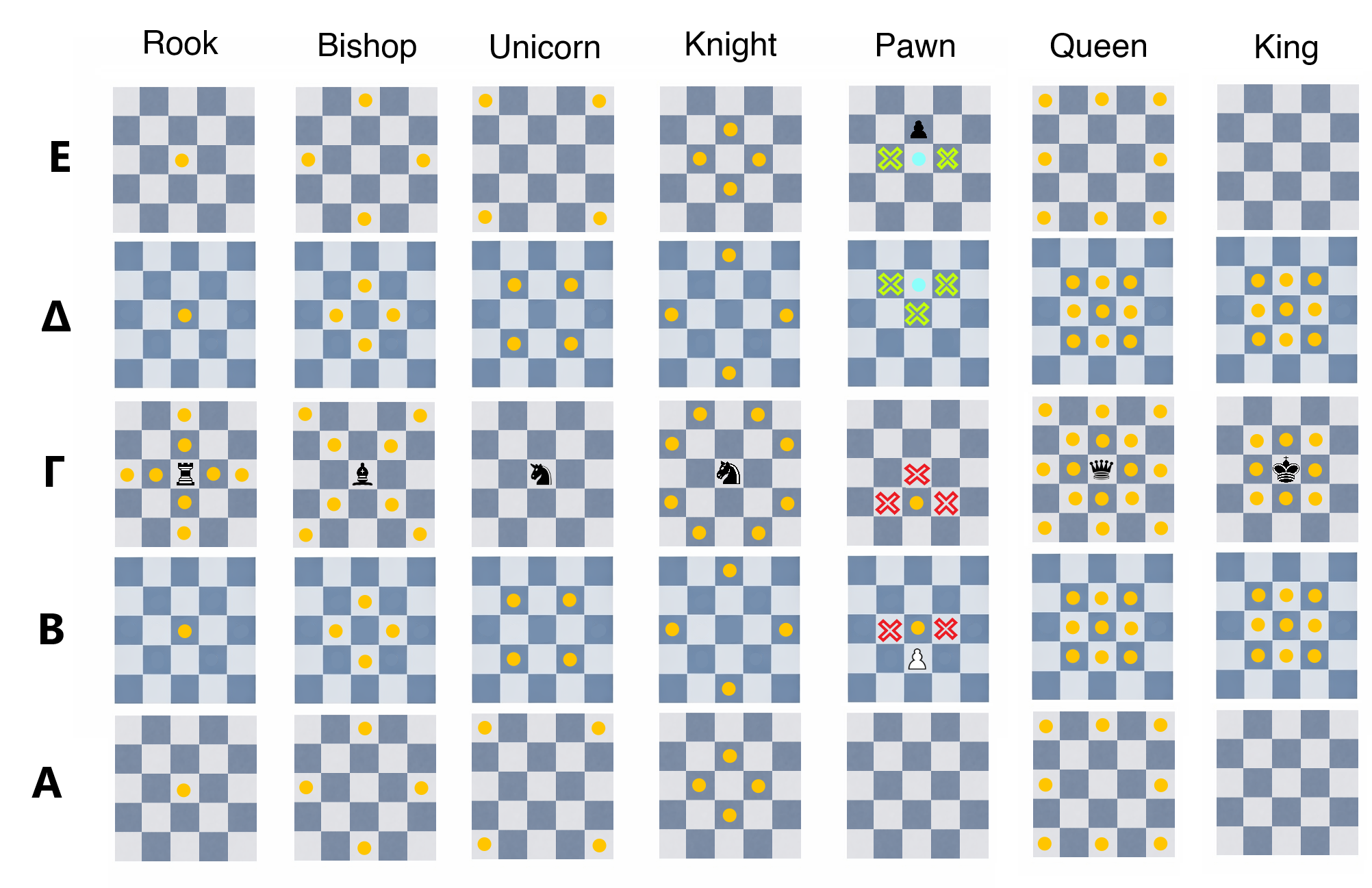
Raumschach piece movements, note the pawn here is shown with the "new" or "C" move set

While different rules have been used, the standard rules that the Hamburg Raumschach club settled on after the first world war are found in Maack, F. Raumschach: Einführung in die Spielpraxis (1919). They are the following:

White moves first. The game objective, as in standard chess, is checkmate. Rooks, bishops and knights move as they do in chess in any given plane. The three dimensional movements are as follows:

- A rook slides any number of cells through the six faces of a cube in any rank, file, or column. It moves in the third dimension as if ascending or descending on an elevator.
- A bishop moves as a classic bishop when moving two dimensionally. When moving in the third dimension, it moves through the twelve edges of a cube, going up and down as if moving on a staircase.
- A knight makes a (0,1,2) leap (the same effect as one step as a rook followed by one step as a bishop in the same outward direction) enabling it to control 24 different cells from the board's center. The knight is the only piece that can leap over any pieces in its path.
- A unicorn moves in a manner unique to a 3D space: it moves through the corners of a cube or vertices (i.e. along a space diagonal), any number of steps in a straight line. It has no two dimensional movement and moves purely triagonally in the third dimension. Each unicorn can reach a total of 30 cells of the 125-cell gamespace; each player's pair can reach 60.
- The queen combines the moves of a rook, bishop and unicorn. The queen has a total of 26 different directions to move: 6 faces plus 12 edges plus 8 corners.
- The king moves the same as the queen but one step at a time. Thus, it can move one step in any of the adjacent 26 cells through the faces, edges and vertices of its own cell/cube.
- The pawn moves one step as a rook and captures edge-wise as a bishop, but only towards its corresponding promotion rank (the starting rank of its opposing king). Thus pawns cannot move or capture backward (towards their own starting position) nor can white pawns move "down" a level or black pawns "up" a level (since their respective promotion ranks are in the opposite direction). This is the "standard" move set for pawns, for other variations used see below.
- There is no pawn initial two-step move (and consequently no capturing en passant).
- There is no castling.

=== Variant move sets ===
Regarding the pawn, the key principle is that they move one step like a rook or capture one step like the bishop. However, Maack and the Hamburg space chess club played with four different move sets for the pawns. There seems to have been much discussion and testing around the movement of the pawn, as Maack writes in Raumschach: Einführung in die Spielpraxis that "from the very beginning, the greatest difficulties and the liveliest controversies among space-chess players have arisen in answering the two questions: How are the pawns to move? and how are the pieces to be set up at the beginning of the game?"

The four options outlined by Maack in Einführung in die Spielpraxis are as follows:

- Pawn Movement A, the "old" movement: A pawn moves one step like a rook or captures one step like the bishop, but only forwards towards the promotion rank and not backwards, although it can move from bottom to top and vice versa. "Backwards" is defined here as the home rank of its king. In other words, the pawn cannot move towards the rank of his own king when moving on the y axis (which is also the rank where the opponent's pawn can promote), but it can move or capture one step up or down on the z axis as it likes. It also does not capture sideways when moving up or down, only towards the front edge. In Raumschach: Einführung in die Spielpraxis Maack argues that this option which has the pawn "move in three directions and capture in four directions" is the best option, and that this has been play-tested for years by the Hamburg club. Maack also says that this movement is "recommended for beginners".
- Pawn Movement B, the "restricted" movement: A more restricted form of move A in which pawns only move and capture toward the promotion rank (rank E5 for White, rank A1 for Black). This includes moving one step directly upward (for White) or downward (for Black), and capturing one step diagonally upward (White) or diagonally downward (Black), through a front or side cube edge. This is the most restrictive move, since it removes the pawn's freedom to move as it likes on the z axis, forcing it to always move towards its promotion rank on the z and y axes.
- Movement C, the "new" movement: This move is similar to B, but also allows capturing sideways upward. Maack says this is the "new method of play" that was adopted by the Hamburg club after years of play and was "vigorously advocated by perceptive and unprejudiced strong players and composers well known in the official chess world", including Hans Klüver and Wilhelm Roese.
- Movement D, the "all-sided" move: A pawn moves one step like a rook or captures one step like the bishop in all directions without restrictions. When this move set is used, pawns cannot promote. In Anleitung zum Raumschach (1908), in his discussion of the game played on 8×8×8, Maack explains that this pawn move thus: "through the faces like the rook, one step each. They capture through the edges like the bishop, one step each. They move and capture in all directions."

Maack also discusses various options for the movement of the knight, including allowing the knight to move as a unicorn and a 2D knight.

The four level game on 4×4×4 can be played with four different army configurations:

- With two standard 3D knights
- With one knight and one unicorn
- With two unicorns and no knights
- With hybrid knight-unicorns that move as a knight two-dimensionally (when moving its own level) and as a unicorn when moving three-dimensionally (when changing levels)

=== Game Rules & Endgames ===
Various commentators on 3D chess, including Maack himself and Ralph Betza, have noted that checkmating in 3D chess is more difficult, partly due to the king's increased mobility (26 spaces instead of 8) and the larger size of the play space. Maack himself writes that "it is significantly harder to checkmate a king in 3D space than on a 2D board." Betza writes that this issue would lead to many more draws. A king and a pawn vs a king is always a draw. Betza also argued that even king plus queen would be unlikely to mate a lone king (one cannot force mate).

Because of this, Maack suggested that adding special rules could improve this situation. He recommended various possibilities:

- A Decoration rule: A piece that captures an enemy piece gains that piece's powers.
- A Recruitment rule: Captured pieces are not removed but are immediately added to your own army (changing color).
- Terrain Restriction: A bare king (with no remaining pieces) can be restricted from moving in the third dimension

Other possibilities would include adding new or extra pieces (Betza discusses the "commoner" which moves as a king but is not royal) and allowing for a bare king victory where one is defeated if reduced to a bare king (as in classical shatranj).

== The Kogbetliantz game ==
In 1918, the Russian mathematician Ervand Kogbetliantz also developed a form of 3D chess that used an 8×8×8 gamespace similar to Kubikschach. He increased the total number of chessmen to 64 for each player (128 total), adding even more complexity with new pieces like the fool (moving as Maack's unicorn), the hippogriff and the archbishop (bishop+knight). Kogbetliantz published and promoted his ideas in the United States. Kogbetliantz published a Space Chess pamphlet in 1952, and promoted his game, now under the name Stereo Chess, at the New School for Social Research. While articles appeared in Time and The New Yorker in the 1950s, the game did not attract a wide following. This is likely because Stereo chess was too complex for most people to learn and enjoy as a game.

According to David Pritchard, large scale formats similar to Kubikschach and Stereo chess are "the most popular 3‑D board amongst inventors, and at the same time the most mentally indigestible for the players."

== V.R. Parton's games ==
The chess variant designer V.R. Parton (1897–1974) designed various 3D chess variants. He outlined several of these in his booklet Chessical Cubism or Chess in Space. They include the following:

- Alice chess – using two adjacent 8×8 boards; pieces move "through the looking glass" in between the boards (Note: "Alice Chess, a well-considered variant, may also be classified as a 3‑D game." "In a sense, it is a three-dimensional game, since the board can be thought of as measuring 8×8×2 (in squares).")
- Cubic chess – a 6×6×6 variant with added Maack unicorns; pawns can move and capture one cell forward, either orthogonally, diagonally, or triagonally
- Tamerlane Cubic Chess – adapting Tamerlane chess to a 3D board
- Sphinx Chess – using a unique "four dimensional" playing field consisting of nine 4×4 grids arranged in a 3×3 pattern
- Ecila Chess – named for "Alice" spelled backward, uses several cubic boards in various arrays; Parton called this game "six dimensional" chess

Parton also introduced several new 3D chess pieces. One of these was the narwhal, which can move as either the nook or the Maack unicorn. Others include the wyvern and the hippogriff.

== Star Trek Tri-Dimensional Chess ==
3D chess on Star Trek (from the episode "Court Martial", aired 1967)

Tri-Dimensional Chess, Tri-D Chess, or Three-Dimensional Chess (Note: There is some discussion whether this game should be called "Tri-Dimensional Chess" as in the Star Trek Star Fleet Technical Manual or "Three-Dimensional Chess" as in The Star Trek Encyclopedia and as on Memory Alpha.) is a chess variant which can be seen in many Star Trek TV episodes and movies, starting with the original series (TOS) and proceeding in updated forms throughout the subsequent movies and spinoff series. This depiction of a 3D chess, played by the heroes of the show, fueled the imagination of a generation of game designers and led to increasing interest in 3D chess.

The original Star Trek prop was crafted using boards from 3D Checkers and 3D Tic-Tac-Toe sets available in stores at the time (games also seen in TOS episodes) and adding chess pieces from the futuristic-looking Classic chess set designed by Peter Ganine in 1961. The design retained the 64 squares of a traditional chessboard, but distributed them onto separate platforms in a hierarchy of spatial levels, suggesting to audiences how chess adapted to a future predominated by space travel. Rules for the game were never invented within the series – in fact, the boards are sometimes not even aligned consistently from one scene to the next within a single episode.

=== Rules development ===
While the original prop was never created to a real game, Tri-D chess was included in the Star Trek Star Fleet Technical Manual by Franz Joseph, who created starting positions for the pieces and short rules which state:

Each piece moves exactly the same as in conventional chess except that such moves have tridimensional freedom to the extent of available consecutive squares. 16 of the 24 squares are movable in 4 groups of 4 squares each. They may be moved to one adjacent pin position at a time provided they are either vacant or occupied by only one of the player’s pawns and such action constitutes a move in regular turn. An occupied attack board cannot be moved to an invert pin position.

The vagueness of these rules left much to the imagination and this led various fans and enthusiasts to expand on these ideas and develop a playable game. As such, numerous different sets of rules have been developed.

One complete Standard Rules for the game were originally developed in 1976 by Andrew Bartmess (with encouragement from Joseph) and were subsequently expanded by him into a commercially available booklet. A free summary in English of the Standard Rules is contained on Charles Roth's website, including omissions and ambiguities regarding piece moves across the four Tri‑D gameboard 2×2 attack boards.

A complete set of tournament rules for Tri-Dimensional Chess written by Jens Meder is available on his website. Meder's rules are based on FIDE's rules more than Andrew Bartmess' Standard Rules, with some deviations too. A repository of Tournament Rules games can be found on the website of Michael Klein.

=== Board details ===
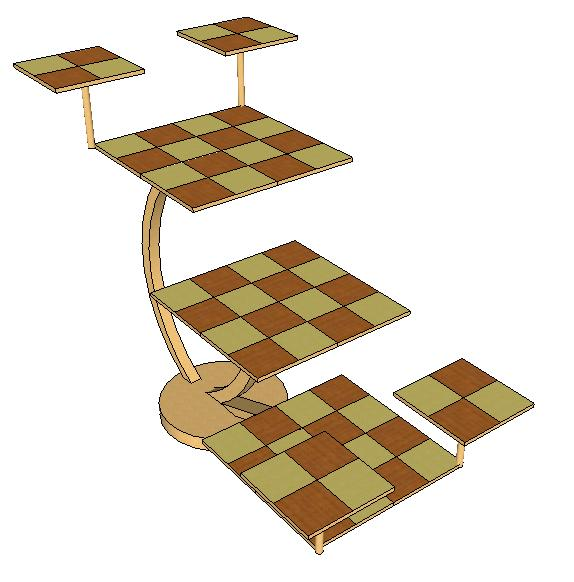
The Tri‑D chessboard

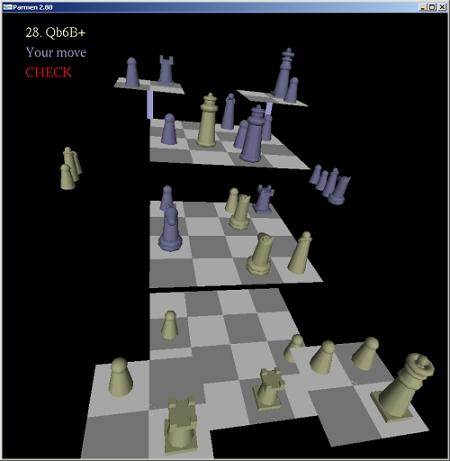
Playing Parmen

Plans for constructing a Tri‑D chessboard can be found on The Chess Variant Pages, as well as in Bartmess' Tri‑D Chess Rules. Details for building a travel-size board are included on Meder's website.

=== Software ===
There is software for playing Tri‑D Chess. Parmen (possibly named after a lead character in the episode "Plato's Stepchildren") is a Windows application written by Doug Keenan and available free on his website. A free Android version of Tri‑D Chess is offered by AwfSoft.

== 8×8×3 variants ==
The appearance of Tri-Dimensional chess in Star Trek led to a "renaissance" in 3D chess in the late 20th century, especially in the United States, as the popular television show fueled the imaginations of game designers for decades afterwards. While the Kogbetliantz Stereo chess variant was known, it was too difficult, and inventors tended to design games focused on smaller play spaces, similar to those seen in Star Trek's prop.

Apart from attempts to design variants based on Star Trek's Tri-D, numerous other 3D chess games were developed in the latter half of the 20th century. The 8×8×3 3D chess field was the most popular playing field among commercial 3D chess variants published during this time. Since the 1960s, there have been many versions of 3D chess that use this layout which consists of three 8×8 standard chessboards stacked on top of each other.

One of the first such variants was designed by Wally Hageman in the early 1960s. The pieces used were those of a regular FIDE chess army, with the movements of Raumschach, except the bishop, which moved as Kogbetliantz’ Archbishop.

Another early design was chess played on an 8×8×3 board designed by NASA engineer Lynn R. Johnson in 1966. The game proved popular with friends and acquaintances and Johnson made several boards for them. Eventually, Johnson secured copyright and published the first commercial 3D chess game. Now known as The Original 3D Chess, it was published in 1968 by Dimensional Games, Inc as 3-D Chess Game. The game was popular enough to be featured in US media.

Other similar commercial games using the 8×8×3 board followed, capitalizing on the new craze. They include Space chess (1970) by the Pacific Game Company (with rules developed by US chess champion Larry Evans), Strato Chess (1973) by John Hansen Hageman's arrangement Company, Chess Cubed by Classic Games Company and "Chess in the Third Dimension" by Skor Mor.

In 1972, game designer and Games magazine editor R. Wayne Schmittberger (1949–2024) proposed another 3D chess variant on a 8×8×3 space after being dissatisfied with the rule sets of most commercial 3D chess variants. He introduced "hook-moves" for rook, bishop and queen inspired by some of the large shogi variants, along with extended 2D move for the knights. Another Schmittberger variant using the same play space is Parallel worlds chess. The main difference in this variant is that it employs two armies per player.

In 2001, William L. D'Agostino developed another set of rules for 3D chess using a 8×8×3 play space. The rules for Millennium 3D chess are intended to keep the game as close as possible to classic FIDE chess while extending it to a 3D space.

== Other 3D chess variants ==
Various other three-dimensional chess variants have been invented, including:

- Total Chess (Charles Beatty, 1945) – which uses four standard 8×8 chessboards stacked.
- Two level chess (Donald L. Miller, 1948) – which uses two 8×8 boards stacked.
- Tedco Three-Dimensional Chess – a 4×4×4 playing field variant designed by Texas Educational Devices Co (established by Texas Instruments) in 1966.
- 3 Dimensional Chess (1979) – a commercial variant published by Enjoyable Hour Products which uses a 4×4×4 playing field.
- 3D XYZ chess (also called Exchequer) – another variant on the 4×4×4 playing field, designed by Rick Hewson.
- Flying chess – two adjacent 8×8 boards
- Isometric Chess – a game by Isometric Chess International (John Oden, 1977) which uses a field in a pyramid shape, with four tiers that begins with a 8×8 base and has a 2×2 center
- Aztec Chess (Roberto Salvadori, 1982) – the field is pyramidal, with an 8×8 base, and three more boards above (6×6, 4×4, 2×2 respectively).
- Hyperchess (1993) – uses a unique helical-like board with 8 levels of different sized boards, designed by Max Chappell
- Space Hexchess (1985, revised 1992) by John Stratford, uses three boards with 91 hexagonal cells.
- 3D Shogi – a 3D version of shogi by Larry L. Smith on a 9×9×3 board space
- 3D Xiang Qi – a 3D version of xiangqi by Larry L. Smith which uses a 5×4 space
- Space shogi – a large 9×9×9 shogi variant.
- Dragonchess – three stacked 8×12 boards, a fantasy variant by Gary Gygax
- Betza's Flying Circus – a chess variant by Ralph Betza in which the standard FIDE army plays on one level, while in the above three boards two types of aerial pieces move—bombers and interceptors; Ralph Betza also had numerous other ideas for 3D chess variants

== In fiction ==
As well as in Star Trek, multi-dimensional chess games are featured in various fictional works, usually in a futuristic or science fiction setting. Isaac Asimov's works include one of the earliest mentions of the game in fiction. His short-story A Perfect Fit describes a 3D chess game consisting of eight boards stacked on top of each other. Other examples include Asimov's Pebble in the Sky, Tristana (1970) by Luis Buñuel, Legend of the Galactic Heroes, Nova, Blake's 7, UFO, Starman Jones, Unreal 2, the Legion of Super-Heroes franchise, Doctor Who, The Big Bang Theory and The Lego Movie. The concept is parodied in Futurama as "tridimensional Scrabble".

== See also ==
- 5D Chess with Multiverse Time Travel

== Primary sources ==
- Dawnson, T.R. (1947) Caissa's Fairy Tales, Stroud News Publishing Co.
- Dawnson, T.R. "Space Chess" (article), in Fabel, Karl; Kemp, C.E. Chess Unlimited
- Maack, F. (1908) Anleitung zum Raumschach: Dreidimensionales Schachspiel
- Maack, F. (1913) Spielregeln zum Raumschach (Rules of Space Chess)
- Maack, F. (1919) Raumschach: Einführung in die Spielpraxis (Space chess: Introduction to the Game's Praxis)

== Bibliography ==
- Dickins, Anthony (1971) [1969]. A Guide to Fairy Chess. New York: Dover Publications Inc. ISBN 0-486-22687-5. (corrected repub. of
  A Guide to Fairy Chess (2nd ed.). Richmond, UK: The Q Press. 1969.)
- Okuda, Denise; Okuda, Michael; Mirek, Debbie (1997). The Star Trek Encyclopedia. Pocket Books. ISBN 0-671-53607-9.
- Pritchard, D.B. (1994). The Encyclopedia of Chess Variants. Games & Puzzles Publications. ISBN 0-9524142-0-1.
- Pritchard, D.B. (2007). Beasley, John (ed.). The Classified Encyclopedia of Chess Variants (2nd ed) (PDF). John Beasley. ISBN 978-0-9555168-0-1.
- Schmittberger, R. Wayne (1992). "3D Chess Sets". New Rules for Classic Games. John Wiley & Sons Inc. pp. 103–07. ISBN 978-0471536215.
- Schnaubelt, Franz Joseph (1975). Star Trek Star Fleet Technical Manual. Ballantine Books. ISBN 0-345-34074-4.
