= Maack =

Maack may refer to:

- Ferdinand Maack (1861–1930), inventor of Raumschach
- Herb Maack (1917–2007), American football coach
- Mary Niles Maack (1945–2023), American librarian and scholar
- Reinhard Maack (1892–1969), German explorer, geologist and geographer
- Richard Maack (1825–1886), Russian naturalist, geographer, and anthropologist
- Sebastian Maack (born 1969), German politician
