= List of Star Trek technical manuals =

Star Trek Technical Manuals are a number of both official and fan-produced works detailing the technology of the fictional Star Trek universe; most pertain to starship design, though others target equipment used in the various Star Trek television series and films.

Franz Joseph Schnaubelt published the original Star Fleet Technical Manual in 1975; since then other manuals have been created by fans and professional artists alike to chronicle the increasing variety of both canon and noncanon vessels and gear. Trek fan Shane Johnson created the official Pocket Books works Mr. Scott's Guide to the Enterprise and Worlds of the Federation after making his own self-produced blueprints.

Two manual creators moved from making blueprints to helping shape the look of the shows themselves. Rick Sternbach became an official illustrator for the franchise's first theatrical release, and later worked for the series Next Generation, Deep Space Nine and Voyager; he went on to contribute to the Next Generation and Deep Space Nine technical manuals from Pocket Books. Geoffery Mandel, who helped create Pocket Books's interstellar reference work Star Trek: Star Charts, worked as scenic artist on the Voyager and Enterprise series as well as the film Star Trek: Insurrection.

For details on out-of-universe reference books see List of Star Trek reference books. The following list is incomplete.

== Star Trek Technical Manuals ==
Item	Creator	Date	Construction	Pages	Size
Star Trek The Motion Picture: 14 Official Blueprints	Andrew G. Probert	1980	(Loose Sheets)	14	19" x 13"
Star Trek: Starship Spotter	Adam "Mojo" Lebowitz & Robert Bonchune	2001	(Perfect Bound)	128	7.4" x 9.1"
Star Fleet Technical Supplements Booklet No. 1	Andres Castineiras	1977	(Staple)	5	8.5" x 11"
Federation Reference Series Volume 1	Aridas Sofia (Editor)	1985	(Loose Sheets)	30	8.5" x 11"
Federation Reference Series Volume 2	Aridas Sofia (Editor)	1985	(Loose Sheets)	32	8.5" x 11"
Federation Reference Series Volume 3	Aridas Sofia (Editor)	1986	(Loose Sheets)	30	8.5" x 11"
Federation Reference Series Volume 4	Aridas Sofia (Editor)	1986	(Loose Sheets)	28	8.5" x 11"
Federation Reference Series Volume 5	Aridas Sofia (Editor)	1987	(Loose Sheets)	28	8.5" x 11"
Federation Reference Series Volume 6	Aridas Sofia (Editor)	1987	(Loose Sheets)	32	8.5" x 11"
Star Ship Registry Program Instruction Manual	Bernard Guignard		(Loose Sheets-Mag Sleeve)	15	8.5" x 11"
Reischl's Guide to Ships of the Fleet	Bernard Reischl	1989	(Staple)	20	8.5" x 11"
Ships of the Star Fleet - Volume Five: Star Fleet Facilities	Chris Wallace	2005	.pdf	60	8.5" x 13"
Ships of the Star Fleet - Volume Four: Star Fleet Operating Forces	Chris Wallace	2005	.pdf	47	8.5" x 13"
Ships of the Star Fleet - Volume One: Cruiser	Chris Wallace	2005	.pdf	116	8.5" x 13"
Ships of the Star Fleet - Volume Three: Scouts and Escorts	Chris Wallace	2005	.pdf	59	8.5" x 13"
Ships of the Star Fleet - Volume Two: Patrol Combatants	Chris Wallace	2005	.pdf	85	8.5" x 13"
Starship Datafile - Volume Two: 2323-2423	Chris Wallace	2003	.pdf	20	8.5" x 11"
Starship Recognition Guide - Volume One: 2223-2325	Chris Wallace	2001	.pdf	25	8.5" x 11"
Starship Recognition Guide - Volume Two: 2325-2423	Chris Wallace	2003	.pdf	20	8.5" x 11"
The Best of Dockyard Review - Volume One: 2290-2350	Chris Wallace	2005	.pdf	45	8.5" x 13"
The Best of Dockyard Review - Volume Two: 2350-2390	Chris Wallace	2003	.pdf	47	8.5" x 13"
The NX Class Cruiser - An Introductory Guide	Chris Wallace	2002	.pdf	19	9" x 12"
The Ships of the Fifth Fleet	Chris Wallace	2000	.pdf	41	9" x 12"
Dockyard Review - The Journal of the Advanced Starship Design Bureau Volume 2 - Issue 1	Chris Wallace, Belldandy Morisato, Alex Rosenzweig, J. Scott Spadaro, Miyuki Kobayakawa	2001	.pdf	12	8.5" x 11"
Dockyard Review - The Journal of the Advanced Starship Design Bureau Volume 4 - Issue 2	Chris Wallace, Belldandy Morisato, Alex Rosenzweig, J. Scott Spadaro, Miyuki Kobayakawa	1999	.pdf	13	8.5" x 11"
Dockyard Review - The Journal of the Advanced Starship Design Bureau Volume 4 - Issue 3	Chris Wallace, Belldandy Morisato, Alex Rosenzweig, J. Scott Spadaro, Miyuki Kobayakawa	1999	.pdf	19	8.5" x 11"
Dockyard Review - The Journal of the Advanced Starship Design Bureau Volume 4 - Issue 4	Chris Wallace, Belldandy Morisato, Alex Rosenzweig, J. Scott Spadaro, Miyuki Kobayakawa	1999	.pdf	16	8.5" x 11"
Dockyard Review - The Journal of the Advanced Starship Design Bureau Volume 4 - Issue 5	Chris Wallace, Belldandy Morisato, Alex Rosenzweig, J. Scott Spadaro, Miyuki Kobayakawa	1999	.pdf	18	8.5" x 11"
Dockyard Review - The Journal of the Advanced Starship Design Bureau Volume 4 - Issue 6	Chris Wallace, Belldandy Morisato, Alex Rosenzweig, J. Scott Spadaro, Miyuki Kobayakawa	1999	.pdf	14	8.5" x 11"
Dockyard Review - The Journal of the Advanced Starship Design Bureau Volume 4 - Issue 7	Chris Wallace, Belldandy Morisato, Alex Rosenzweig, J. Scott Spadaro, Miyuki Kobayakawa	1999	.pdf	13	8.5" x 11"
Dockyard Review - The Journal of the Advanced Starship Design Bureau Volume 4 - Issue 8	Chris Wallace, Belldandy Morisato, Alex Rosenzweig, J. Scott Spadaro, Miyuki Kobayakawa	1999	.pdf	16	8.5" x 11"
Dockyard Review - The Journal of the Advanced Starship Design Bureau Volume 4 - Issue 9	Chris Wallace, Belldandy Morisato, Alex Rosenzweig, J. Scott Spadaro, Miyuki Kobayakawa	1999	.pdf	12	8.5" x 11"
Dockyard Review - The Journal of the Advanced Starship Design Bureau Volume 4 - Issue 10	Gordon Murray, Belldandy Morisato, Alex Rosenzweig, J. Scott Spadaro, Miyuki Kobayakawa	1999	.pdf	10	8.5" x 11"
Dockyard Review - The Journal of the Advanced Starship Design Bureau Volume 3 - Issue 1	Harvey Postlewaite. Laguna Milano, Estoril Monza, Giles Silverstone	1999	.pdf	8	8.5" x 11"
Dockyard Review - The Journal of the Advanced Starship Design Bureau Volume 3 - Issue 2	Harvey Postlewaite. Laguna Milano, Estoril Monza, Giles Silverstone	1999	.pdf	14	8.5" x 11"
Dockyard Review - The Journal of the Advanced Starship Design Bureau Volume 4 - Issue 1	Harvey Postlewaite. Laguna Milano, Estoril Monza, Giles Silverstone	1999	.pdf	12	8.5" x 11"
Dockyard Review - The Journal of the Advanced Starship Design Bureau Volume 2 - Issue 1	John Barnard, Alan Jenkins, Adelaide Kylami, Interlagos Catalunya	1999	.pdf	13	8.5" x 11"
Dockyard Review - The Journal of the Advanced Starship Design Bureau Volume 2 - Issue 2	John Barnard, Alan Jenkins, Adelaide Kylami, Interlagos Catalunya	1999	.pdf	15	8.5" x 11"
Dockyard Review - The Journal of the Advanced Starship Design Bureau Volume 2 - Issue 3	John Barnard, Alan Jenkins, Adelaide Kylami, Interlagos Catalunya	1999	.pdf	15	8.5" x 11"
The 24th Century Technical Manual - Special Edition #1	Christopher Simmons	1989	(Staple)	64	8.5" x 11"
The 24th Century Technical Manual - Special Edition #2	Christopher Simmons	1989	(Staple)	50	8.5" x 11"
Weapons of Eugenics	Christopher Springer	1989	(Saddle Glue-Folder)	24	8.5" x 11"
Klingon - Covert Operations Manual	David Christiansen	1989	(Perfect Bound)	128	8.5" x 11"
Star Trek - The Starfleet Survival Guide	David Mack	2002	(Perfect Bound)	180	5.5" x 8.5"
Starfleet Academy Training Command: Line Officer Requirements Supplement	David Schmidt	1987	(Perfect Bound)	78	8.5" x 11"
Starfleet Academy Training Command: Line Officer Requirements Volume I	David Schmidt	1988	(Perfect Bound)	136	8.5" x 11"
Starfleet Academy Training Command: Staff Officer Requirements Volume II	David Schmidt	1987	(Perfect Bound)	136	8.5" x 11"
Starfleet Dynamics (First Version)	David Schmidt		(Perfect Bound)	192	8.5" x 11"
Starfleet Dynamics (Second Version)	David Schmidt		(Perfect Bound)	192	8.5" x 11"
Starfleet Officer Requirements Vol.1	David Schmidt	1985	(Saddle Stitch)	38	8.5" x 11"
Starfleet Officer Requirements Vol.2	David Schmidt	1987	(Saddle Stitch)	50	8.5" x 11"
Starfleet Prototype: The Journal of Innovative Design and Ideas	David Schmidt		(Perfect Bound)	92	8.5" x 13"
Warp Factor - Issue Four	Don Corson, Don Falloon	1986	(Staple)	40	8.5" x 11"
Warp Factor - Issue Two	Don Corson, Don Falloon	1976	(Saddle Staple)	40	8.5" x 11"
U.S.S. Cheyenne Operations Manual	Don W. Shanks	1994	(Perfect Bound)	128	8.5" x 11"
Star Fleet Medical Reference Manual	Eileen Palestine (Editor)	1977	(Perfect Bound)	160	8.5" x 11"
Star Trek: The Next Generation - Officer's Manual	Fasa	1988	(Perfect Bound)	144	8.5" x 11"
Star Fleet Technical Manual First Edition	Franz Joseph	1975	(Perfect Bound)	192	8.5" x 11"
Star Fleet Technical Manual First Edition Second Printing	Franz Joseph	1975	(Perfect Bound)	192	8.5" x 11"
Star Trek - Fansom Triumphs	Geoffrey Mandel	1978	(Fold/Staple)	32	8.5" x 11"
The Starfleet Handbook -Aliens of Star Trek	Geoffrey Mandel	1977	(Fold/Staple)	6	8.5" x 11"
The Starfleet Handbook -Volume 10	Geoffrey Mandel	1977	(Staple)	8	8.5" x 11"
The Starfleet Handbook -Volume 11	Geoffrey Mandel	1977	(Staple)	8	8.5" x 11"
The Starfleet Handbook -Volume 12	Geoffrey Mandel	1978	(Fold/Staple)	12	8.5" x 11"
The Starfleet Handbook -Volume 13	Geoffrey Mandel	1978	(Fold/Staple)	13	8.5" x 11"
U.S.S. Enterprise Officer's Manual	Geoffrey Mandel	1980	(Spiral Bound)	124	8.5" x 11"
U.S.S. Enterprise Officer's Manual - Revised Edition	Geoffrey Mandel		(Perfect Bound)	124	8.5" x 11"
From the Files of Star Fleet Command	Heihachiro Nogura	1980	(Spiral Bound)	37	8.5" x 11"
Jackill's Guide to Light Attack Craft Volume I	Jackill (Eric Kristiansen)	1991	(Perfect Bound)	106	8.5" x 11"
Jackill's Star Fleet Reference Manual: Ships of the Fleet Volume I	Jackill (Eric Kristiansen)	1992	(Perfect Bound)	128	8.5" x 11"
Jackill's Star Fleet Reference Manual: Ships of the Fleet Volume I - A-ERA	Jackill (Eric Kristiansen)	2006	(Perfect Bound)	160	8.5" x 11"
Jackill's Star Fleet Reference Manual: Ships of the Fleet Volume II	Jackill (Eric Kristiansen)	1993	(Perfect Bound)	128	8.5" x 11"
Jackill's Star Fleet Reference Manual: Ships of the Fleet Volume III	Jackill (Eric Kristiansen)	1995	(Perfect Bound)	128	8.5" x 11"
24th Century - Ships of the Line - Volume Four (Romulan)	James T. Wappel		(Loose Sheets)	44	8.5" x 11"
24th Century - Ships of the Line - Volume One (Federation)	James T. Wappel		(Loose Sheets)	58	8.5" x 11"
24th Century - Ships of the Line - Volume Three (Klingon)	James T. Wappel		(Loose Sheets)	44	8.5" x 11"
24th Century - Ships of the Line - Volume Two (Cardassian)	James T. Wappel		(Loose Sheets)	44	8.5" x 11"
Starfleet Academy Training Manual (2nd Edition)	John Wetsch	Unknown	(Staple)	11	8.5" x 11"
USS Khai Tam Technical Orientation Manual	Kevin McNulty with Colin Toenjes	1994	(Perfect Bound)	92	8.5" x 11"
Historical Spacecraft of the Federation	Kumari Miyazaki	2002	.pdf	60	9" x 12"
Federation Technological Survey - 2150 to 2370	Lawrence Miller		(Perfect Bound)	142	8.5" x 11"
Star Fleet - Ships of the Star Fleet Technical Manual	Neale Davidson	2003	.pdf	36	8.5" x 11"
Star Fleet - Starship Recognition Manual - Ships of the Baton Rouge Era	Neale Davidson	2005	.pdf	36	8.5" x 11"
Star Fleet - Starship Recognition Manual - Volume One - Ships of Support 2268	Neale Davidson	2005	.pdf	36	8.5" x 11"
Star Fleet - Starship Recognition Manual - Volume One - Ships of the Line 2268	Neale Davidson	2005	.pdf	36	8.5" x 11"
Star Fleet - Starship Weaponry Guide 2268	Neale Davidson	2005	.pdf	16	8.5" x 11"
Starfleet - Ships of the Constitution-Class Era - Volume One	Neale Davidson	2005	.pdf	40	8.5" x 11"
Star Trek - Crew Member's Exploration Pack	No Illustrator Listed	1994	(Saddle Staple)	24	6" x 8"
Starfleet - Training Command/Starfleet Academy - Ship Recognition	No Illustrator Listed		(Spiral Bound)	43	8.5" x 11"
Starfleet Hand Weapon Familiarization Handbook	No Illustrator Listed		(Spiral Bound)	29	8.5" x 11"
Starfleet Technical Manual - Training Command/Starfleet Academy	No Illustrator Listed		(Spiral Bound)	28	8.5" x 11"
Vulcan Harp Construction Plans - Vulcan Music Academy	Perry Wright		(Loose Sheets-Folder)	12	24" x 48"
Federation Spaceflight Chronology - 1	Richard E. Mandel	2006	.pdf	48	8.5" x 11"
Federation Spaceflight Chronology - 2	Richard E. Mandel	2007	.pdf	40	8.5" x 11"
Federation Spaceflight Chronology - 3	Richard E. Mandel	2007	.pdf	39	8.5" x 11"
Federation Spaceflight Chronology - 4	Richard E. Mandel	2007	.pdf	35	8.5" x 11"
Federation Spaceflight Chronology - 5	Richard E. Mandel	2007	.pdf	39	8.5" x 11"
Federation Spaceflight Chronology - 6	Richard E. Mandel	2007	.pdf		8.5" x 11"
Federation Spaceflight Chronology - 7	Richard E. Mandel	2007	.pdf	40	8.5" x 11"
Federation Spaceflight Chronology - 8	Richard E. Mandel	2007	.pdf	38	8.5" x 11"
Federation Spaceflight Chronology - 9	Richard E. Mandel	2007	.pdf	41	8.5" x 11"
Federation Spaceflight Chronology - A (The Klingon Empire)	Richard E. Mandel	2007	.pdf	50	8.5" x 11"
Intrepid Class Starship - Blueprints and Technical Guide	Rick Sternbach		(Loose Sheets-Mag Sleeve)	20	8.5" x 11"
USS Enterprise NCC-1701 - Constitution Class Refit - Familiarization Manual	Rick Sternbach	1978	(Braid)		11" x 17"
Star Trek: The Next Generation Technical Manual	Rick Sternbach and Michael Okuda	1991	(Perfect Bound)	99	8.5" x 11"
Star Trek: Deep Space Nine Technical Manual	Rick Sternbach, Herman Zimmerman, Doug Drexler	1998	(Perfect Bound)	180	8.5" x 11"
Star Fleet Data File - Volume 1	Robert J Dee	1991	(Staple)	72	8.5" x 11"
History of the Vessel Enterprise - From the 16th to the 24th Century	Ronald M. Roden Jr.	1992	(Perfect Bound)	128	8.5" x 11"
Spacecraft of Earth - Volume One: 1957-2063	Scott A. Akers	2002	.pdf	48	8.5" x 13"
Mr. Scott's Guide to the Enterprise	Shane Johnson	1987	(Perfect Bound)	128	8.5" x 11"
Star Fleet Uniform Recognition Manual	Shane Johnson	1985	(Saddle Staple)	80	8.5" x 11"
Star Trek - The Worlds of the Federation	Shane Johnson	1989	(Perfect Bound)	156	8.5" x 11"
Star Trek - The Next Generation - Technical Journal	Shane Johnson	1987	(Perfect Bound)	82	8.5" x 11"
Weapons and Field Equipment Technical Manual	Shane Johnson	1984	(Saddle Staple)	80	8.5" x 11"
Star Trek Spaceflight Chronology 1980-2188	Stan and Fred Goldstein. Illustrated by Rick Sternbach	1980	(Perfect Bound)	192	8.5" x 11"
Ships of the Star Fleet - Akyazi - Class Perimeter Action Ships	Todd Guenther	1992	(Perfect Bound)	92	9" x 12"
Ships of the Star Fleet - Volume One	Todd Guenther	1988	(Perfect Bound)	92	9" x 12"
Ships of the Star Fleet: Akyazi-Class Perimeter Action Ships	Todd Guenther	1992	(Perfect Bound)	92	9" x 12"
Starship Design - Interstellar Forum for Naval Power	Todd Guenther, Michael Morrissette	1984	(Saddle Staple)	21	8.5" x 11"
Jaynz - Ships of Star Fleet - 01	Neale Davidson	2007	.pdf	36	8.5" x 11"
Jaynz - Ships of Star Fleet - 02	Neale Davidson	2007	.pdf	36	8.5" x 11"
Jaynz - Ships of Star Fleet - 03	Neale Davidson	2007	.pdf	36	8.5" x 11"
Jaynz - Ships of Star Fleet - 04	Neale Davidson	2007	.pdf	36	8.5" x 11"
Jaynz - Ships of Star Fleet - 05	Neale Davidson	2007	.pdf	36	8.5" x 11"
Technical File: Star Trek Devices	John Peel	1988			

== Reference material by year and title ==
=== 1970s ===
- 1975. Franz Joseph (Schnaubelt). Star Fleet Technical Manual First Edition. Ballantine.
- 1975. Franz Joseph (Schnaubelt). Star Fleet Technical Manual First Edition, 2nd printing. Ballantine.
- 1977. Geoffrey Mandel. The Starfleet Handbook, Vol 10. No publisher listed.
- 1977. Geoffrey Mandel. The Starfleet Handbook, Vol 11. No publisher listed.
- 1977. Geoffrey Mandel. The Starfleet Handbook—Aliens of Star Trek. No publisher listed.
- 1977. Eileen Palestine, ed. Star Fleet Medical Reference Manual. Ballantine Books.
- 1977. Andres Castineiras. Star Fleet Technical Supplements Booklet no 1. No publisher listed.
- 1978. Rick Sternbach. USS Enterprise NCC-1701—Constitution Class Refit—Familiarization Manual. No publisher listed.
- 1978. Geoffrey Mandel. The Starfleet Handbook, Vol 12. No publisher listed.
- 1978. Geoffrey Mandel. The Starfleet Handbook, Vol 13. No publisher listed.

=== 1980s ===
- 1980. Heihachiro Nogura. From the Files of Star Fleet Command. Star Fleet Historical Archives.
- 1980. Stan and Fred Goldstein, illustrated by Rick Sternbach. Star Trek Spaceflight Chronology 1980-2188. Wallaby Books.
- 1980. Andrew G. Probert, rendered by David Kimble Star Trek The Motion Picture: 14 Official Blueprints. Wallaby Books.
- 1984. Shane Johnson. Weapons and Field Equipment Technical Manual. Noron Group.
- 1984. Todd Guenther and Michael Morrissette. Starship Design—Interstellar Forum for Naval Power. No publisher listed.
- 1985. Aridas Sofia, ed. Federation Reference Series, Vol 1. Star Fleet Printing Office.
- 1985. Aridas Sofia, ed. Federation Reference Series, Vol 2. Star Fleet Printing Office.
- 1985. Shane Johnson. Star Fleet Uniform Recognition Manual. Noron Group.
- 1985. David Schmidt. Starfleet Officer Requirements Vol.1. Self-published.
- 1986. Aridas Sofia, ed. Federation Reference Series, Vol 3. Star Fleet Printing Office.
- 1986. Aridas Sofia, ed. Federation Reference Series, Vol 4. Star Fleet Printing Office.
- 1987. Aridas Sofia, ed. Federation Reference Series, Vol 5. Star Fleet Printing Office.
- 1987. Aridas Sofia, ed. Federation Reference Series, Vol 6. Star Fleet Printing Office.
- 1987. Shane Johnson. Mr. Scott's Guide to the Enterprise. Pocket Books.
- 1987. Shane Johnson. Star Trek—The Next Generation—Technical Journal. No publisher listed.
- 1987. David Schmidt. Starfleet Academy Training Command: Line Officer Requirements Supplement. Self-published.
- 1987. David Schmidt. Starfleet Academy Training Command: Staff Officer Requirements, Vol II. Self-published.
- 1987. David Schmidt. Starfleet Officer Requirements, Vol 2. Self-published.
- 1988. Todd Guenther. Ships of the Star Fleet, Vol One. Mastercom.
- 1988. Fasa. Star Trek: The Next Generation—Officer's Manual. FASA Corporation.
- 1988. John Peel. Technical File: Star Trek Devices. Pop Cult Int.
- 1988. David Schmidt. Starfleet Academy Training Command: Line Officer Requirements, Vol I. Self-published.
- 1989. David Christiansen. Klingon—Covert Operations Manual. Self-published.
- 1989. Bernard Reischl. Reischl's Guide to Ships of the Fleet. Self-published.
- 1989. Shane Johnson. Star Trek—The Worlds of the Federation. Pocket Books.
- 1989. Christopher Simmons. The 24th Century Technical Manual Special Edition 1989, 1. No publisher listed.
- 1989. Christopher Simmons. The 24th Century Technical Manual Special Edition 1989, 2. No publisher listed.
- 1989. Christopher Springer. Weapons of Eugenics. No publisher listed.

=== 1990s ===
- 1991. Kristiansen, Eric. Jackill's Guide to Light Attack Craft, Vol I. Jackill's.
- 1991. Robert J Dee. Star Fleet Data File, Vol 1. No publisher listed.
- 1991. Rick Sternbach and Michael Okuda. Star Trek: The Next Generation Technical Manual. Pocket Books.
- 1992. Todd Guenther. Ships of the Star Fleet: Akyazi-class perimeter action ships. Mastercom.
- 1992. Ronald M Roden Jr. History of the vessel Enterprise from the 16th to the 24th Century. Intergalactic Trading Co.
- 1992. Kristiansen, Eric. Jackill's Star Fleet Reference Manual: Ships of the Fleet, Vol I. Self-published.
- 1993. Kristiansen, Eric. Jackill's Star Fleet Reference Manual: Ships of the Fleet, Vol II. Self-published.
- 1994. W Paul Hollingsworth. Galileo-Class Starcruiser: Ship's Organization and Regulations Manual. Parsec Publications.
- 1994. Don W Shanks. USS Cheyenne Operations Manual. Nightmare Distribution.
- 1994. Kevin McNulty with Colin Toenjes. USS Khai Tam Technical Orientation Manual. Intergalactic Press.
- 1995. Jackill (Eric Kristiansen). Jackill's Star Fleet Reference Manual: Ships of the Fleet, Vol III. Self-published.
- 1998. Rick Sternbach, Herman Zimmerman, Doug Drexler. Star Trek: Deep Space Nine—Technical Manual. Pocket Books.
- 1999. John Barnard. Dockyard Review, the Journal of the Advanced Starship Design Bureau, Vol 2 Issue 1. Panda Productions.
- 1999. John Barnard. Dockyard Review, the Journal of the Advanced Starship Design Bureau, Vol 2 Issue 2. Panda Productions.
- 1999. John Barnard. Dockyard Review, the Journal of the Advanced Starship Design Bureau, Vol 2 Issue 3. Panda Productions.
- 1999. Harvey Postlewaite. Dockyard Review, the Journal of the Advanced Starship Design Bureau, Vol 3 Issue 1. Panda Productions.
- 1999. Harvey Postlewaite. Dockyard Review, the Journal of the Advanced Starship Design Bureau, Vol 3 Issue 2. Panda Productions.
- 1999. Harvey Postlewaite. Dockyard Review, the Journal of the Advanced Starship Design Bureau, Vol 4 Issue 1. Panda Productions.
- 1999. Chris Wallace. Dockyard Review, the Journal of the Advanced Starship Design Bureau, Vol 4 Issue 2. Panda Productions.
- 1999. Chris Wallace. Dockyard Review, the Journal of the Advanced Starship Design Bureau, Vol 4 Issue 3. Panda Productions.
- 1999. Chris Wallace. Dockyard Review, the Journal of the Advanced Starship Design Bureau, Vol 4 Issue 4. Panda Productions.
- 1999. Chris Wallace. Dockyard Review, the Journal of the Advanced Starship Design Bureau, Vol 4 Issue 5. Panda Productions.
- 1999. Chris Wallace. Dockyard Review, the Journal of the Advanced Starship Design Bureau, Vol 4 Issue 6. Panda Productions.
- 1999. Chris Wallace. Dockyard Review, the Journal of the Advanced Starship Design Bureau, Vol 4 Issue 7. Panda Productions.
- 1999. Chris Wallace. Dockyard Review, the Journal of the Advanced Starship Design Bureau, Vol 4 Issue 8. Panda Productions.
- 1999. Chris Wallace. Dockyard Review, the Journal of the Advanced Starship Design Bureau, Vol 4 Issue 9. Panda Productions.
- 1999. Gordon Murraya. Dockyard Review, the Journal of the Advanced Starship Design Bureau, Vol 4 Issue 10. Panda Productions.

=== 2000s ===
- 2000. Chris Wallace. The Ships of the Fifth Fleet. Panda Productions.
- 2001. Chris Wallace. Dockyard Review, the Journal of the Advanced Starship Design Bureau, Vol 2 Issue 1. Panda Productions.
- 2001. Adam 'Mojo' Lebowitz and Robert Bonchune. Star Trek: Starship Spotter. Pocket Books.
- 2001. Chris Wallace. Starship Recognition Guide, Vol One: 2223-2325. Panda Productions.
- 2002. Kumari Miyazaki. Historical Spacecraft of the Federation. Panda Productions.
- 2002. Chris Wallace. The NX Class Cruiser—An Introductory Guide. Panda Productions.
- 2002. Scott A Akers. Spacecraft of Earth, Volume one, 1957-2063. Jaxon Information Institute and Panda Productions.
- 2003. Chris Wallace. The Best of Dockyard Review, Vol Two: 2350-2390. Panda Productions.
- 2003. Neale Davidson. Star Fleet—Ships of the Star Fleet Technical Manual. No publisher listed.
- 2003. Chris Wallace. Starship Datafile, Vol Two: 2323-2423. Panda Productions.
- 2003. Chris Wallace. Starship Recognition Guide, Vol Two: 2325-2423. Panda Productions.
- 2005. Chris Wallace. The Best of Dockyard Review, Vol One: 2290-2350. Panda Productions.
- 2005. Chris Wallace. Ships of the Star Fleet, Vol One: Cruiser. Panda Productions.
- 2005. Chris Wallace. Ships of the Star Fleet, Vol Two: Patrol Combatants. Panda Productions.
- 2005. Chris Wallace. Ships of the Star Fleet, Vol Three: Scouts and Escorts. Panda Productions.
- 2005. Chris Wallace. Ships of the Star Fleet, Vol Four: Star Fleet Operating Forces. Panda Productions.
- 2005. Chris Wallace. Ships of the Star Fleet, Vol Five: Star Fleet Facilities. Panda Productions.
- 2005. Neale Davidson. Star Fleet Starship Recognition Manual—Ships of the Baton Rouge Era. No publisher listed.
- 2005. Neale Davidson. Star Fleet Starship Recognition Manual, Vol One—Ships of the Line 2268. No publisher listed.
- 2005. Neale Davidson. Star Fleet Starship Recognition Manual, Vol One—Ships of Support 2268. No publisher listed.
- 2005. Neale Davidson. Star Fleet Starship Weaponry Guide 2268. No publisher listed.
- 2005. Neale Davidson. Starfleet Ships of the Constitution-class era, vol one. No publisher listed.
- 2006. Richard E Mandel. Federation spaceflight chronology 1. No publisher listed.
- 2006. Kristiansen, Eric. Jackill's Star Fleet Reference Manual: Ships of the Fleet, Vol I—A-ERA. No publisher listed.
- 2007. Richard E Mandel. Federation Spaceflight Chronology A (The Klingon Empire). No publisher listed.
- 2007. Richard E Mandel. Federation spaceflight chronology 2. No publisher listed.
- 2007. Richard E Mandel. Federation Spaceflight Chronology 3. No publisher listed.
- 2007. Richard E Mandel. Federation Spaceflight Chronology 4. No publisher listed.
- 2007. Richard E Mandel. Federation Spaceflight Chronology 5. No publisher listed.
- 2007. Richard E Mandel. Federation Spaceflight Chronology 6. No publisher listed.
- 2007. Richard E Mandel. Federation Spaceflight Chronology 7. No publisher listed.
- 2007. Richard E Mandel. Federation spaceflight chronology 8. No publisher listed.
- 2007. Richard E Mandel. Federation Spaceflight Chronology 9. No publisher listed.
- 2007. Vance. Jaynz Ships of Star Fleet 01. No publisher listed.
- 2007. Vance. Jaynz Ships of Star Fleet 02. No publisher listed.
- 2007. Vance. Jaynz Ships of Star Fleet 03. No publisher listed.
- 2007. Vance. Jaynz Ships of Star Fleet 04. No publisher listed.
- 2007. Vance. Jaynz Ships of Star Fleet 05. No publisher listed.

=== Unknown ===
- Lawrence Miller. Federation Technological Survey—2150 to 2370. No publisher or date listed.
- Rick Sternbach. Intrepid Class Starship—Blueprints and Technical Guide. No publisher or date listed.
- Bernard Guignard. Star Ship Registry Program Instruction Manual. No publisher or date listed.
- John Wetsch. Starfleet Academy Training Manual, 2nd ed. No publisher or date listed.
- David Schmidt. Starfleet Dynamics (First Version). No publisher or date listed.
- David Schmidt. Starfleet Dynamics (Second Version). No publisher or date listed.
- No illustrator listed. Starfleet Hand Weapon Familiarization Handbook. No publisher or date listed.
- David Schmidt. Starfleet Prototype: The Journal of Innovative Design and Ideas. No publisher or date listed.
- No illustrator listed. Starfleet Technical Manual—Training Command/Starfleet Academy. No publisher or date listed.
- No illustrator listed. Starfleet Training Command, Starfleet Academy—Ship Recognition. No publisher or date listed.
- James T Wappel. 24th Century Ships of the Line, Vol Two (Cardassian). No publisher or date listed.
- James T Wappel. 24th Century Ships of the Line, Vol One (Federation). No publisher or date listed.
- Geoffrey Mandel. USS Enterprise Officer's Manual. No publisher or date listed.
- Geoffrey Mandel. USS Enterprise Officer's Manual—Revised Edition. No publisher or date listed.
- James T Wappel. 24th Century Ships of the Line, Vol Three (Klingon). No publisher or date listed.
- James T Wappel. 24th Century Ships of the Line, Vol Four (Romulan). No publisher or date listed.
- Perry Wright. Vulcan Harp Construction Plans—Vulcan Music Academy. No publisher or date listed.
