= Millennium 3D chess =

Three-dimensional chess variant

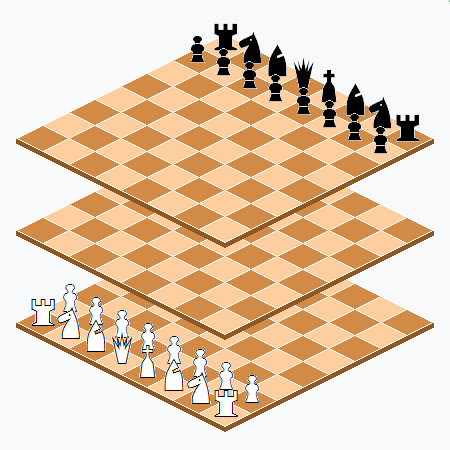
3D rendering of starting position

Millennium 3D chess is a three-dimensional chess variant created by William L. D'Agostino in 2001. It employs three vertically stacked 8×8 boards, with each player controlling a standard set of chess pieces. The inventor describes his objective as "extending the traditional chess game into a multilevel environment without distorting the basic game."

== Rules ==
Millennium 3D chess extends the traditional (two-dimensional) game of chess into a multilevel environment.

For notation purposes, the three board levels are denoted 1, 2 (the middle board), and 3. Moves are recorded in the same manner as chess, using algebraic notation, with the only difference that each square is prefaced by its level number. The white and black armies begin, in standard formation, on boards 1 and 3 respectively.

All pieces can always move as normal while staying on the same board. Additionally, every piece is able to move between boards. Each piece's additional permitted movement in the third dimension is extended from its conventional 2D movement as follows:

- The king can move one square up or down, either directly or combined with its regular movement.
- The knight can move up or down one board and two squares orthogonally, or up or down two boards and one square orthogonally. As in standard chess, the knight is the only piece able to move past intervening pieces.
- The bishop can move up or down one or two boards, as long as it also moves the same number of squares in a diagonal direction.
- The rook can move vertically up and down while not moving in the other two dimensions. Additionally, a rook can move an equal number of squares vertically as it does in one of the lateral dimensions.
- The queen moves as the bishop and rook combined.
- The pawn can move one square up or down while staying in the same position laterally, or it can advance one square and additionally move one board up or down. Optionally, the pawn's first move can be two squares vertically, or two squares forward and two squares vertically.
  The pawn can capture diagonally forwards onto a board immediately above or below it. After a pawn's two-step first move, unless that move was two squares vertically only, the pawn may be captured en passant on the square it passed through.
  Promotion occurs at the opponent's back rank and starting board; i.e. White promotes at rank 8 of board 3, and Black promotes at rank 1 of board 1.

a8	b8	c8	d8	e8	f8	g8	h8
a7	b7	c7	d7	e7	f7	g7	h7
a6	b6	c6	d6	e6	f6	g6	h6
a5	b5	c5	d5	e5	f5	g5	h5
a4	b4	c4	d4	e4	f4	g4	h4
a3	b3	c3	d3	e3	f3	g3	h3
a2	b2	c2	d2	e2	f2	g2	h2
a1	b1	c1	d1	e1	f1	g1	h1

1

a8	b8	c8	d8	e8	f8	g8	h8
a7	b7	c7	d7	e7	f7	g7	h7
a6	b6	c6	d6	e6	f6	g6	h6
a5	b5	c5	d5	e5	f5	g5	h5
a4	b4	c4	d4	e4	f4	g4	h4
a3	b3	c3	d3	e3	f3	g3	h3
a2	b2	c2	d2	e2	f2	g2	h2
a1	b1	c1	d1	e1	f1	g1	h1

2

a8	b8	c8	d8	e8	f8	g8	h8
a7	b7	c7	d7	e7	f7	g7	h7
a6	b6	c6	d6	e6	f6	g6	h6
a5	b5	c5	d5	e5	f5	g5	h5
a4	b4	c4	d4	e4	f4	g4	h4
a3	b3	c3	d3	e3	f3	g3	h3
a2	b2	c2	d2	e2	f2	g2	h2
a1	b1	c1	d1	e1	f1	g1	h1

3

Initial setup

a8	b8	c8	d8	e8	f8	g8	h8
a7	b7	c7	d7	e7	f7	g7	h7
a6	b6	c6	d6	e6	f6	g6	h6
a5	b5	c5	d5	e5	f5	g5	h5
a4	b4	c4	d4	e4	f4	g4	h4
a3	b3	c3	d3	e3	f3	g3	h3
a2	b2	c2	d2	e2	f2	g2	h2
a1	b1	c1	d1	e1	f1	g1	h1

1

a8	b8	c8	d8	e8	f8	g8	h8
a7	b7	c7	d7	e7	f7	g7	h7
a6	b6	c6	d6	e6	f6	g6	h6
a5	b5	c5	d5	e5	f5	g5	h5
a4	b4	c4	d4	e4	f4	g4	h4
a3	b3	c3	d3	e3	f3	g3	h3
a2	b2	c2	d2	e2	f2	g2	h2
a1	b1	c1	d1	e1	f1	g1	h1

2

a8	b8	c8	d8	e8	f8	g8	h8
a7	b7	c7	d7	e7	f7	g7	h7
a6	b6	c6	d6	e6	f6	g6	h6
a5	b5	c5	d5	e5	f5	g5	h5
a4	b4	c4	d4	e4	f4	g4	h4
a3	b3	c3	d3	e3	f3	g3	h3
a2	b2	c2	d2	e2	f2	g2	h2
a1	b1	c1	d1	e1	f1	g1	h1

3

Movement of the rook and knight

a8	b8	c8	d8	e8	f8	g8	h8
a7	b7	c7	d7	e7	f7	g7	h7
a6	b6	c6	d6	e6	f6	g6	h6
a5	b5	c5	d5	e5	f5	g5	h5
a4	b4	c4	d4	e4	f4	g4	h4
a3	b3	c3	d3	e3	f3	g3	h3
a2	b2	c2	d2	e2	f2	g2	h2
a1	b1	c1	d1	e1	f1	g1	h1

1

a8	b8	c8	d8	e8	f8	g8	h8
a7	b7	c7	d7	e7	f7	g7	h7
a6	b6	c6	d6	e6	f6	g6	h6
a5	b5	c5	d5	e5	f5	g5	h5
a4	b4	c4	d4	e4	f4	g4	h4
a3	b3	c3	d3	e3	f3	g3	h3
a2	b2	c2	d2	e2	f2	g2	h2
a1	b1	c1	d1	e1	f1	g1	h1

2

a8	b8	c8	d8	e8	f8	g8	h8
a7	b7	c7	d7	e7	f7	g7	h7
a6	b6	c6	d6	e6	f6	g6	h6
a5	b5	c5	d5	e5	f5	g5	h5
a4	b4	c4	d4	e4	f4	g4	h4
a3	b3	c3	d3	e3	f3	g3	h3
a2	b2	c2	d2	e2	f2	g2	h2
a1	b1	c1	d1	e1	f1	g1	h1

3

Movement of the bishop and queen

a8	b8	c8	d8	e8	f8	g8	h8
a7	b7	c7	d7	e7	f7	g7	h7
a6	b6	c6	d6	e6	f6	g6	h6
a5	b5	c5	d5	e5	f5	g5	h5
a4	b4	c4	d4	e4	f4	g4	h4
a3	b3	c3	d3	e3	f3	g3	h3
a2	b2	c2	d2	e2	f2	g2	h2
a1	b1	c1	d1	e1	f1	g1	h1

1

a8	b8	c8	d8	e8	f8	g8	h8
a7	b7	c7	d7	e7	f7	g7	h7
a6	b6	c6	d6	e6	f6	g6	h6
a5	b5	c5	d5	e5	f5	g5	h5
a4	b4	c4	d4	e4	f4	g4	h4
a3	b3	c3	d3	e3	f3	g3	h3
a2	b2	c2	d2	e2	f2	g2	h2
a1	b1	c1	d1	e1	f1	g1	h1

2

a8	b8	c8	d8	e8	f8	g8	h8
a7	b7	c7	d7	e7	f7	g7	h7
a6	b6	c6	d6	e6	f6	g6	h6
a5	b5	c5	d5	e5	f5	g5	h5
a4	b4	c4	d4	e4	f4	g4	h4
a3	b3	c3	d3	e3	f3	g3	h3
a2	b2	c2	d2	e2	f2	g2	h2
a1	b1	c1	d1	e1	f1	g1	h1

3

Movement of the pawn and king. Squares marked × are capturing moves for the pawns.

== Example game ==
George Davis vs. William D'Agostino, corr. 2006:
1. ♘2g3 ♝2b7 2. ♗3e3 ♞3c6 3. ♘2b3 ♝2g7 4. ♘2a5 ♛1b6 5. ♘3c5 ♛×1b2 6. ♘×3b7 ♛3b4 7. ♘3c5 ♛3e1+ 8. ♕2e1 ♛3c3+ 9. ♔2f1 ♛×1a1 10. ♕2c1 ♝2a6+ 11. 2e2 ♛×1a2 12. ♘2c7 ♜2h7 13. ♘1e7+ ♚2e8 14. ♘1c6 ♜1c8 15. ♘×3c7 ♜×1c2 16. ♕2c7 ♛2b1+ 17. ♔1g1 ♞3e5 18. ♕1d7+ ♚2f8 19. ♗2f4 ♛2d1 20. ♗×3e5 ♛3e1+ 21. ♔2g1 ♛×3e5 22. ♕2e7+ ♚1g7 23. ♕×3d7 ♝2d4+ 24. 2e3 ♜2c1+ 25. ♔1g1 ♛3g3+ 26. 2g2 ♜2f1+ 27. ♘×2f1 ♝3e3+ 28. 2f2 ♛×2f2# 0–1

== See also ==
- Parallel worlds chess
