= Parallel worlds chess =

Three-dimensional chess variant

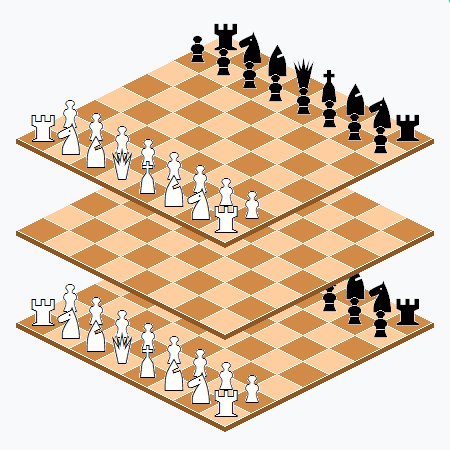
The three "levels" of the board

Parallel worlds chess is a three-dimensional chess variant invented by R. Wayne Schmittberger in the 1980s. The gamespace comprises three 8×8 chessboards at different levels. Each side commands two full chess armies on levels 1 and 3. Level 2 begins empty and obeys its own move rules.

== Game description ==
Each player controls two complete chess armies, initially on levels 1 and 3. White moves first. The first player to capture either enemy king wins the game.

a8	b8	c8	d8	e8	f8	g8	h8
a7	b7	c7	d7	e7	f7	g7	h7
a6	b6	c6	d6	e6	f6	g6	h6
a5	b5	c5	d5	e5	f5	g5	h5
a4	b4	c4	d4	e4	f4	g4	h4
a3	b3	c3	d3	e3	f3	g3	h3
a2	b2	c2	d2	e2	f2	g2	h2
a1	b1	c1	d1	e1	f1	g1	h1

1

a8	b8	c8	d8	e8	f8	g8	h8
a7	b7	c7	d7	e7	f7	g7	h7
a6	b6	c6	d6	e6	f6	g6	h6
a5	b5	c5	d5	e5	f5	g5	h5
a4	b4	c4	d4	e4	f4	g4	h4
a3	b3	c3	d3	e3	f3	g3	h3
a2	b2	c2	d2	e2	f2	g2	h2
a1	b1	c1	d1	e1	f1	g1	h1

2

a8	b8	c8	d8	e8	f8	g8	h8
a7	b7	c7	d7	e7	f7	g7	h7
a6	b6	c6	d6	e6	f6	g6	h6
a5	b5	c5	d5	e5	f5	g5	h5
a4	b4	c4	d4	e4	f4	g4	h4
a3	b3	c3	d3	e3	f3	g3	h3
a2	b2	c2	d2	e2	f2	g2	h2
a1	b1	c1	d1	e1	f1	g1	h1

3

Starting setup. Level 2 obeys its own rules and can be thought of as an interdimensional wormhole.

=== Move rules ===
On each turn, a player may move up to three of their pieces, including pawns. (On the first turn, however, White may move no more than two pieces.) Each piece moved can move only once in the turn. The only stipulation is that none of these moves may end on the same level. (They may begin on the same level, however.)

All pieces except kings can move straight up or down one level to an empty square. (Thus captures are not permitted when moving to a new level.)

On levels 1 and 3, moves, captures, and pawn promotions follow the same rules as in standard chess. On level 2, special rules apply:

- All pieces move as chess queens;
- Captures are not permitted;
- A pawn that moves to the last rank does not promote.

Rules for pawns that move from level 2:

- If a pawn on level 2 moves to the owner's last rank on levels 1 or 3, it immediately promotes.
- If a pawn on level 2 moves to the owner's first rank on levels 1 or 3, on that level it can, on a future turn, move only one step to the second rank. Once on the second rank, it regains its normal two-step option.

== See also ==
- 5D Chess with Multiverse Time Travel
- Double chess – a 2D chess variant with two chess armies per side
- Millennium 3D Chess
- Wildebeest chess – another chess variant by R. Wayne Schmittberger
