= Lora Johnson =

American author

- Born: Shane Johnson; 4 October 1959
- Died: 8 August 2024 (aged 64)
- Occupation: Author
- Writing career
- Period: 1985–2007
- Genres: Christian fiction, Science fiction
- Notable works: Ice, Mr. Scott's Guide to the Enterprise

Lora Johnson was an American author best known for the novel Ice.

Her works included numerous original novels and Star Trek reference books, including Mr. Scott's Guide to the Enterprise, the Star Trek: The Next Generation Technical Journal and Worlds of the Federation. She also authored the Star Wars Technical Journal and contributed to the canon of the Star Wars universe. She was a historian of United States spaceflights and was a design consultant on HBO's From the Earth to the Moon mini-series. More recently, she created the Virtual Alamo interactive online exhibit for the University of Texas at Arlington.

== Personal life ==
=== Gender transition ===
After suffering prolonged and debilitating stress-induced health problems that nearly ended her life, Johnson dropped out of the public eye in 2008 and underwent correction of a congenital intersex condition, transitioning from male to female.

== Awards ==
Her novel Chayatocha received the Best of 2003 in literature award from Christian Fiction Review magazine. Two of her novels, Ice and The Last Guardian, were Christy Award finalists.

== Partial bibliography ==
- Johnson, Shane (March 1985). Blueprinting The Science Fiction Universes. New Media Books.
- Johnson, Shane (July 1, 1987). Mr. Scott's Guide to the Enterprise. Pocket Books. ISBN 978-0-671-63576-3.
- Johnson, Shane (August 1989). The Worlds of the Federation. Pocket Books. ISBN 978-0-671-66989-8.
- Johnson, Shane (June 24, 1996). "Star Wars" Technical Journal. Boxtree Ltd. ISBN 978-0-7522-0391-1.
- Johnson, Shane (February 20, 2001). The Last Guardian. WaterBrook Press. ISBN 978-1-57856-367-8.
- Johnson, Shane (July 16, 2002). Ice. WaterBrook Press. ISBN 978-1-57856-548-1.
- Johnson, Shane (November 1, 2003). Chayatocha. Barbour Publishing. ISBN 978-1-59310-051-3.
- Johnson, Shane (September 21, 2004). A Form of Godliness. WaterBrook Press. ISBN 978-1-57856-549-8.
- Johnson, Shane (May 1, 2007). The Demas Revelation. David C. Cook. ISBN 978-1-58919-090-0.
