= Space shogi =

9x9x9 variant of Japanese chess

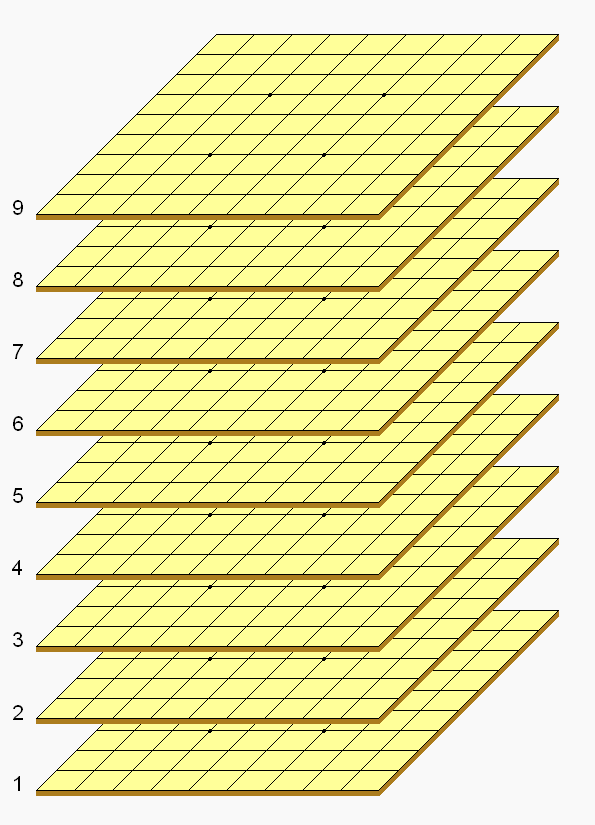
Space Shogi 3D gamespace

Space shogi is a three-dimensional shogi variant invented by George R. Dekle Sr. in 1987. The gamespace comprises nine 9×9 shogi boards stacked vertically. Each player controls a standard set of shogi pieces.

Space shogi was included in World Game Review No. 10 edited by Michael Keller.

== Game rules ==
Space shogi follows standard shogi conventions, including the same types and numbers of pieces, and a similar initial setup. All the normal shogi rules apply, including drops, promotion, check, checkmate, and impasse. Space shogi, however, gives the pieces freedom of three-dimensional movement.

=== Starting setup ===
Black starts the game occupying levels 1 through 3; White starts on levels 9 through 7.

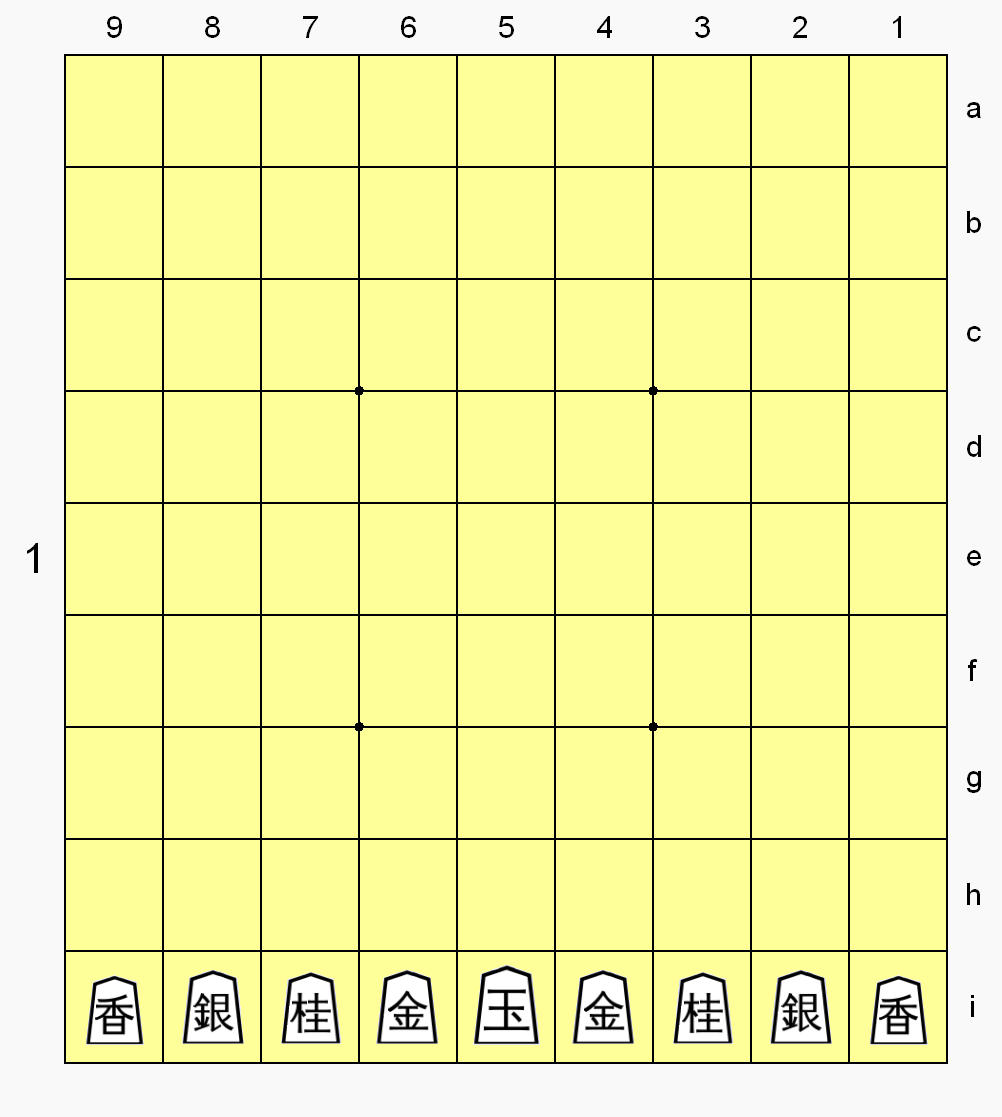
Black's level 1 (and White's level 9, rank a) starting setup. Unlike standard shogi, the silver is placed between the lance and the knight (8i and 2i in the diagram).

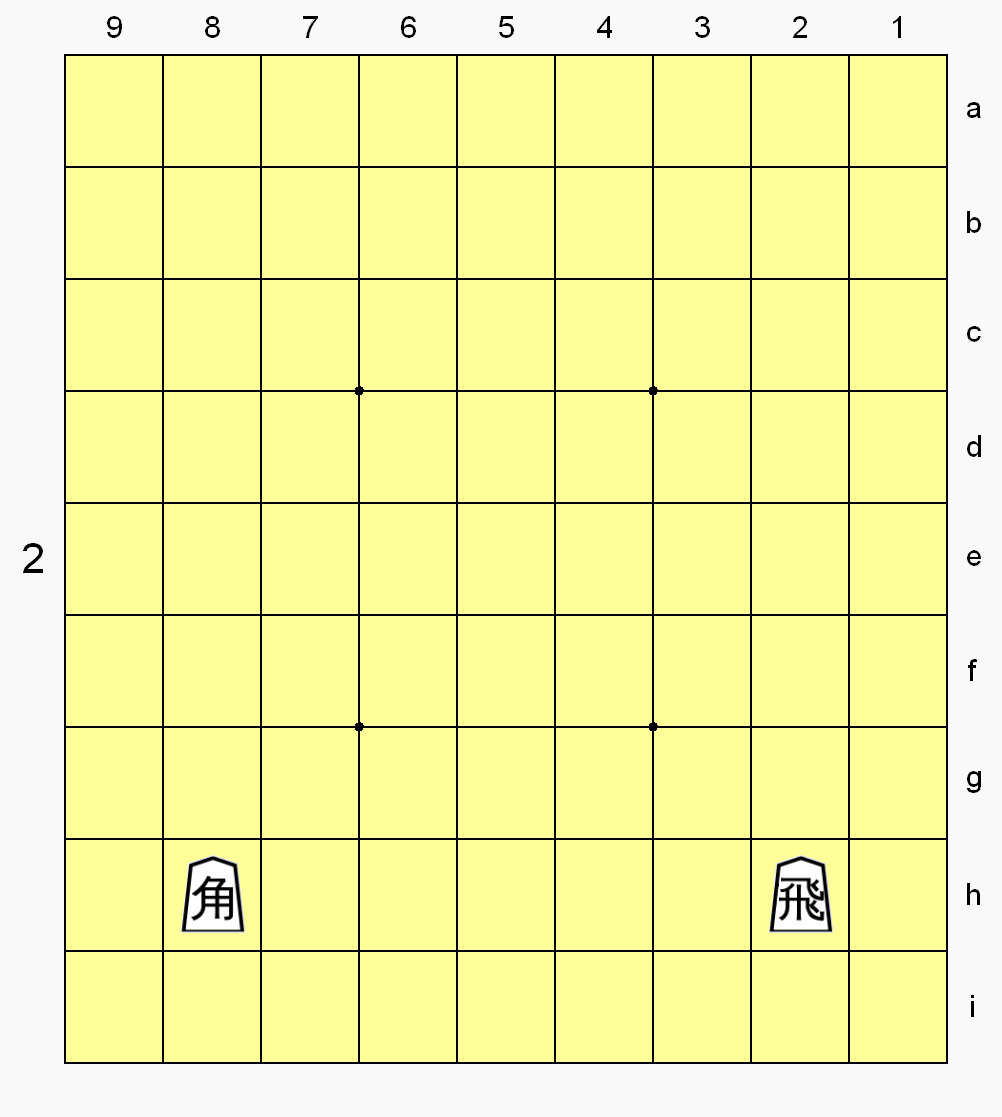
Black's level 2 (and White's level 8, rank b) starting setup. The bishop and rook occupy the same positions as in standard shogi.

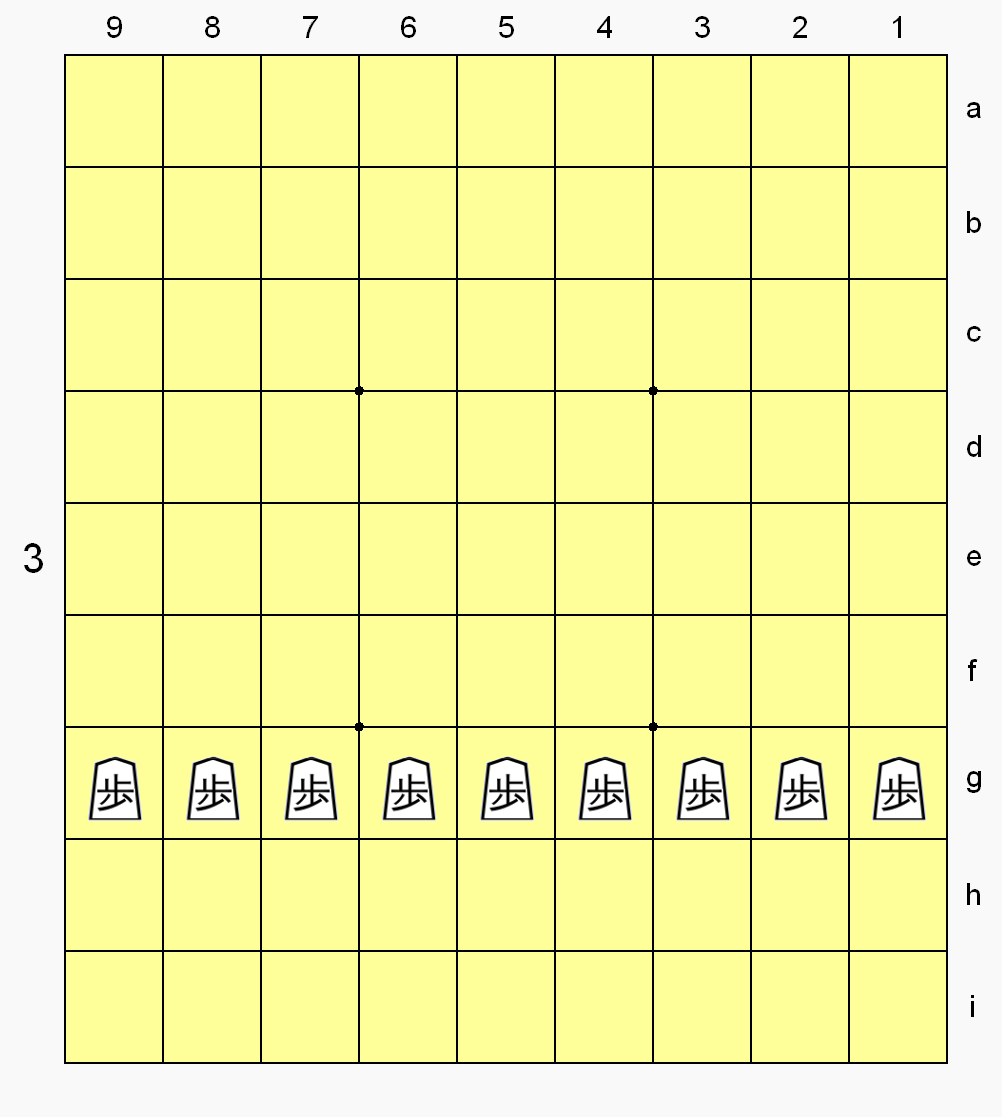
Black's level 3 (and White's level 7, rank c) starting setup. The pawns fill the same rank as in standard shogi.

== See also ==
- Three-dimensional chess
- Also by George Dekle:
  - Hexshogi – a variant with hexagonal cells
  - Trishogi – a variant with triangular cells
  - Masonic shogi – a variant with standard cells but staggered ranks
