= Worlds of the Federation =

Star Trek: The Worlds of the Federation
- First edition
- Author: Lora Johnson
- Illustrator: Lora Johnson
- Cover artist: Don Ivan Punchatz
- Language: English
- Subject: Star Trek
- Genre: Fiction
- Publisher: Pocket Books (US); Titan Books (UK)
- Publication date: 1989
- Publication place: United States
- Media type: Print
- ISBN: 0-671-66989-3
- OCLC: 28930257
- Dewey Decimal: 791.45/72 20
- LC Class: PN1992.77.S73 J65 1989

Star Trek: The Worlds of the Federation is a 1989 Star Trek reference manual written and illustrated by Lora Johnson.

The book is a manual of the worlds of the United Federation of Planets and their respective inhabitants and covers not only the stories from the original Star Trek but also from Star Trek: The Next Generation and Star Trek: The Animated Series.
