= Franz Joseph (artist) =

American artist (1914–1994)

Franz Joseph (born Franz Anton Joseph Schnaubelt; June 29, 1914 – June 2, 1994) was an artist and author loosely associated with the 1960s American television show Star Trek.

== Career ==
Born in Chicago, Franz Joseph had a successful 30-year career as an aerospace design engineer. However, he is perhaps best known as the author and illustrator of Star Fleet Technical Manual (ISBN 0-345-34074-4), which, though fictional, represents an in-universe collection of factual documents, detailing the 23rd century Star Fleet of the United Federation of Planets, as well as the function of the Starship U.S.S. Enterprise relative to the other starships in the fleet. The book contains information about uniforms (complete with sewing patterns), furniture, weapons, devices, protocols, and other minutiae from the Star Trek universe. Franz Joseph is also the author and illustrator of another in-universe document, Booklet of General Plans of the USS Enterprise (ISBN 0-345-25821-5, unofficially known as the Star Trek Blueprints), which is to date the only set of blueprints of the original Enterprise ever officially endorsed by Paramount Pictures, owners of the licensing rights to all things Star Trek.

On April 14, 1973, Franz Joseph witnessed a group of Star Trek fans at San Diego State University making (in his judgment) poor models of Star Trek memorabilia from various materials, and told them that he thought they could do better. In response, the fans challenged him to make better models than they had made, so Joseph set to work using a process of reverse orthographic drafting to create better models than the fans had. The fans were greatly impressed by his work and started asking him to convert many of the props to plans, essentially asking him to make a "technical manual" of Star Trek devices. Franz Joseph decided right then to make this manual. After making several technical plans for the Starship Enterprise and several supplemental Federation starships, Franz Joseph sent two of the plans (the plans for the Enterprise and the Dreadnought starship) to Gene Roddenberry, who immediately gave Franz approval to create an official Star Trek Technical Manual.

Franz Joseph decided that the manual would be "technically and scientifically correct". Franz himself has stated that his intention in drawing the plans was to elucidate the ship's design rather than to accurately depict exactly what viewers saw on their television screens. As a result, there are multiple minor discrepancies between Franz's plans and the filming miniatures that were used in the show, all of which are intentional, and made in the interest of establishing greater continuity. This approach was chosen due to the fact that Star Trek contains elements that were never seen on-screen, and the fact that even on-screen information is often contradictory.

The plans went on to gain immense popularity and were regarded by the US Department of Education, the National Geographic Society, Grumman Aircraft, and NASA as a topic of discussion.

Although they were published after the original show's cancellation, portions of both the Star Trek Blueprints and the Star Fleet Technical Manual have been used as on-screen displays in the Star Trek films and later television series.

Lou Zocchi designed and published the Star Fleet Battle Manual (1977) set of miniatures rules, which he licensed from Franz Joseph. Despite the fact that the violent nature of a starship combat game made Joseph apprehensive, Stephen V. Cole eventually persuaded Joseph to agree to a license so that Task Force Games could publish Star Fleet Battles (1979).

As an unexpected legacy, Franz Joseph's blueprint and book are responsible for beginning the subgenre revolving around the blueprints and schematics of fictional vehicles and locations from Star Trek: The drawings inspired fans to create their own unofficial blueprints of other invented spacecraft intended to fit into the Star Trek idiom.

== See also ==
- List of Star Trek Technical Manuals
