= Ferdinand Maack =

German doctor and inventor (1861-1930)

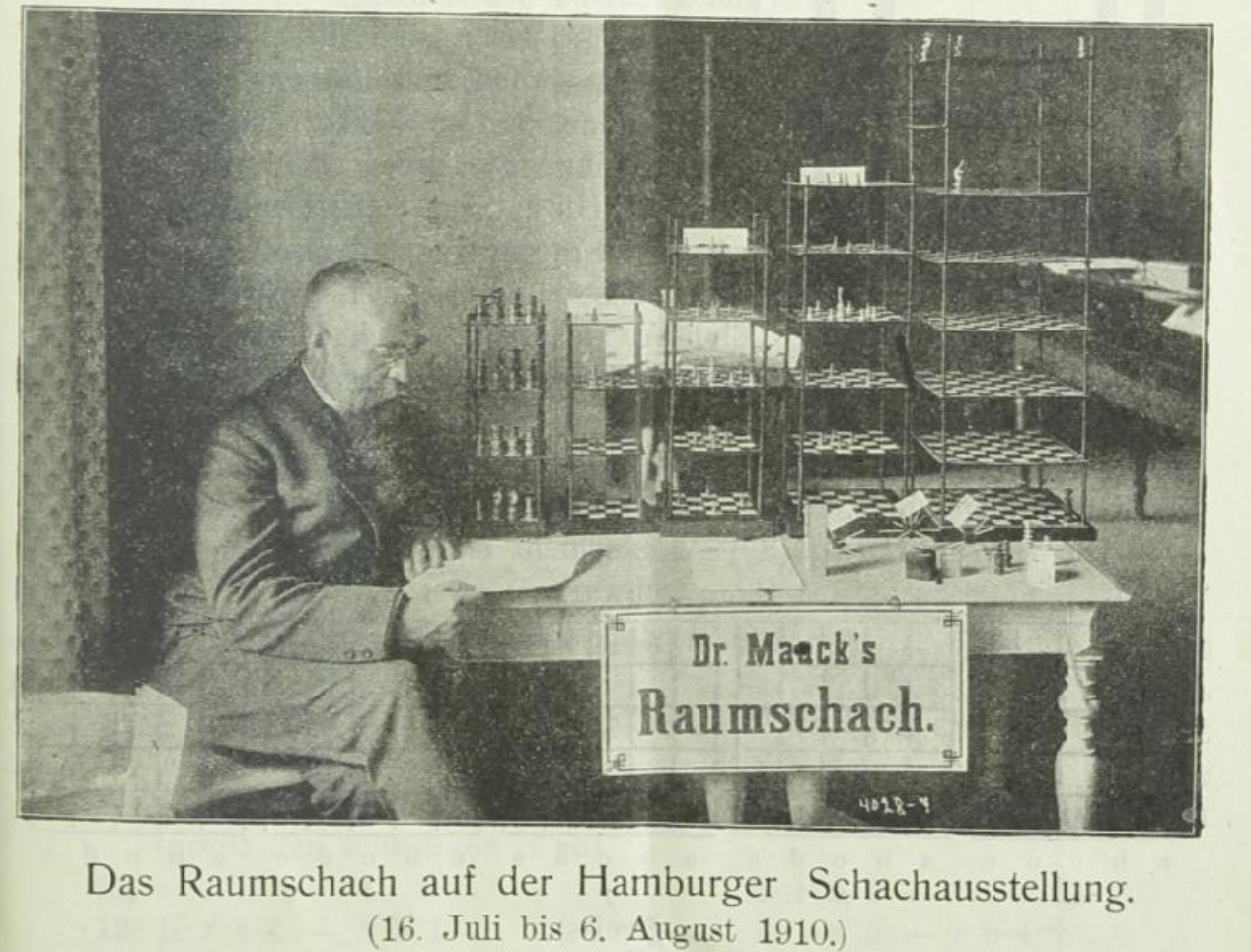
Ferdinand Maack demonstrating his various Raumschach variants at the Hamburg Chess Exhibition

Ferdinand Maack (1861–1930) was a German doctor, inventor and occultist. He invented Raumschach, the classic 3D chess game, first described by him in the Frankfurter Zeitung in 1907. He promoted the game with demonstrations, articles, specialist magazines (Note: E.g. Raumschach.) and several books. (Note: Das Schachraumspiel: Dreidimensionales Schachspiel (printed 1907); Spielregeln zum Raumschach (1913); Raumschach: Einführung in die Spielpraxis (1919).) He founded the Hamburg Raumschach Club in 1919, which remained active until World War II.

== Writings ==
- Die Weisheit von der Welt-Kraft. Eine Dynamosophie. Mit einem Vorwort über die Röntgen-Strahlen. Otto Weber, Leipzig 1897
- Polarchemiatrie. Ein Beitrag zur Einigung alter und neuer Heilkunst. Altmann, Leipzig 1905
- Die goldene Kette Homers. Lorch 1905; Graz 2005
- Das Schachraumspiel. (Dreidimensionales Schachspiel.) Eine neue praktisch interessante und theoretisch wichtige Erweiterung des zweidimensionalen Schachbrettspiels. A. Stein, Potsdam 1908
- Zweimal gestorben! Die Geschichte eines Rosenkreuzers aus dem XVIII. Jahrhundert. Nach urkundlichen Quellen, mit literarischen Belegen und einer Abhandlung über vergangene und gegenwärtige Rosenkreuzerei. Wilhelm Heims, Leipzig 1912; Graz 2007, ISBN 978-3-902640-57-4
- Spielregeln zum Raumschach. Staub, Berlin 1913
- Elias Artista redivivus oder Das Buch vom Salz und Raum. Hermann Barsdorf, Berlin 1913; Graz 2008
- Die schwarze Lilie. Stimmen aus dem Abgrund zu Kritik und Krisis von Theosophie und Spiritismus. Heims, Leipzig 1914; Graz 2007, ISBN 978-3-902640-56-7
- Raumschach. Einführung in die Spielpraxis. Selbstverlag, Hamburg 1919
- Thesen über den Ursprung des Lebens, um 1920
- Das Wesen der Alchemie. Baum, Pfullingen 1921; Graz 2005
- Das zweite Gehirn. Betrachtungen über die zukünftigen Aufgaben eines wissenschaftlichen Okkultismus. Theosophia, Hamburg 1921
- Die heilige Mathesis. Beiträge zur Magie des Raumes und der Zahl. Talis, Leipzig 1924; Graz 2008, ISBN 978-3-902640-55-0
- Talisman Turc. Ein Beitrag zur magisch-quadratischen Dechiffrierung von Liebes- und Krankheits-Amuletten, zum Ursprung und Wesen Magischer Quadrate sowie zur wissenschaftlichen Periodologie. Madaus, Radeburg 1926; Bohmeier, Leipzig 2009, ISBN 978-3-89094-612-2
