= Star Trek Star Fleet Technical Manual =

1975 fiction reference book by Franz Joseph

- Front cover insert, first edition
- Author: Franz Joseph Schnaubelt
- Language: English
- Subject: Star Trek: The Original Series
- Genre: Fiction
- Publisher: Ballantine Books
- Publication date: 1975
- Publication place: United States
- Media type: Print
- ISBN: 0-345-24730-2
- OCLC: 80927217

The Star Trek Star Fleet Technical Manual (ISBN 0345247302, Ballantine Books 1975, reprinted 1986, 1996, 2006) is a fiction reference book by Franz Joseph Schnaubelt, about the workings of Starfleet, a military, exploratory, and diplomatic organization featured in the television series Star Trek.

Although it is fiction, the book is presented as an in-universe collection of factual documents, describing the 23rd century Starfleet and United Federation of Planets, and it is described as having been accidentally sent from the future to the 20th century—specifically, when as described in "Tomorrow Is Yesterday", the starship USS Enterprise was accidentally propelled back in time in a freak mishap, causing the manual's contents to be accidentally downloaded into the main computers of the now-closed Omaha Air Force Station.

== Contents ==
The book provides some detail on the workings of technology used in the original series, including its ships, phasers, tricorders, universal translators, and medical equipment, and even diagrams for a working communicator built using 20th century electronics. It also contains plans for 3-dimensional chess, and lays out some basic game rules.

== History ==
In 1973, Joseph and his daughter joined a San Diego Trek appreciation society called STAR, the members of which spent time making their own Trek props and costumes. Using his aerospace design talents, he began making technical drawings of phasers and tricorders. He quickly amassed a large collection and sent copies to a very impressed Gene Roddenberry, whose wife Majel Barrett's company, Lincoln Enterprises, was producing Trek memorabilia at the time. Though he considered the franchise dead, Roddenberry encouraged Joseph to seek Barrett's help in creating a manual, a project blessed with privileged access to original props and carpenter's blueprints.

The book was published by Ballantine Books, a division of Random House, November 1975. The format was a paperback book, contained within a removable rigid black plastic binder, much like a typical real world technical manual. The binder featured a clear front pocket, within which the "dust jacket" of the book was placed. It could be removed, with the plastic binder reading only "STAR FLEET TECHNICAL MANUAL", just as a real manual might appear. It took the number one spot on The New York Times trade paperback list, breaking the existing record for profitability. Its success hinted at the brand's great potential, and within a year of its publication, Paramount and Roddenberry contracted to begin work on a Star Trek movie.

== Use as reference material ==
The book was culled for background imagery in the first three Trek films. Elements from the manual that appear on screen include:

- Listings of starship names, adapted for opening-scene backgrounds at the communications outpost in Star Trek: The Motion Picture;
- Starship class schematics, seen in background bridge displays in the Kobayashi Maru test in Star Trek II: The Wrath of Khan; and
- USS Enterprise plans, used in Star Trek III: The Search for Spock in a monitor display when the seal on Spock's living quarters is broken.

In addition, the manual, along with semi-official blueprints available at the time of the Klingon and Romulan ships, was a major source for the initial designs used for Federation ships for the board game Star Fleet Battles.

A Kelvin Timeline of Star Trek version of the Saladin Class Destroyer from the manual appears in the mobile and PC game Star Trek Fleet Command.
