= List of chess endgame study composers =

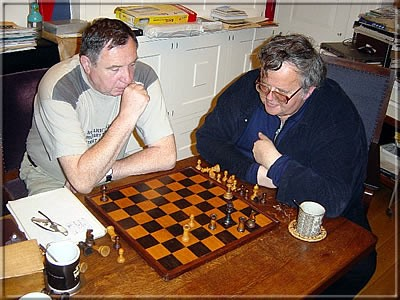
Nikolaj Kralin and Yochanan Afek

This is a list of chess endgame study composers ordered alphabetically by surname. Russian names may be written with other spellings.

- Yochanan Afek (born 1952). Israeli chess master and composer of endgame studies and problems. Grandmaster for chess compositions (2015). He published about 120 studies and won many awards, e.g. eleven first prizes.
- Iuri Akobia (born 1937–2014). Georgian composer of over 300 studies and author of many books on endgame composition, among which 4332 Studies with Stalemate, 4492 Studies with Mate, 4324 Studies with Positional draw. By profession a radiotechnical engineer, he worked for many years in the Georgian National TV station.
- Friedrich Amelung (1842–1909). Estonian composer of about 230 studies.
- Ghamiet Amirjan (born 1934). Armenian composer of over 300 studies.
- Yuri Averbakh (born 1922). Russian Grandmaster (winner of a Soviet Championship in 1954) and composer of over 200 studies, many of which give important contributions to endgame theory. With Chekhover and others he published in 1956 a four-volumes encyclopedia on endgames: "Lehrbuch der Endspiele".
- Yuri Bazlov (born 1947) . Russian composer of about 120 studies, winner of 16 first prizes. In 2005 and 2006 he won the PCCC "Study of the Year" award.
- Pal Benko (born 1928). Born in France from Hungarian parents, he emigrated to the United States in 1956. A Hungarian-American grandmaster over the board, he composed many endgame studies, winning 24 first prizes.
- Charles Bent (1919–2004). English composer of over 800 studies, winner of seven first prizes.
- Johann Berger (1845–1933). Austrian chess master, composer of about 250 studies and author of many chess publications.
- Rinaldo Bianchetti (1882–1963). Italian endgame composer. In 1925 he published " Contributo alla teoria dei finali di soli pedoni " in which he proposed the theory of reciprocal squares in pawn endings.
- Filip Bondarenko (1905–1993). Ukrainian composer of over 400 studies, winner of 19 first prizes. Author of many books, among which Triumph of the Russian Study (1955).
- Vladimir Bron (1909–1985). Russian composer of over 400 studies and winner of 29 first prizes. Grandmaster for chess composition and author of many books, e.g. Selected studies and problems (1969).

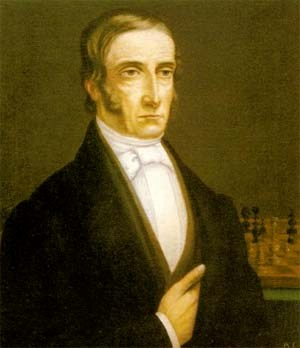
Ignazio Calvi

- Ignazio Calvi (1797–1872). Italian chess player and composer. He was the first to use the theme of under-promotion in endgame studies with some depth.
- Oscar Carlsson (born 1929). Argentinian International Judge for chess composition, author of about 80 endgame studies.
- Vitaly Chekhover (1908–1965). Russian chess master and composer of about 150 studies. He is considered a major specialist on knight endgames. Together with Yuri Averbakh he published in 1956 a four-volume encyclopedia on endgames.
- André Chéron (1895–1980). French player and composer of over 300 studies. He won the France championship in 1926–27–29, then turned fully to endgame composition. Many of his studies are considered classics of endgame theory. Author of many books and a three-volume anthology of endgame studies (1952).
- Luigi Centurini (1820–1900). Italian player and composer born in Genoa, he gave notable contributions to endgame theory, e.g. Bishop vs. Rook and pawns, Queen vs. Rook.
- František Dedrle (1878–1957). Czech composer of about 260 endgame studies.
- Emilian Dobrescu (born 1933). Romanian composer and author of many books, among which Chess Study Composition. He published about 400 works, winning 64 first prizes. By profession he is a university teacher of Economic Sciences.
- Vasily Nikitovich Dolgov (1924–2005). Russian composer of more than 300 studies.
- Oldřich Duras (1882–1957). Czech master, in 1914 he retired from over-the-board play and turned fully to endgame composition, winning 10 first prizes.
- Paul Farago (1886–1970). Born in Hungary, he moved to Romania at age 24 and lived there for the rest of his life. An engineer by profession, from 1936 he was editor of the Romanian chess review. He composed over 200 studies, winning 19 first prizes.
- Jindřich Fritz (1912–1984). Czech composer of over 500 studies and problems, in 26 of which he won first prize. Together with Richard Réti he was a follower of the "Bohemian School", in which most studies end in elegant checkmates or stalemates. He was a lawyer by profession.
- Daniele Guglielmo Gatti (born 1987). Italian composer of about 255 studies and 630 problems. First achiever of a complete, sound and legal Babson Task in the form of an endgame study.
- Tigran Gorgiev (1910–1976). Russian composer of about 500 studies. He is considered among the major representatives of the grotesque genre, in which the initial position cannot be reached in practical play. He won 31 first prizes.

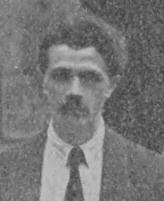
Nikolay Grigoriev

- Nikolay Grigoriev (1895–1938). Russian chess master and composer of over 300 studies. He is considered an authority for only pawns and Rooks and pawns endgames.
- Alexander Gulyaev-Grin (born 1908). Russian endgame and problem composer. He adopted the pseudonym "Grin" for tourneys in western countries. Author of about 200 works and winner of many major prizes.
- David Gurgenidze (born 1953). Georgian composer, FIDE Grandmaster for composition. He published more than 600 studies, winning 32 first prizes. He often worked together with Iuri Akobia.
- Abram Gurvich (1897–1962). Russian endgame composer, called "The Poet" for the beauty of many of his works, most of which were miniatures (with a maximum of seven pieces). Author in 1955 of "Soviet Chess Problems", by profession he was a theatrical and literary reviewer.
- Vitaly Halberstadt (1903–1968). Ukrainian-born study composer, emigrated to France in 1925. Author of about 200 studies, some of which with Leonid Kubbel. With Marcel Duchamp he published in 1932 "L'opposition et les cases conjuguées sont réconciliées". Nine of his studies were awarded first prize.
- Harold van der Heijden (born 1960). Dutch composer of about 100 studies and author of a database containing 93,839 studies (2020).
- Alexander Herbstmann (1900–1982). Russian composer, FIDE International Judge, winner of 18 first prizes. Sometimes spelled "Gerbstmann".
- Jehuda Hoch (born 1946). Israeli composer of about 150 studies, three of which won first prize.
- David Vincent Hooper (1915–1998). English player and composer, author of A Pocket guide to chess endgames.
- Bernhard Horwitz (1807–1885). German composer of c. 400 studies and author with Josef Kling of the first anthology of endgames: Chess Studies London 1851.
- Alexander Sergeyevich Kakovin (1910–1979). Russian composer.
- Velimir Kalandadze (born 1935). Georgian composer of about 250 studies, winner of six first prizes.
- Genrikh Kasparyan (1910–1995). Foremost Armenian player (ten times winner of the Armenian Championship) and composer. He was the first studist to be awarded the title of Grand Master of composition from FIDE (1972). Author of about 600 works, many of which on the theme of domination, he won 57 first prizes.
- Alexander Kazantsev (1906–2002). Russian composer of about 120 studies, winner of 11 first prizes. He was also a successful science-fiction writer.
- Paul Keres (1916–1975). A very strong Estonian Grandmaster, he composed about 60 endgame studies.
- Josef Kling (1811–1876). German master and composer of some 400 studies, most of which together with Bernhard Horwitz.
- Theodorus Kok (1906–1999). Dutch composer of about 300 studies. Winner of two first prizes, one of which in 1934 with a famous miniature.
- Viktor Kondratjev (1945–2001). Russian composer of over 200 studies, many of which together with A. Kopnin.
- Nikolai Kopayev (1914–1978). Russian composer of about 80 studies, one of the major experts in Rook and pawns endgames.
- Attila Koranyi (1934–1997). Hungarian composer of about 150 studies, FIDE Judge for composition (1984), winner of 34 first prize awards.
- Vladimir Korolkov (1907–1987). Russian composer of over 300 studies, he was a chief representative of the paradoxical and romantic genre. FIDE Grandmaster for composition and winner of 27 first prizes.
- Vladimír Kos (1928–2007). Czech composer of about 60 studies, International Judge for composition (1991). He was an engineer by profession.
- Nikolaj Kralin (born 1944). Russian Grandmaster of composition. Author of some 300 studies, he won more than 30 first prizes.
- Josif Krikheli (1931–1988). Georgian Jewish composer of about 70 studies, winner of six first prizes in international tourneys.

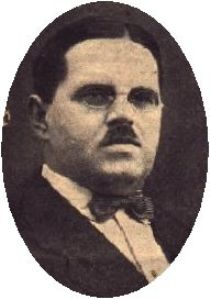
Leonid Kubbel

- Leonid Kubbel (1891–1942). Foremost Russian composer of over 500 studies, many of which were awarded first prize for their great beauty and original conception. Also his brothers Ardid and Evgeny were chess players, Ardid being a strong master (he played in the first four USSR championships) and Evgeny a chess composer. Both Leonid and Evgeny Kubbel died of starvation during the Nazi siege of Leningrad.
- Alexander Petrovich Kuznetsov (1913–1982). Russian composer of more than 490 published studies.
- Mark Liburkin (1910–1953). Russian composer of studies of supreme elegance, many of which won first prize.
- Harold Lommer (1910–1980). British player and composer of over 100 studies.
- Jan Hendrik Marwitz (1915–1991). Dutch composer of about 150 studies, winner of 16 first prizes.
- Hermanis Matisons (English: Hermann Mattison) (1894–1932). Latvian player and composer.
- Emil Melnichenko (born 1950). Czech-New Zealand composer of over 200 studies, winner of six first prizes.
- Martin Minski (born 1969). German composer of about 600 studies. Grandmaster for chess compositions. Second place winner of the 2016–2018 World Championship of Composing for Individuals.
- Leopold Mitrofanov (1932–1992). Russian composer of over 200 studies, winner of 40 first prizes.
- Josef Moravec (1882–1969). Czech composer of over 200 studies.
- Gia Nadareishvili (1921–1991). Georgian composer of a few hundred studies, many of which together with Yuri Akobia. Editor of an anthology of 312 studies commented by famous Grandmasters. International master of composition, winner of 27 first prizes.
- Virgil Nestorescu (born 1929). Romanian Grandmaster of study composition. Author of about 200 studies, he won 26 first prizes.
- John Nunn (born 1955). A very strong English Grandmaster and composer of over 300 studies, he is a major expert in compiling endgame tablebases for chess-playing engines. Two times World Champion for solving of chess compositions (2004 and 2007).
- Enrico Paoli (1908–2005). Italian Grandmaster "Honoris Causa" (1996) and composer of about 150 studies. Author of many books on the endgame, e.g. 96 Studi Scacchistici and Il Finale negli Scacchi.
- Edmund Peckover (1897–1982). English/American composer of over 100 studies.
- Pauli Perkonoja (born 1941). Finnish study composer, International master of composition from 1969 and world champion of problem solving in 1995.
- Oleg Pervakov. Russian composer of about 100 studies, winner of more than 20 first prizes. One of them, a study of with only pawns, is quite famous. He works as a chess journalist for the Russian chess magazine "64". Four times World champion in study composition. Grandmaster for chess compositions (2005).
- Platov brothers Mikhail (1883–1938) and Vassily (1881–1952). Latvian brothers, they composed over 300 studies, most of them together.
- Ernest Pogosyants (1935–1990). He published 1790 studies, making him the most prolific of all composers. He won 22 first prizes.
- Ladislav Prokeš (1884–1966). Czech composer of 1159 published studies.
- František Prokop (1901–1973). Czech composer of about 300 studies. Author of many books, e.g. The Magic of Chess Diagrams in 1968.

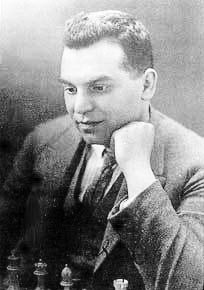
Richard Réti

- Richard Réti (1889–1929). Czech Grand Master and composer of some 100 studies, one of which, an ending with only pawns, is very famous (see diagram in this article).
- Henri Rinck (Lyon 1870 – Badalona 1952). French study composer, he emigrated to Spain in 1910. He published 1670 studies, winning 58 first prizes. A chemist by profession, he devised the Rinck Code for diagrams classification.
- Pietro Rossi (born 1924). Italian composer of over 100 studies. The Italian Chess Federation (FSI) awarded him a gold medal in 2007 for his merits in the field of chess composition.
- John Roycroft (born 1929). English Honorary Master of chess composition. Author of many publications and editor of the study and problems section of New in Chess. Founder (1965) and editor-in-chief of the quarterly magazine EG, entirely dedicated to endgame studies.
- Jan Rusinek (born 1950). Polish Grandmaster for chess composition, winner of 32 first prizes.
- Fernando Saavedra (1847–1922). Spanish composer, later settled in Britain. Famous for a study demonstrating that an underpromotion to Rook wins an endgame previously considered as drawn (Glasgow 1895). See diagram in this article.
- Franz Sackmann (1888–1927). German composer of over 100 endgame studies.
- Boris Sakharov (1914–1973). Russian composer of about 70 studies. By profession an electronics engineer, he was the first vice-president of the FIDE Problems Commission.
- Alexander Sarychev (1909–1987). Russian composer of over 100 studies, most of which with minor pieces and pawns. Winner of 10 first prizes.
- Alexey Selezniev (1888–1967). Russian player and study composer.
- Vasily Smyslov (1921–2010). Russian Grandmaster, World Champion 1957–1958. Composer of many studies and author with Levenfish of a work on Rook and pawns endgames.
- Edward Cecil Tattersall (1877–1957). British composer and author in 1910 of the first English-language collection of selected studies: A Thousand Endgames.
- Jan Timman (born 1950). Dutch Grandmaster and composer of 145 endgame studies.

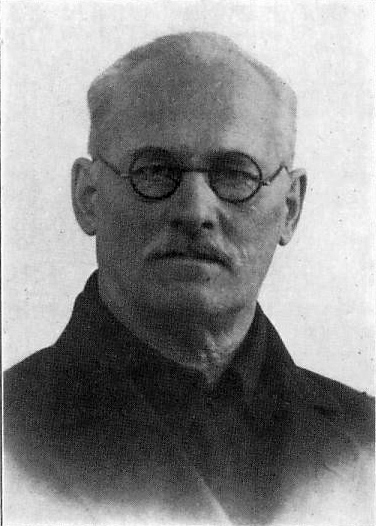
Alexey A. Troitsky

- Alexey Troitsky (1866–1942). Foremost Russian composer considered the father of the contemporary school of study composition. Author of over 1000 studies with important contributions to endgame theory, especially of knights vs. pawns.
- Julien Gustave Vandiest (born 1919). Belgian composer of 398 studies, winner of 10 first prizes.
- Milan Vukcevich (1937–2003). American player and composer born in Yugoslavia. He was the first American citizen to be awarded the title of FIDE Grandmaster of composition (1988). Third in the United States championship 1975 above Reshevsky, Byrne and Evans, for many years he was considered the strongest in the world for problem solving. By profession an electrical engineer, he was for many years in the scientific staff of the General Electric company.
- Gleb Zakhodyakin (1912–1982). Russian composer of about 200 studies and winner of many first prizes.
- Mikhail Zinar (born 1951). Ukrainian composer of about 280 studies, most of which of the king-and-pawns type. Considered by many as the greatest expert in pawn endgames. Author of "Harmony in Pawn's Studies", Kyiv 1990.
