= Velimir Kalandadze =

Georgian physicist and chess composer

Personal information
- Born: May 10, 1935 Lagodekhi, Georgian SSR, Soviet Union
- Died: October 27, 2017 (aged 82) Tbilisi, Georgia

Chess career
- Title: International Master of Chess Composition (1984)

Velimir Kalandadze (Georgian: ველიმირ კალანდაძე; May 10, 1935 – October 27, 2017) was a Georgian physicist and chess composer. He held the titles of Master of Chess Composition (1979) and International Master of Chess Composition (1984). In over-the-board chess he achieved the rank of Candidate Master of Sports of the USSR.

Kalandadze was a laureate of numerous international composition competitions. He won first prizes in the Lelo competition (1961, jointly with Vazha Neidze), the Olympic Composition Competition (1976, jointly with David Gurgenidze), Shakhmaty v SSSR (1979), and 64—Shakhmatnoye Obozreniye (1984), among others. He competed in 10 USSR Championships of Chess Composition between 1965 and 1985, with his best result being 4th place in the 14th Championship (1983). As a composer of endgame studies, he specialized in rook endings.

== Biography ==
From the 1950s, Kalandadze published chess problems in the newspaper Lelo, initially in collaboration with his father, Ioseb Kalandadze, and later independently. He graduated from the Faculty of Physics at Tbilisi State University and worked for several years in scientific institutions. Alongside composition, he was active in chess journalism and for many years edited chess columns in the newspapers Molodyozh Gruzii and Sakartvelos Respublika.

== Chess composition ==
Velimir Kalandadze
Metsniereba da Teknika, 1990

Position: f8 black king, a7 black rook, c7 white pawn, h7 white king, g6 black pawn, d4 black pawn, h3 white rook

Win (3 + 4)

This endgame study was named the best study of 1990.

Solution: 1. Rf3+ Ke8 2. Rf7! Ra8 3. Kg7 Rc8 4. Kf6 d3 5. Re7+ Kf8 6. Rh7 Rxc8 7. Rd7 d2 8. Rd8+ Kh7 9. Rxc8 d1=Q 10. Rh8+ Kxh8 11. c8=Q+ Kh7 12. Qh3+ Qh5 13. Qd7+ Kh6 14. Qg7#

Nona Gaprindashvili Jubilee, 2008
1st Prize

Position: b7 black queen, d7 white pawn, h7 white king, f6 black king, a4 white queen, a3 black pawn, a2 white pawn

Win

This study received first prize at the Nona Gaprindashvili Jubilee competition (2008) and was later named study of the year at the 2009 World Congress of Chess Composition.

Solution: 1. Qf4+! Ke6 2. Qf7+! Kxf7 3. d8=N+! Kf6+ 4. Nxb7 Ke5 5. Kg6 Kd4 6. Kf5 Kc3 7. Ke4 Kb2 8. Kd3 Kxa2 9. Kc2 Ka1 10. Nc5 Ka2 11. Nd3 Ka1 12. Nc1 a2 13. Nb3#

== Bibliography ==
- Kalandadze, V. (1972). 100 Studies (100 ეტიუდი). Tbilisi.
- Kalandadze, V. (1978). Endgame Study Ideas in Rook Endings (საეტიუდო იდეები ეტლების დაბოლოებაში). Tbilisi.
- Kalandadze, V. (1994). Perpetual Motion: 111 Chess Studies (მარადიული მოძრაობა: 111 საჭადრაკო ეტიუდი). Tbilisi.
- Kalandadze, V. (2005). In the World of Masterpieces (შედევრთა სამყაროში). Tbilisi.
- Kalandadze, V. (2012). The Angry Queen (განრისხებული ლაზიერი). Tbilisi.

== Literature ==
- Karpov, A. E., ed. (1990). Shakhmaty. Entsiklopedicheskiy slovar. Moscow. ISBN 5-85270-005-3.
- Giorgadze, T. (1995). Chronicle of Georgian Chess, Part I (ქართული ჭადრაკის მატიანე). Tbilisi.
- Giorgadze, T. (1997). Chronicle of Georgian Chess, Part II (ქართული ჭადრაკის მატიანე). Tbilisi.
- Giorgadze, T. (2000). Chronicle of Georgian Chess, Part III (ქართული ჭადრაკის მატიანე). Tbilisi.
