= Hugh Blandford =

Personal information
- Full name: Hugh Francis Blandford
- Born: 24 January 1917 Southampton, England
- Died: 20 September 1981 (aged 64) Hatfield, England

Chess career
- Country: England
- Title: International Judge for Chess Composition

Hugh Francis Blandford (24 January 1917 – 20 September 1981) was a chess endgame composer born in Southampton, England.

== Biography ==
Blandford spent several years of his childhood in Jamaica with his father, Albert Francis (Frank) Blandford, a minister in the Congregational church, his mother and two younger brothers. All three brothers then returned to England and attended Eltham College (the School for the Sons of Missionaries) in South-east London, while their parents remained in Jamaica. He married Marjorie Cox, whom he had worked with during the Second World War.

He played chess from his schooldays and as well as playing, also started to compose original chess endings. He became known in the field of chess endgame studies for a small but elegant body of compositions, expertly edited and published after Hugh's death by his long-standing chess endings colleague, John Roycroft.

Blandford was co-inventor with Richard Guy – and, later, with John Roycroft – of the Guy–Blandford–Roycroft code for classifying studies. In July 1951 he began as the endgame study editor for the British Chess Magazine. He was made an International Judge for Chess Composition in 1961.

A metallurgist, he continued to compose chess endgame studies until the end of his life, dying of a heart attack in early retirement in Hatfield, England, on 20 September 1981.

== Sample composition ==
1st Prize, Springaren 1949

Position: a7 black king, d7 white king, c3 white bishop, c2 white pawn, f1 black knight

White to move and win

This example of the excelsior theme might be his best-known composition. Solution:

1. Bd4+ Ka8 2. c4 Nd2 3. c5 Nb3 4. c6 Na5 5. c7 Nc6 6. c8=R+

6.Kxc6? stalemate; 6.c8=Q+? Nb8+ 7.K-any stalemate.

6... Nb8+ 7. Kd6

Winning.
