= GBR code =

System for representing classes of chess positions

Leonid Kubbel,
First Prize, Shakhmaty 1925

Position: g8 black knight, c6 black pawn, h6 white pawn, a3 black rook, c3 black pawn, g3 white king, a2 white bishop, e1 white bishop, g1 black king

White to play and draw
GBR code of this study: =0323.12g3g1

The GBR code (or Guy–Blandford–Roycroft code) is a system of representing the position of chess pieces on a chessboard. Publications such as EG use it to classify endgame types and to index endgame studies.

The code is named after Richard Guy, Hugh Blandford and John Roycroft. The first two devised the original system (the Guy–Blandford code) using different figures to represent the number of pieces. Roycroft suggested to count one for a white piece and three for a black piece in order to make the code easier to memorise.

== Definition ==
In the GBR code, every chess position is represented by six digits, in the following format:

abcd.ef

- a = queens
- b = rooks
- c = bishops
- d = knights
- e = white pawns
- f = black pawns

For the first four digits, each of the first two white pieces counts as 1, and each of the first two black pieces counts as 3. Thus, for example, if White has two knights and Black has one knight, numeral d = 1 + 1 + 3 = 5. If that is all the material other than the kings, the position is classified 0005. Values 0 through 8 represent all normal permutations of force. 9 is used if either side has three or more pieces of the same non-pawn type; these positions are possible in standard chess due to pawn promotion.

The last two digits of the code represent the number of white and black pawns, respectively.

== Usage ==
GBR code can be used to refer to a general class of material. For example, the endgame of two knights against pawn (as famously analysed by A.A. Troitsky, leading to his discovery of the Troitsky line), is GBR class 0002.01.

When indexing or referring to specific positions, rather than generalised material imbalances, the code may be extended in various ways. Two common ones are to prefix "+" to indicate the stipulation "White to play and win" or "=" for "White to play and draw"; and to suffix the position of the white and black kings. With these additions, the position to the right, a draw study by Leonid Kubbel (First Prize, Shakhmaty, 1925), is classified as =0323.12g3g1. (The solution is: 1.Bf2+ Kh1 2.h7 c2+ 3.Be3 Rxe3+ 4.Kf2 Rh3 5.Bd5+ cxd5 6.hxg8=Q Rh2+ 7.Kf3 c1=Q 8.Qg2+ Rxg2.) The positions of other pieces can also be added; this produces a notation that provides the same information as Forsyth–Edwards Notation.

== Examples ==
White material	Black material	GBR class
KQ	K	1000
KR	K	0100
KB	K	0010
KN	K	0001
KNN	K	0002
K	KN	0003
KN	KN	0004
KNN	KN	0005
K	KNN	0006
KN	KNN	0007
KNN	KNN	0008
KNNN	KNN	0009
KPPP	KPP	0000.32
KNN	KP	0002.01
KBB	KN	0023
KQ	KR	1300
KQP	KQ	4000.10
KRP	KR	0400.10
KRRP	KRR	0800.10
KBBP	KNN	0026.10
KBBP	KRNPP	0323.12
