= Mikhail Zinar =

Ukrainian chess player (1950–2021)

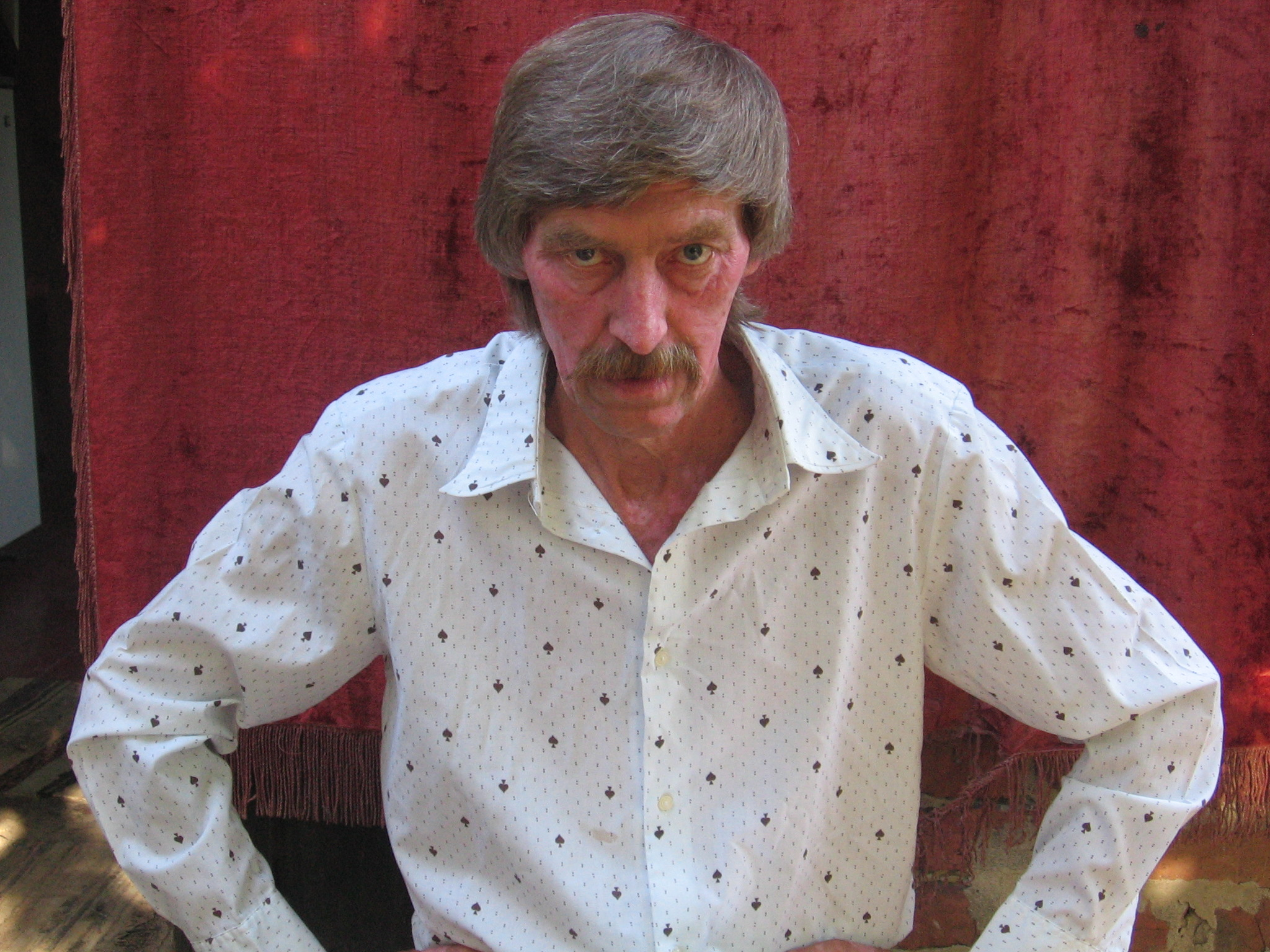

Personal information
- Born: Mikhail Afanasevich Zinar; 22 November 1950
- Died: 4 February 2021 (aged 70) Hvosdavka Persha, Odesa Oblast

Chess career
- Country: Ukraine

Mikhail Afanasevich Zinar (Ukrainian: Михайло Опанасович Зинар; Russian: Михаил Афанасьевич Зинар; 22 November 1950 – 4 February 2021) was a Ukrainian chess endgame study composer.

Zinar was born on 22 November 1950, but his passport states 9 May 1951. He spent his childhood and school years in Hvosdavka Persha in the Odessa Oblast in Ukraine.

Zinar was awarded the title of Master of Sport of the USSR in 1987. He won the bronze medal in the endgame studies competition of the 3rd FIDE World Cup in Composing in 2013.

== Chess composition ==
Shakhmaty v SSSR 1974

Position: e7 black king, d6 black pawn, d5 white pawn, g5 black pawn, d4 black pawn, g4 white pawn, d3 white pawn, g3 white pawn, d2 white king, g2 white pawn

White to play and win.

Solution: 1.Kc2! Kf7 2.Kb2! Kg6 3.Ka3! Kf6 4.Kb3! Kf5 5.Kb4! Kf4 (5...Ke5 6.Kc4+−) 6.Kb5! Ke3 7.Kc4 Kf3 8.Kxd4 Kf4 9.Kc3! and White wins.

Shakhmaty v SSSR 1981, 1st sp. prize

Position: f8 white king, c7 black pawn, c5 black king, c3 white pawn, e2 white pawn

White to play and win.

Solution: 1.Kg7! Kd5 2.Kf7 Ke5 3.Ke7 Kd5 4.Kd7 Kc4 5.Kc6! Kxc3 6.Kc5! Kd2 7.e4 and White wins.

3rd UAPA Internet Tourney 2016

Position: b8 black king, g7 black pawn, h7 black pawn, a6 white king, b5 white pawn, a4 white pawn

White to play and win.

Solution: 1.a5! (1.Kb6? h5!−+; 1.b6? g5!−+) 1...g5 (1...h5 2.b6 h4 3.b7 h3 4.Kb6 h2 5.a6 h1=Q 6.a7#) 2.Kb6! g4 3.a6 g3 4.a7+ Ka8 5.Ka6 g2 6.b6 g1=Q 7.b7#

== Notes ==
=== Sources ===
- Tkachenko, Sergei (2008). "КОРОЛИ ШАХМАТНОЙ ПЕХОТЫ. Часть вторая" [Kings of Chess Infantry (part two)] (in Russian).
- Akobia, Iuri (2013). "The 3rd FIDE World Cup in Composing: Section D – Endgame studies" (PDF).

=== General references ===
- Zinar, Mikhail Afanasevich; Archakov, Vladimir Mikhaĭlovich (1990). Гармония пешечного этюда [Harmony in the Pawn Study] (in Russian). Kyiv: Radyanska Schkola. ISBN 5-330-00853-0.
- Sergei, Tkachenko (2018). Mikhail Zinar's Difficult Pawn Endings. Elk and Ruby Publishing House. ISBN 978-5604071021.
- Mikhail, Zinar (2022). Sergei Tkachenko (ed.). The Pawn Study Composer's Manual. Elk and Ruby Publishing House. ISBN 978-5604784846.

== See also ==
- Endgame study
- List of chess endgame study composers
