= Saavedra position =

Chess endgame study by Fernando Saavedra

Saavedra position

Position: b6 white king, c6 white pawn, d5 black rook, a1 black king

White to move and win

The Saavedra position is one of the best-known chess endgame studies. It is named after the Spanish priest Fernando Saavedra (1849–1922), who lived in Glasgow during the late 19th century. Though not a strong player, he spotted a win involving a dramatic underpromotion in a position previously thought to have been a draw.

The Saavedra position has inspired many chess composers. There are only four pieces, yet there are both tricks and counter-tricks, challenging a composer's imagination as to just what might be achievable with a full set of pieces. It is among a minority of positions where a king and a pawn can win against a king and a rook.

== Solution ==
The position as it is usually given today, with White to move and win, is shown in the diagram. The solution is:

1. c7 Rd6+ 2. Kb5

(If 2.Kc5? then 2...Rd1, threatening a skewer via 3...Rc1!; if instead 2.Kb7? then 2...Rd7 pins the pawn, allowing Black to capture it to assure a draw.)

2... Rd5+

Or 2...Rd2 3.c8=Q Rb2+ 4.Ka4 Ra2+ 5.Kb3 Rb2+ 6.Kc3 and White wins. Note that if Black's king were on b1, 6...Rc2+ would win, so White must acquiesce to a draw by perpetual check.

3. Kb4 Rd4+ 4. Kb3 Rd3+ 5. Kc2

It looks like Black is out of squares, but he has one last attempt.

5... Rd4!

Now if 6. c8=Q? Rc4+! 7.Qxc4 is stalemate.

6. c8=R!!

This is the move that Saavedra introduced. White threatens 7.Ra8+ and mate. Material is even, but the unfortunate positions of Black's king and rook doom him to a loss.

6... Ra4 7. Kb3

Black must either lose the rook (allowing White an elementary checkmate) or be checkmated by 8.Rc1.

== History ==
Fenton vs. Potter, 1875

Position: h8 white rook, b6 white pawn, d6 white king, a5 white pawn, b5 black rook, g4 black king, h3 black pawn

The long history of the study has its origins in a game played between Richard Fenton and William Potter in 1875. From the position shown, the game continued 1.Rxh3 Kxh3 2.Kc6 Rxa5 3.b7 Ra6+ and the players agreed a draw. However, as Johannes Zukertort pointed out in the City of London Chess Magazine, 1875, White could have won with 4.Kc5 (not 4.Kb5 Ra1 when White cannot promote the pawn because of 5...Rb1+) 4...Ra5+ 5.Kc4 Ra4+ 6.Kc3 (or 6.Kb3 Ra1 7.Kb2) 6...Ra3+ 7. Kb2, and White will promote the pawn when the queen versus rook endgame is a theoretical win (this winning method had earlier been demonstrated in a study by Josef Kling and Bernhard Horwitz published in The Chess Player, September 1853).

G.E. Barbier, 1895

Position: c7 white pawn, b6 white king, h6 black king, d5 black rook

Upon Potter's death in March 1895, G.E. Barbier published a position in his Glasgow Weekly Citizen chess column of April 27, 1895, which he claimed to have occurred in Fenton–Potter. In fact, he had misremembered the game, and the position he published (see diagram) had never arisen. It was published as a study with Black to play and White to win; the technique is just that demonstrated by Zukertort and by Kling and Horwitz before him: 1... Rd6+ 2. Kb5 Rd5+ 3. Kb4 Rd4+ 4. Kb3 Rd3+ 5. Kc2.

When Barbier published this solution on May 4, he claimed that by moving the black king from h6 to a1 the position could be transformed into a "Black to move and draw" study. On May 11 he gave the solution 1... Rd6+ 2. Kb5 Rd5+ 3. Kb4 Rd4+ 4. Kb3 Rd3+ 5. Kc2 Rd4! 6. c8=Q Rc4+ 7. Qxc4 stalemate; however, as Saavedra pointed out, 6. c8=R instead wins, a solution published by Barbier on May 18. Saavedra, a Spanish priest who lived in Glasgow at the time, was a weak amateur player; his sole claim to fame in the chess world is his discovery of this move. The modern form of the position was obtained by Emanuel Lasker (in The Brooklyn Daily Eagle, June 1, 1902, p. 53) by moving the c7-pawn back to c6 and changing the stipulation to the standard "White to play and win".

== Alternate line ==
As computer-generated endgame tablebases confirm, Black can offer longer resistance by 3...Kb2, for which White has only one winning reply, 4.c8=Q, promoting to a queen instead of the underpromotion to a rook. Then White can force checkmate on the twenty-sixth move. However, per the normal conventions of endgame studies, moves that result in positions known to be theoretically lost, such as the resulting queen versus rook endgame, are considered sidelines.

== Legacy ==
Mark Liburkin, 1931

Position: c6 white pawn, b5 white pawn, c5 black rook, a2 white knight, a1 black king, d1 white king

White to play and win

The study has been widely reproduced, and in Test Tube Chess, John Roycroft calls it "unquestionably the most famous of all endgame studies". It has inspired many other composers: the many promotions in the studies of Harold Lommer, for example, were inspired by the Saavedra position. Mark Liburkin was also one such composer.

A number of composers have produced work which elaborates on the basic Saavedra idea including the one by Mark Liburkin (second prize, Shakhmaty v SSSR, 1931) where White is to play and win. After the first move 1.Nc1, Black has two main defences; the first of these shows the Saavedra theme: 1.Nc1 Rxb5 (1...Kb2 2.Nd3+ wins) 2.c7 Rd5+ 3.Nd3! Rxd3+ 4.Kc2 Rd4 and we have a position already seen in the Saavedra position itself; White wins with 5.c8=R Ra4 6.Kb3.

The other Black defence features two new stalemate defences, and a second underpromotion, this time to bishop; this is why this study is well-known while many other elaborations on the Saavedra position are forgotten: 1.Nc1 Rd5+ 2.Kc2 (2.Nd3? Rxd3+ 3.Kc2 Rd5! 4.Kc3 Rxb5 draws; 2.Ke2? Rxb5 3.c7 Re5+ draws) 2...Rc5+ 3.Kd3! (3.Kd2? Rxb5 4.c7 [4.Nb3+ Rxb3 5.c7 Rb2+! – see below] Rb2+! 5.Kd1 Rc2! 6.Kxc2 stalemate) 3...Rxb5 (3...Rxc1 4.Kd4, intending 5.Kd5 and 6.b6, wins) 4.c7 Rb8! and now both 5.cxb8=Q and 5.cxb8=R are stalemate, 5.cxb8=N leaves a drawn two knights endgame, and 5.Nb3+ Rxb3+ 6.Kc2 Rb2+! 7.Kc1 (7.Kc3?? Kb1! and Black wins) only draws after 7...Rb1+ or 7...Rb4 8.c8=Q (8.c8=R Ra4 is safe now) Rc4+. White can only win by 5.cxb8=B! followed by a bishop and knight checkmate.

== See also ==
- Plaskett's Puzzle, another endgame problem involving underpromotion
