= Domination (chess) =

In chess, and particularly in endgame studies, domination occurs when a player controls all movement squares of an enemy piece.

== Examples ==
Beliavsky vs. Korchnoi, 2004

Position: g8 black king, a7 black pawn, f7 black pawn, g7 black pawn, h6 black pawn, c5 black pawn, c4 white knight, h4 white pawn, a3 white pawn, c3 black bishop, e3 white pawn, g3 white pawn, f2 white pawn, g2 white queen, d1 black queen, g1 white king

The position after 37...Qd1+. White blundered with 38.Kh2?

This position occurred in the game Beliavsky–Korchnoi, György Marx Memorial, 2004. White blundered with 38.Kh2? allowing 38...Qd3 – this dominates the knight: despite having six squares available to it, its capture cannot be avoided. b2, d2, a5 and e5 are guarded by the black bishop, d6 by the black queen, and b6 by the pawn. Additionally, there is no way for the white queen to safely defend it, as every square she could defend it from is guarded by the black queen.

Henri Rinck, La Stratégie 1920

Position: c7 white knight, e4 black rook, f4 black king, f2 white king, b1 white knight, d1 white bishop

White to play and win

The example here is a study by Henri Rinck first published in La Stratégie in 1920. It is White to play and win. Normally, Black would be able to sacrifice his rook for the white bishop, leaving a drawn position (sacrificing it for a knight would be no good, since it is possible to force mate with bishop and knight), but in this case it turns out that the rook is dominated, and its capture cannot be avoided despite its freedom of movement. The first move of the solution is 1.Nd2, after which all rook moves allow it to be captured or immediately lost to a knight fork (1...Re7 2.Nd5+; 1...Re3 2.Nd5+; 1...Rd4 2.Ne6+; 1...Rb4 2.Nd5+) apart from one: 1...Re5. After 2.Nc4 the situation is similar: only 2...Re4 and 2...Rf5 avoid immediate loss of the rook. Whichever Black plays, White continues with 3.Nd6 when only 3...Re5 avoids immediate loss. 4.Bf3 leaves Black completely helpless: once again, all moves allow capture of the rook or a knight fork except 4...Ra5, when after 5.Ne6+ Ke5 6.Nc4+ the rook is finally won. At all stages the rook had wide freedom of movement, and twice it had the maximum number of fourteen squares available to it, yet it could not be saved; it was dominated.
