= Ernest Pogosyants =

Ernest Levonovich Pogosyants (June 5, 1935, Chuhuiv – August 16, 1990) was a Soviet-Armenian composer of chess problems and endgame studies. He composed about 6,000 problems and studies, almost as many chess puzzles as the 6,500 created by T. R. Dawson. In 1988 he was awarded the title Grandmaster for Chess Compositions.

Harold van der Heijden included 1,727 studies by Pogosyants in his endgame study database. This represented the largest number of studies by any one composer. Henri Rinck, Alexey Troitsky, and Ladislav Prokes were the only other composers with more than 1,000 endgame studies.
