= James Plaskett =

English chess grandmaster and writer (born 1960)

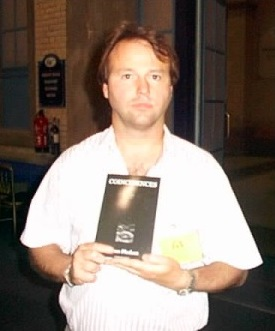

Personal information
- Born: Harold James Plaskett; 18 March 1960 (age 66) Dhekelia, Cyprus

Chess career
- Country: England
- Title: Grandmaster (1985)
- Peak rating: 2529 (July 2000)

Harold James Plaskett (born 18 March 1960) is a British chess grandmaster and writer.

== Biography ==
=== Early life and personal life ===
Plaskett was born in Dhekelia, Cyprus, on 18 March 1960 and was educated at Bedford Modern School, England. In the 1990s he was a chess columnist for the New Statesman while working various jobs in London. He is married to the poet Fiona Pitt-Kethley. They relocated to Cartagena, Spain in 2002.

=== Chess career ===
At the European Junior Chess Championship 1978/79, which was won by John van der Wiel, Plaskett came third with 8 points out of 13 games. At the Junior EC 1979/80 Plaskett reached a shared fourth place with 8.5 points out of 13 games.

Plaskett achieved the title of International Master in 1981, and became an International Grandmaster in 1985. His three GM norms were obtained at the EEC Open in Paris in June 1983 (scoring 8/9 to come first), the 6th Benedictine International in Manchester in September 1983 (scoring 7/9 for first place) and in July 1985 at the Järvenpää International, a 10-player all-play-all invitational event held in Järvenpää, Finland (scoring 7/9 and tying for first place with Hungarian GM István Csom and Swedish IM Axel Ornstein). At the Hastings tournament in 1986/87 he achieved 7 points out of 13 games, one point less than the winner Murray Chandler.

He became British Chess Champion in 1990, with 9 points out of 11 games. In 1998 he played in the 73rd Hastings tournament, which was won by Matthew Sadler; James Plaskett reached fifth place with 4.5/9.

As of 2025 he continues to be active in chess in Spain.

He has written nine chess books.

In 1987, at a top-flight chess tournament in Brussels, he presented an endgame study composed circa 1970 by endgame composer Gijs van Breukelen. As a result, the famous study is now known as Plaskett's Puzzle.

=== Coincidences ===
Plaskett has been recording his own experiences of coincidences since the 1980s. He has said that the coincidences have seemed to proliferate in response to his own study, and have been seemingly interlinked by recurrent themes or motifs, which he felt may be "an indicator of something glimpsed but yet to be clearly seen or understood." He is the author of a semi-autobiographical book, Coincidences and also maintains a blog "Snapshots: A Coincidence Diary".

=== Giant Octopus ===
Another of Plaskett's interests has been the pursuit of the cryptid, the "Giant Octopus". He undertook a three-week expedition in search of it in the waters off the Bermudan coast in August 1999, in collaboration with Cliff Stanford of Demon Internet.

=== Who Wants To Be A Millionaire? ===
After appearing four times at the qualifying stage of Who Wants to Be a Millionaire?, Plaskett, who had arrived with fellow grandmaster and friend Stuart Conquest, got into the hot seat on the show broadcast on 21 January 2006. After becoming the seventh person to reach £125,000 without using any lifelines, he went on to win £250,000.

He has been public in his defence of contestants Charles Ingram, Diana Ingram, and Tecwen Whittock, who were found guilty of cheating to win the £1 million top prize by means of cough signals. Plaskett told journalist Jon Ronson that the alleged cough signals were simply nervous, responsive coughing caused by unconscious triggers, and that they had also occurred during the legitimate win by Judith Keppel. In 2015, Plaskett and journalist Bob Woffinden collaborated on a book asserting that the Ingrams were innocent. The book, titled Bad Show: The Quiz, The Cough, The Millionaire Major, was published in January 2015. Plaskett's book on the Ingram affair inspired a stage play by James Graham, called Quiz. That later spawned a three part TV Drama of the same name directed by Sir Stephen Frears.

== Bibliography ==
- Plaskett, James; Keene, Raymond; Tisdall, Jon (1987). The English Defence. Batsford. ISBN 978-0-7134-1322-9.
- Plaskett, James (1988). Playing to Win. Rowman Littlefield. ISBN 978-0-7134-5844-2.
- Plaskett, James (1997). The Sicilian Taimanov. Everyman Chess. ISBN 978-1-901259-01-8.
- Plaskett, James (2000). Sicilian Grand Prix Attack. Everyman Chess. ISBN 978-1-85744-291-5.
- Plaskett, James (2000). Coincidences. Tamworth Press. ISBN 978-0-9509441-6-6.
- Plaskett, James (2002). Can You Be a Tactical Chess Genius?. Everyman Chess. ISBN 978-1-85744-259-5.
- Plaskett, James (2004). The Scandinavian Defence. Batsford. ISBN 0-7134-8911-1.
- Plaskett, James (2004). Starting Out: Attacking Play. Everyman Chess. ISBN 978-1-85744-367-7.
- Plaskett, James (2005). Catastrophe in the Opening. Everyman Chess. ISBN 978-1-85744-390-5.
- Plaskett, James (2005). The Queen's Bishop Attack Revealed. Batsford. ISBN 978-0-7134-8970-5.
- Plaskett, James, Woffinden, Bob (2015) Bad Show. Bojangles Books:ISBN 978-0-9930-7552-0; ebook: ISBN 9780993075537
- Plaskett, James (2021). Bread and the Circus

== See also ==
- John Carpenter
