= Vazha Neidze =

Personal information
- Born: March 8, 1937 Tbilisi, Georgian SSR, Soviet Union
- Died: February 10, 2020 (aged 82) Tbilisi, Georgia
- Occupation(s): Geographer, Chess composer

Chess career
- Title: International Master (1989)

Vazha Neidze (Georgian: ვაჟა ნეიძე; March 8, 1937 – 10 February 2020) was a prominent Georgian geographer and chess composer (specifically an estudist). Professionally, he was a leading specialist at the Vakhushti Bagrationi Institute of Geography of the Georgian Academy of Sciences. A Doctor of Sciences, he authored numerous scientific works and school textbooks. In the world of chess, he held the titles of Master (1987) and International Master of Chess Composition (1989), as well as International Arbiter (1980).

== Chess composition ==
Vazha Neidze was a regular participant in the Soviet Union Chess Composition Championships. He achieved significant success in the 17th Championship (1983–1984), where he became the national champion. His studies were frequently published in the FIDE Album. Following the release of a subsequent album in 1989, he was awarded the title of International Master of Chess Composition.

While Neidze's creative themes were diverse, he was particularly fascinated by endgame studies that concluded with checkmating finishes.

Beyond composing, Neidze was a highly respected chess arbiter. He reviewed materials for over 40 competitions and evaluated more than 10,000 endgame studies. He served as a judge for the FIDE Album (1977–1979) and was later appointed as the director of the endgame study department for the same album (1983–1985). In 1991, he identified the best studies for the 4th World Team Chess Composition Championship. Between 2001 and 2003 and between 2004 and 2006, he served on the judging panel for the World Individual Championships.

For many years, he headed the chess composition departments in various publications, including the Latvian magazine Shakhmaty, the newspaper Lelo, the journal Metsniereba da Teknika, and the almanac Chadraki.

== Selected study ==
Vazha Neidze
Gia Nadareishvili Jubilee, 1983
1st Prize

Position: a8 black rook, b8 black bishop, a7 black king, b7 white pawn, d7 black knight, e7 white king, c6 white pawn, a5 white pawn, d5 white bishop, e2 black pawn

Win (5 + 5)

Solution:

1. c7! Nb6 2. axb6+ Kxb6 3. bxa8=N+! Ka7 4. c8=N+! Ka6! 5. Bc4+ Kb7 6. Bxe2 Kxa8 7. Bf3#

A similar "punishment" follows the capture of the other knight: 6... Kxc8 7. Ba6#
