= Iuri Akobia =

Georgian composer (1937–2014)

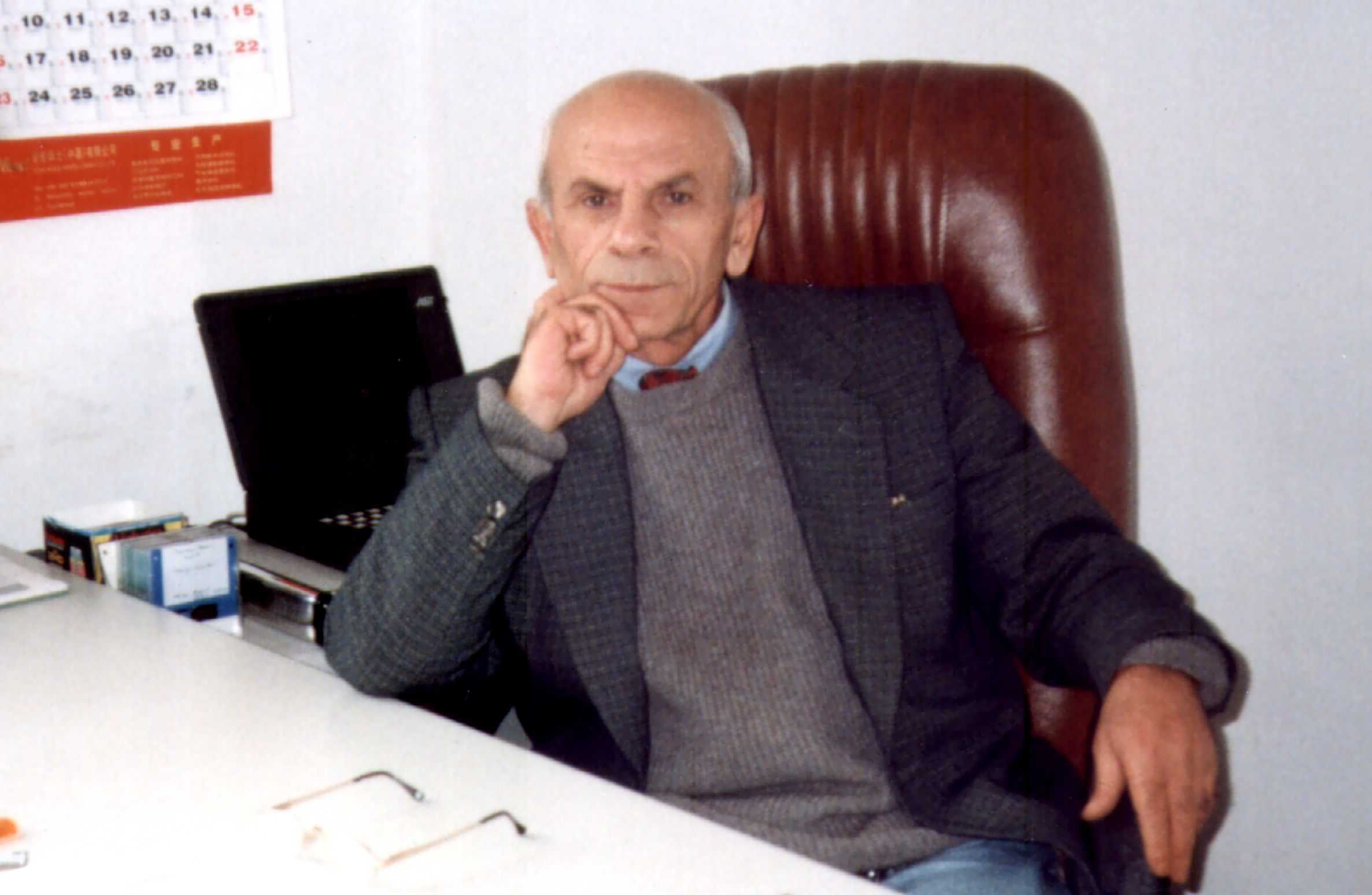
Iuri Akobia

Iuri Akobia (Georgian: იური აკობია, 20 May 1937, Anaklia - 5 November 2014) was a Georgian composer of chess endgame studies and chess problems. For most of his working life he was a radio communications engineer in the National Center for Radio and TV of Georgia, and was Chief Engineer from 1975 until 1996.

His activity as a chess composer began in 1975 when he published his first study. Up to now he has produced about 300 studies (some with his fellow countryman David Gurgenidze) and 50 problems. He won a great many awards and prizes in tourneys of chess composition.

In 1995 he was awarded by the Permanent Commission of the FIDE for Chess Compositions (PCCC) the title of International Judge for Chess Composition.

== Works ==
- Mat v Etiudiakh (Russian) (1990) with Gia Nadareishvili, an anthology of 3660 studies ending with checkmate.
- Three volumes of the "World Anthology of Chess Studies":
  - 4332 Studies with Stalemate (1994)
  - 4492 Studies with mate (1994) with Gia Nadareishvili
  - 4324 Studies with Positional Draw (1995).
- Study Mosaic (1995–2002) - A series of 13 booklets on study composition, with David Gurgenidze.
