= Mark Liburkin =

Soviet chess composer (1910–1953)

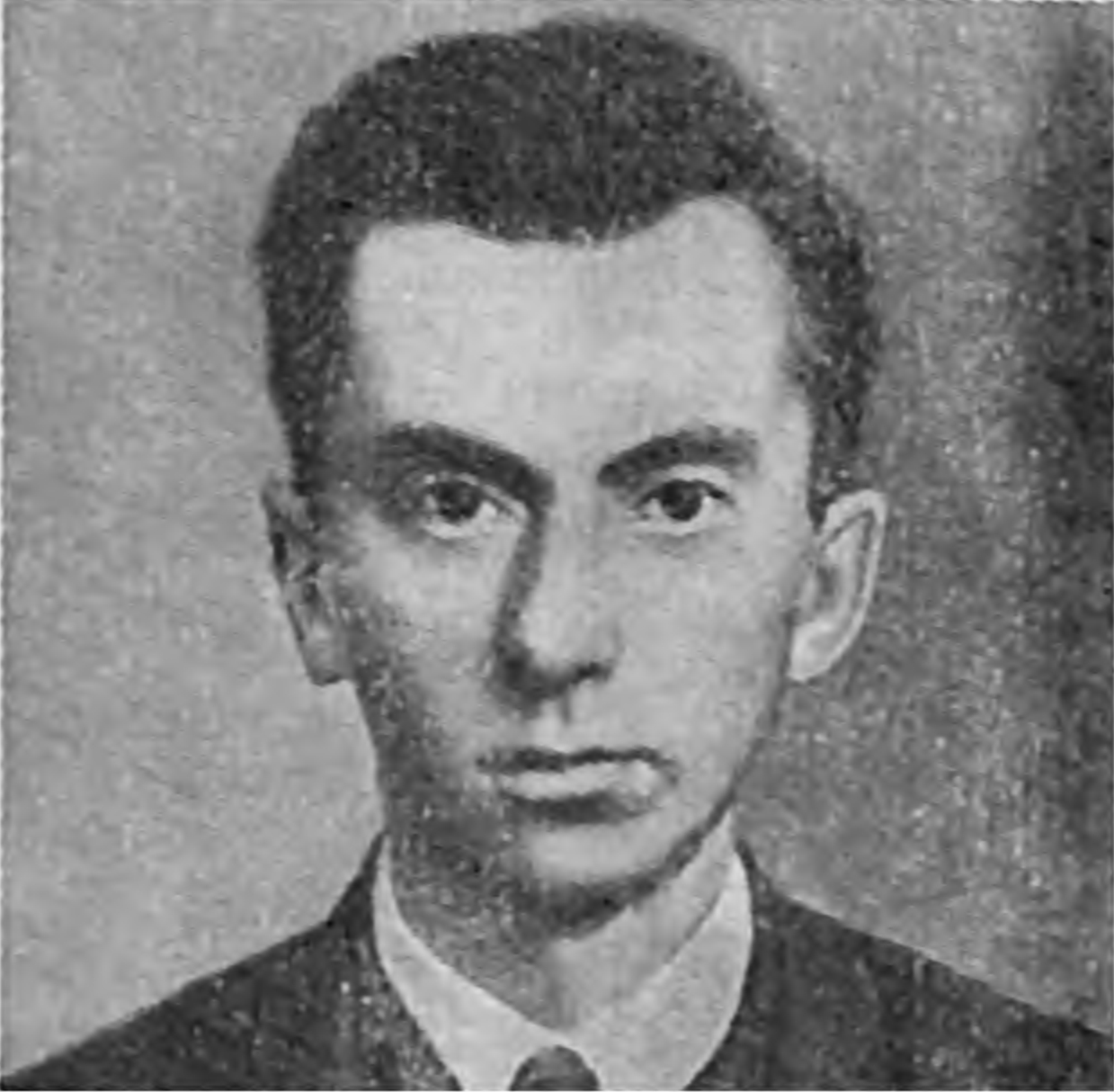
- Born: Mark Savelyevich Liburkin; 31 August 1910; Vitebsk, Russian Empire
- Died: 5 March 1953 (aged 42); Moscow, Soviet Union
- Occupation: Chess composer

Mark Savelyevich Liburkin (Russian: Марк Савельевич Либуркин; 31 August 1910 – 5 March 1953) was a Soviet chess composer. He composed more than 110 endgame studies, usually with geometrical motifs. In 1945, he was appointed editor of Soviet chess magazine Shakhmaty v SSSR. In 2010, endgame association AVRES held centenary memorial tournaments in honor of Liburkin and Shaya Kozlowski.

== Notable compositions ==
Shakhmaty v SSSR, 1939

Position: c8 white knight, a7 black pawn, a6 black queen, c6 black pawn, f6 black pawn, a5 black king, b5 black pawn, d4 white pawn, a3 white pawn, b3 white pawn, e3 white king, f2 white pawn, c1 white bishop

White to play and win

This composition often defeats chess engines, due to their tendency to prune moves that give up material with no immediate gain.

1. Bd2+ b4 2. Bxb4+ Kb5 3. Nd6+ Kb6 4. Ba5+!!

This move sacrifices a piece for no immediate or obvious compensation. Unless they are set up to consider multiple lines, adding considerably to their analysis time, most chess engines will prune this move (eliminate it from serious consideration at the outset), and instead play 4.Bc5+, which will result in a probable draw after 4...Kc7 5.Ne8+ Kd7 6.Nxf6+ Ke6, etc.

4... Kxa5

If 4...Qxa5, then 5.Nc4+ is an easy win for White.

5. Nc4+ Kb5

The pawn ending after 5...Qxc4 6.bxc4 is won for White.

6. Kf4!!

Now Black must attempt to free the queen. If 6...Qb7 or 6...Qc8, then 7.Nd6+.

6... c5 7. d5! f5 8. Kg5!! f4 9. f3

Black is in zugzwang and has no move that does not lead to the loss of the queen, and subsequently the game.
