= Luigi Centurini =

Italian chess player (1820–1900)

Luigi Centurini (Genoa, April 24, 1820 – Genoa, November 10, 1900) was an Italian jurist, chess player, and chess composer.(Zavatarelli 2015:19)

In 1853 he published the pamphlet in Genoa titled Giuoco degli Scacchi (Game of Chess). The endgame of rook and knight against rook was a study that made him known worldwide. In 1865 he wrote a work about the "gambetto grande" (Gambit) that appeared on Eco della Scienza, but his studies especially address the endgame. He collaborated with La Régence and The Chess Monthly in 1856–57. He corresponded with the major chess theorists of his time.

== Sample studies ==
Centurini, 1850

Position: d8 black king, c6 white king, f5 white knight, g4 black rook, e3 white rook

White to move wins; Black to move draws

White to move wins:

- 1. Nd6 Rg8
- 2. Re1 Rf8
- 3. Nb7+ Kc8
- 4. Rb1 Rf3
- 5. Nd6+ Kd8
- 6. Rb8+ Ke7
- 7. Re8+ Kf6
- 8. Rf8+ wins the rook by a skewer after 8...Kf6 9. Rf8+.

Black to move draws by 1...Rg1, with the idea of checking from the first rank (Nunn 2002:156–57).

Centurini was also the primary analyst of the endgame of a bishop and pawn versus a bishop on the same color (Fine & Benko 2003:152). He established rules for when the position is won and when it is a draw (Müller & Lamprecht 2001:108). The position in the second diagram shows a winning position for White, although it requires accurate play (Fine & Benko 2003:155–56).

Centurini, 1856

Position: c8 white king, d8 white bishop, b7 white pawn, c6 black king, h2 black bishop

Centurini showed how White to move wins. White also wins if Black is to move (Müller & Lamprecht 2001:13).
