= Leopold Mitrofanov =

Russian chess player (1932–1992)

Leopold Adamovich Mitrofanov (July 2, 1932 – November 26, 1992) was a Russian chess composer, an International Judge of Chess Composition (awarded 1971) and an International Master of Chess Composition (awarded 1980). He was born in Leningrad (now St. Petersburg) and, by profession, was a chemical engineer.

Beginning in the 1950s, Mitrofanov published over 300 endgame studies, 40 of which were awarded first prizes in competitions. Between 1955 and 1992, he participated in the finals of eight USSR Championships for chess composition. In FIDE competitions, he and Vladimir Korolkov were jointly awarded 3 gold medals. Mitrofanov composed a number of studies jointly with grandmaster Alexander Beliavsky.

In 1967, Mitrofanov's most celebrated chess study was awarded first prize from 250 entries to a tournament commemorating the twelfth-century Georgian poet Shota Rustaveli. Former world champion Mikhail Tal was among the judges. Their report stated that Mitrofanov's entry "doesn't look like any other, and is beyond the rest of the studies." Another judge, composer Alexander Herbstmann, said: "Immediately after the first preview, Mitrofanov's masterpiece created a tremendous impression by the intensity and novelty of the idea. The ranking of the other studies was designated by us beginning with the second place."

== Famous study ==
Unfortunately, Mitrofanov's original study (as below, but with Black's knight on f3 rather than g2) was subsequently found to have a cook, a defense that enabled Black to reach a draw, in some variations by perpetual check. Even after correction, the study remains notable. According to Tim Krabbé, "[i]t would be my candidate for 'study of the millennium'".

Position: a7 black king, a6 white pawn, d6 black bishop, g6 white pawn, a5 white king, b5 white pawn, d5 white pawn, e5 black knight, h5 white pawn, e4 white rook, g2 black knight, h2 black pawn

Mitrofanov, 1967 (corrected).
White to play and win.

Position: a8 black king, b8 black bishop, g8 white queen, a7 white pawn, b6 white pawn, c6 white pawn, a5 white king, h5 black queen, e1 black knight

Position after Black's sixth move.

From the position at above left:

1.b6+
All other moves lose. White has to stop Black from blockading the queenside pawns with 1...Bc7+.
1...Ka8
Allows Black's bishop to interpose on b8 after White queens his g-pawn.
If 1...Kb8, then 2.g7 Kc8 3.g8(Q)+ Kd7 4.Qe6+ Kd8 5.Qxd6+ Ke8 6.Rxe5+ Kf7 7.Qg6+ Kf8 8.Re8#.
2.Re1!
Sacrifices the rook to avoid checks along the first rank from Black's soon-to-be-created queen on h1.
If 2.g7?, then 2...h1(Q) draws; all other 2nd moves lose for White.
2...Nxe1
If 2...Nc4+ then 3.Kb5 (all other White moves lose) Nxe1 (all other moves give White mate in at most 20 moves) 4. g7 and the threat of queening is m/21.
White refutes, with 3.g7, each of 2...Ne3 (m/12), 2...Bb8 (m/11), 2...Nf4 (m/8), 2...Bc7 (m/8), 2...Nh4 (m/8), 2...Kb8 (m/7), 2...Nd7 (m/7), 2...Be7 (m/6) and both minor piece underpromotions (to a bishop (m/7) or knight (m/6)).
If Black promotes to Queen or Rook, 3. Rxh1 is m/11.
2...Nc6+ is refuted by 3.dxc6 (m/8).
2...Bb4+ is most efficiently refuted by 3.Kb5 (m/7).
All remaining Black bishop moves are refuted by 3.Rxe5 (m/3).
All remaining Black knight moves are refuted by 3.Re8+ (2...Nf7 3.Re8+ is m/3; for the others, it is m/2).
3.g7
All other moves allow Black to mate in at most 9 moves.
3...h1(Q)
The most obvious alternative, 3...Nc4+, is objectively better as it pushes mate further away, but represents less of a knife-edge. It is refuted by 4.Kb5 h1(Q) 5.g8(Q)+ Bb8 6.a7 Qh2 (6...Nd6+ 7.Kc6 Qxd5+ 8.Qxd5 m/3) 7.axb8(Q)+ Qxb8 8.Qxb8+ Kxb8 9.Kxc4 m/15.
3...Bb8 is refuted by 4.a7 (m/7) and not by 4.g8(Q)?? which only draws after 4...Nc4+, where White has nothing better than to accept perpetual check.
All other 3rd Black moves result in mate in at most 6 moves, either by White capturing the checking piece (if 3...Nc6+ or 3...Bb4+) or, in all other cases, by 4.g8(Q)(+).
4.g8(Q)+
All other moves allow Black to mate in at most 9 moves.
4...Bb8
5.a7
All other moves lose, e.g. 5.Qe6? Nc4+ 6.Kb5 (6.Kb4 Nd3+ 7.Kxc4 Ne5+ m/19; 6.Ka4 Nd6 7.b7+ Ka6 8.Qe3+ Kxa6 9.Qe2+ Kxb7 m/13 as White soon runs out of checks) Nd6+ 7.Kc6 Nc2 m/15.
5...Nc6+
Since 5...Qxd5+ is met by 6.Qxd5+ Nc6+ 7.Qxc6#, to postpone being mated, Black must sacrifice the knight in order to enable his queen to give check.
5...Nd7 is refuted by 6.Qe6 Nc5 7.axb8(Q)+ Kxb8 8.Qd6+ Ka8 9.Qd8+ m/2.
6.dxc6
Again demonstrating the knife-edge, the only alternative that does not result in White being mated in a few moves, 6.Kb5, is refuted by 6...Nd3! and Black wins: (a) 7.Kxc6 Ne5+ and the Black Queen enters the fray with decisive effect, soon capturing the White pawns on b6 and a7, and with many lines eventually leading to a Bishop+Knight mate; (b) 7.axb8(Q)+ Nxb8 8.b7+ Ka7 (8...Kxb7? 9.Qh7+ and 10.Qxd3 draws) 9.Qe6 Qb1+ and eventually the White pawns fall.
6...Qxh5+
(see position at above right) The only somewhat plausible alternative, 6...Qh2 to defend the b8 square, falls to 7.axb8(Q)+ Qxb8 8.b7+ Ka7 9.Qg1#

But now what can White play? If 7. Ka4 Qh4+ or 7.Kb4 Qh4+ or 7.Ka6 Qe2+, Black can draw by perpetual check.

7.Qg5!!
Mitrofanov's amazing conception. Having previously sacrificed the rook in order to avoid horizontal checks by Black's queen, White now sacrifices its queen, with the opponent giving check upon the capture, for exactly one reason - to deflect Black's queen (hence, "Mitrofanov's Deflection") and thereby prevent it delivering checks along the diagonal. At first glance, the move looks like a misprint. Upon being shown this move, grandmaster Leonid Yudasin reportedly said: "What?! The queen is given for nothing – and with check!" Victor Charusin, an ICCF International Master and author of the book Mitrofanov's Deflection, called it "a move from another world." Krabbé observed: "White lifts his mating threat, the pin of [the bishop on b8], lets his Queen be captured with check on an unguarded square, remains with a few pawns against Queen, Bishop and Knight – and wins."

If instead White moves the king out of check, Black checks with the knight (if 7.Kb4?) or queen, and the game is drawn.

7...Qxg5+
All other Black moves lead to a mate in at most 4 moves, e.g., 7...Qe8 8.b7+ Kxa7 9.Qc5#
8.Ka6
Threatens 9.b7#. White's other moves lose to 8...Bd6.
8...Bxa7
If instead Black checks and sacrifices the queen, White captures it and the threat of 10.c7 wins in the same way as in the main line. Black's other alternatives are refuted by 9.b7+ or 9.b7#.
9.c7!
(see diagram below) Though Black, with a queen, bishop, and knight against White's two connected passed pawns has an enormous material advantage, it cannot defend against the dual threats of 10.b7# and 10.c8(Q)+. Note that if the Black queen were instead on any other square of the board where it is not already giving check, Black would easily win. Only on g5, to which square White's queen sacrifice has deflected it, does Black have no checks that do not lose the queen.
9...Qa5+
9...Qd5 10.c8(Q)+ Bb8 11.b7+ Qxb7+ 12.Qxb7# and 9...Qg6 10.c8(Q)+ Bb8 11.Qb7# lose even quicker.
10.Kxa5 Kb7
All other Black moves result in mate in two. The paradoxical nature of this problem is highlighted by the fact that Black is now losing because of the two minor pieces. Without the knight, Black draws with 10...Bxb6+ 11.Kxb6 stalemate; without the bishop, Black draws with 10...Kb7 followed by Nd3-e5-d7xb6.
11.bxa7 1-0
One of the pawns will queen; White mates in (at most) 11 more moves.

Position: a8 black king, a7 black bishop, c7 white pawn, a6 white king, b6 white pawn, g5 black queen, e1 black knight

Position after 9.c7!!
White's king and two pawns defeat Black's army.
