= Abram Gurvich =

Russian chess composer

Abram Solomonovich Gurvich (Russian Абра́м Соломо́нович Гу́рвич) was a Russian composer of chess endgame studies. He was born in Baku on February 11, 1897, and worked as a literature and theatre reviewer. His first chess study was published in 1926. Gurvich composed more than 100 endgame studies. He died in Moscow on November 18, 1962. At the end of the 1940s, he was one of the main targets of the so-called campaign against the "rootless cosmopolitans".

== A study by Abram Gurvich ==
Abram Gurvich
Schachmaty 1928

Position: b8 black bishop, b6 white knight, g6 white pawn, h6 black king, a3 white bishop, h3 white king

White to move and win (4 + 2)

Solution:

1. Nb6-d7 Bc7!

(1…Bf4 2. Kg4 and 3. Kf5; if 1… Ba7, then 2. Ne5! Kg7 3. Bb2!)

2. Nd7-f8 Bc7-e5!
3. Kh3-g4! Be5-b2!
4. Ba3-c5! Bb2-d4!
5. g6-g7!! K:g7 (5... B:g7 6. Be3 mate)
6. Nf8-e6+

== Works ==
- Этюды (Chess Studies, Russian), Moscow, 1961.
