= William Norwood Potter =

English chess master and writer (1840–1895)

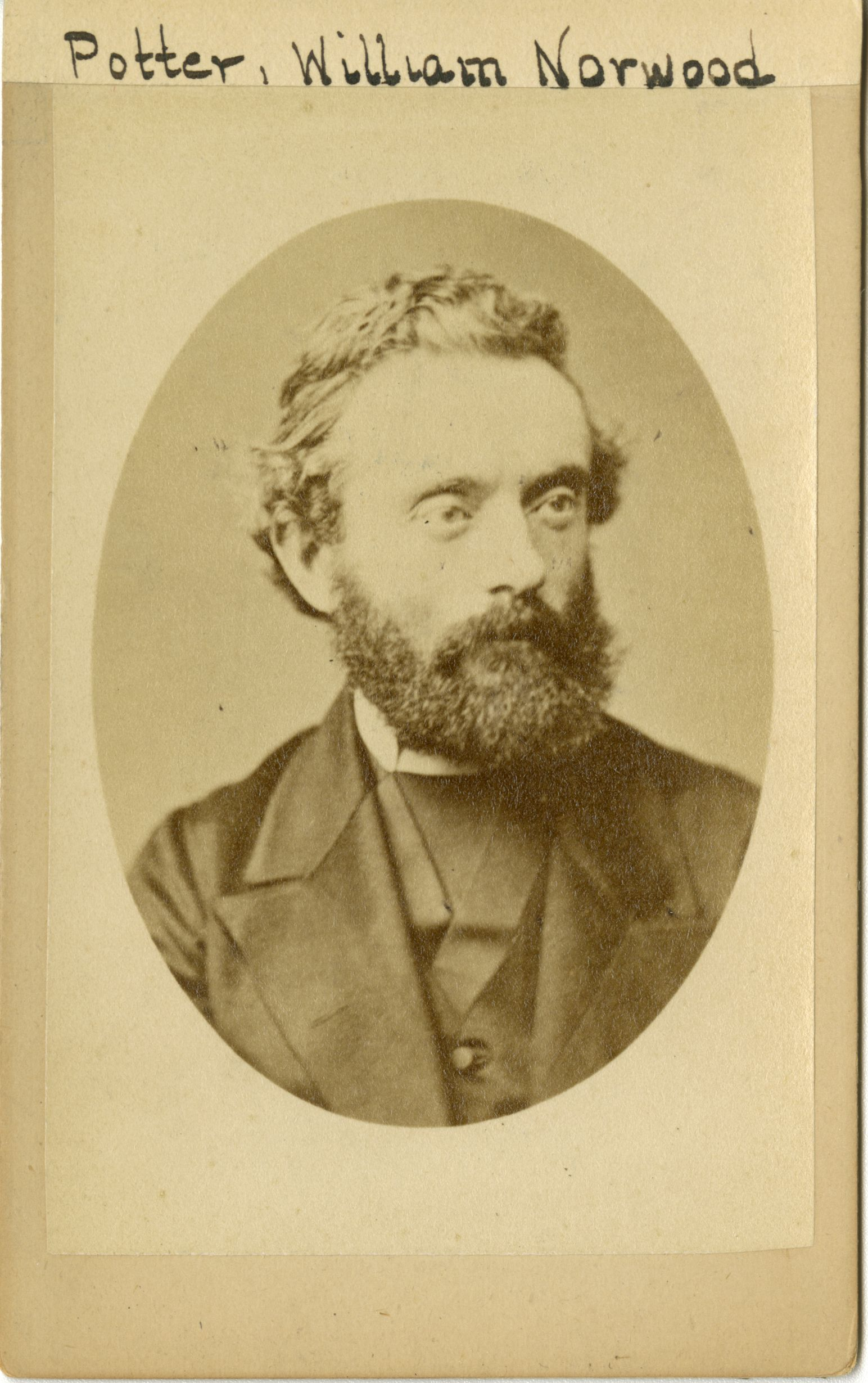
William Norwood Potter

William Norwood Potter (27 August 1840 – 13 March 1895) was an English chess master and writer. He is primarily remembered for the quality of his chess journalism, and for his association with Wilhelm Steinitz, the first winner of a world chess championship match.

== Life and career ==
Potter was born in London on 27 August 1840 to William and Mary Anne (Martin) Potter. He had three brothers and a sister, Mary Potter.

A barristers' clerk by trade, Potter first appeared in London chess circles in 1867 and rose quickly from obscurity, winning the 1870 City of London Chess Club handicap tournament, in which he defeated Joseph Henry Blackburne and Cecil Valentine De Vere on even terms. From 1872 to 1874 the City of London Chess Club contested a two-game correspondence chess match with Vienna: the other London team members eventually dropped out, leaving Potter and Steinitz to continue the match by themselves, which they ultimately won by a score of 1½–½. Steinitz would later point to this match as the beginning of the "systematic analytical development of modern ideas" in chess. In 1875 Potter lost a hard-fought match against Johannes Zukertort, scoring two wins and four losses with eight draws. In 1879 he drew a match against James Mason, both sides scoring five wins apiece with eleven draws.

Potter was a chess columnist for the Westminster Papers from 1868 to 1879. From 1874 to 1876 he produced his own periodical, the City of London Chess Magazine, which featured contributions from Zukertort and Steinitz. Subsequently, he became the last chess editor at Land and Water from 1877 to 1885. He also contributed the well-reviewed article on chess in the ninth edition of Encyclopædia Britannica.

After 1885 Potter retired from the London chess scene. He died in his home in Sutton on 13 March 1895.

== Assessment and legacy ==
In Potter's obituary, the British Chess Magazine noted that though "his record of first-class play is not a long one", "the quality of his best play entitles him, we think, to rank as the equal of any British-born master of his time, with the single exception of Blackburne." Regarding Potter, Steinitz once said: "Put all the pieces into a hat and shake them out on to the board, and you have Potter’s style exactly"; but nevertheless acknowledged him as "a very fine player of the modern school, as well as unquestionably the ablest analyst in England next to Zukertort." Emanuel Lasker claimed in his Manual of Chess that Potter "had influenced Steinitz greatly" but subsequent commentators have cast doubt on this assessment. For his part, Steinitz claimed that Potter "was my pupil direct for some time." Potter's chess writings are praised for their mastery, liveliness and wit.

The Oxford Companion to Chess records two opening variations bearing Potter's name, one in the Scotch Game (1.e4 e5 2.Nf3 Nc6 3.d4 exd4 4.Nxd4 Bc5 5. Nb3) which he introduced in the 1870s and which was revived in the 2000s by Vassily Ivanchuk and Magnus Carlsen, and one in the Compromised Defence to the Evans Gambit (1.e4 e5 2.Nf3 Nc6 3.Bc4 Bc5 4.b4 Bxb4 5.c3 Ba5 6.d4 exd4 7.0-0 dxc3 8.Qb3 Qf6 9.e5 Qg6 10.Nxc3 Nge7 11.Rd1) which he gave in his Land and Water column.

The Saavedra position, one of the best-known endgame studies in chess, originates from a game of Potter's against Richard Fenton in 1875.

== Notable games ==
=== Potter vs. Matthews, London 1868 ===
Potter–Matthews, London 1868

Position: a8 black rook, d8 black queen, e8 black king, f8 black bishop, g8 black knight, h8 black rook, a7 black pawn, b7 black pawn, f7 black pawn, g7 black pawn, h7 black pawn, d6 black pawn, c5 black pawn, e5 black knight, c4 white bishop, g4 black bishop, c3 white pawn, d3 black pawn, f3 white knight, a2 white pawn, b2 white pawn, f2 white pawn, g2 white pawn, h2 white pawn, a1 white rook, b1 white knight, c1 white bishop, d1 white queen, e1 white rook, g1 white king

Position after 8...Nxe5

Position: a8 black rook, d8 black queen, f8 black bishop, g8 black knight, h8 white knight, a7 black pawn, b7 black pawn, f7 black king, g7 black pawn, h7 black pawn, d6 black pawn, f6 black pawn, b5 white bishop, c5 black pawn, g5 white bishop, c3 white pawn, d3 black pawn, a2 white pawn, b2 white pawn, f2 white pawn, g2 white pawn, h2 white pawn, a1 white rook, b1 white knight, d1 black bishop, e1 white rook, g1 white king

Final position after 13.Nxh8#

This frequently published miniature, which features a knight delivering checkmate from a corner of the board, was played between Potter (White) and Matthews (Black) during a "meeting of the British Chess Association" in 1868.

1.e4 e5 2.d4 exd4 3.Bc4 c5 4.Nf3 d6 5.0-0 Nc6 6.c3 d3 7.Re1 Bg4 8.e5! Nxe5? (see diagram) 8.Nxe5! Bxd1 10.Bb5+! Ke7 11.Bg5+! f6 White keeps an extra piece after 11...Ke6 12.Nxd3+ Kf5 13.Bxd8. 12.Ng6+ Kf7 13.Nxh8#

=== Zukertort vs. Potter, London 1876 ===
Zukertort–Potter, London 1876

Position: h2 white pawn, g2 white pawn, f2 white king, a2 white pawn, f3 white queen, f4 black knight, c4 white pawn, b4 white pawn, g5 black pawn, f5 black pawn, d5 white pawn, h6 black pawn, d6 black pawn, c6 white knight, b6 black pawn, h7 black king, f7 black bishop, c7 white knight, e8 black queen

Position after 36.Nxc7

Position: h1 black queen, h2 white pawn, g2 white pawn, f2 white king, a2 white pawn, f4 black knight, c4 white pawn, b4 white pawn, g5 black pawn, d5 white pawn, h6 black pawn, g6 black bishop, d6 black pawn, c6 white knight, b6 black pawn, d7 white queen, c7 white knight, h8 black king

Final position after 40...Kh8

In a difficult position, Potter (Black) finds a remarkable queen manoeuvre to save this game against Zukertort (White) in an 1876 tournament at Simpson's Divan.

1.e3 e5 2.c4 d6 3.Nc3 Nf6 4.d4 Be7 5.Nf3 Nc6 6.Be2 0–0 7.0–0 Bd7 8.d5 Nb8 9.Nd2 Ne8 10.f4 exf4 11.exf4 f5 12.Nf3 g6 13.Bd2 Ng7 14.Qc2 Be8 15.Rae1 Bf7 16.Rf2 Nd7 17.Bd3 Re8 18.Rfe2 Nf8 19.Qb3 Rb8 20.Be3 b6 21.Nd4 Qd7 22.Nc6 Ra8 23.Nb5 Bf6 24.Nbxa7 h6 25.Nb5 Kh7 26.Bd4 Rxe2 27.Rxe2 Bxd4+ 28.Nbxd4 Re8 29.Rxe8 Qxe8 30.Kf2 Nh5 31.Nb5 Nd7 32.Qc2 Nc5 33.b4 Nxd3+ 34.Qxd3 Nxf4 35.Qf3 g5 36.Nxc7 (see diagram) 36...Qh8! Threatening 37...Qb2+. 37.Qb3 Qa1!! 38.Qc2 Qh1!! Forcing White to give perpetual check. 39.Qxf5+ Bg6 40.Qd7+ Kh8 Draw agreed. Avoiding the draw with 41.Qg4? would lose after 41...Nd3+ 42.Ke3 (or 42.Kg3 Qe1+ and wins the queen) Qg1+ 43.Kd2 Qc1+ 44.Ke2 Qe1+ 45.Kf3 Qf2 mate.

=== Potter vs. Mason, London 1879 ===
Potter–Mason, London 1879

Position: a8 black rook, d8 black queen, f8 black rook, g8 black king, a7 black pawn, b7 black pawn, d7 black knight, f7 black pawn, g7 black pawn, c6 black pawn, d6 black bishop, f6 black knight, h6 black pawn, c4 white bishop, d4 white pawn, g4 black bishop, e3 white bishop, f3 white knight, a2 white pawn, b2 white pawn, c2 white queen, d2 white knight, f2 white pawn, g2 white pawn, h2 white pawn, a1 white rook, f1 white rook, g1 white king

Position after 13...Nbd7

Position: a8 black rook, f8 black rook, h8 black king, a7 black pawn, b7 black pawn, f7 black pawn, h7 white bishop, c6 black pawn, f6 white rook, h6 white queen, a5 black queen, d5 black knight, g5 white knight, d4 white pawn, e3 white pawn, a2 white pawn, b2 white pawn, g2 white pawn, h2 white pawn, g1 white king

Final position after 24.Rxf6

This fine sacrificial attack by Potter (White) against Mason (Black) from their 1879 match was annotated by Steinitz in The Modern Chess Instructor, from which the following quotes are taken.

1.e4 e5 2.Nf3 Nf6 3.Nxe5 d6 4.Nf3 Nxe4 5.d4 d5 6.Bd3 Bd6 7.0-0 0-0 8.c4 c6 9.Qc2 Nf6 10.Bg5 h6 11.Be3 dxc4 12.Bxc4 Bg4 13.Nbd2 Nbd7? (see diagram) 14.Bxh6! "Sound and brilliant." 14...Bxf3 15.Nxf3 gxh6 16.Qg6+ Kh8 17.Qxh6+ Kg8 18.Rae1! "An important move for the attack and one of great depth and insight into the game." 18...Nb6 19.Bd3 Nbd5 20.Ng5 Bf4 21.Re3! "An exceedingly beautiful coup which wins by force." 21...Bxe3 "If for instance 20...Nxe3 21.fxe3 Bxe3+ 22.Kh1 Bxg5 23.Qxg5+ Kh8 24.Rxf6 and wins. Of course, if 21...Bxg5 22.Rg3 and wins." 22.fxe3 Qa5 23.Bh7+ Kh8 24.Rxf6 Black resigned "for if after 24...Qe1+ 25.Rf1 Qxe3+ 26.Kh1 Black must give up the queen for knight and his game is then hopeless."
