= Charles Bent (chess composer) =

English composer of chess endgame studies

Charles Michael Bent was an English composer of chess endgame studies. He was born in Newbury, Berkshire on 27 November 1919 and died on 28 December 2004. Bent was the most prolific English endgame composer and one of the top ten in the world. He published as many as 848 studies, winning seven first prizes and 72 honours in international competitions.

Beginning in 1975, he edited the British Chess Magazine monthly study column for ten years and contributed several articles to the EG quarterly study magazine. In 1993, together with Timothy Whitworth, he published a selection of 288 of his best endgame studies, entitled The Best of Bent.

Bent received several awards in his lifetime. He was awarded the British Chess Federation President's Award, in recognition of his achievements in chess composition. The C. M. Bent Memorial Composing Tourney was held in 2006–07.

== Articles by C. M. Bent ==
- "Symmetry". EG vol. 4, 1966.
- "Some Aspects of Composing". EG vol. 12, 1968.
- "Towards Perfection". EG vol. 18, 1969.
- " 'All Right Then, So Black Makes a Queen...' ". EG vol. 21, 1970.
- "Workshop". EG vol. 25, 1971.
- "Mike Bent" BESN vol. 10 issue 1, 2005
