= Ignazio Calvi =

Italian chess player (1797–1872)

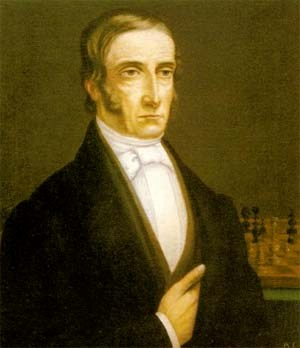
Ignazio Calvi, ca. 1860

Ignazio Calvi (Reggio Emilia, 21 January 1797 — Finale Emilia, 17 August 1872) was an Italian patriot and chess player.

After taking part to a popular insurrection in Modena and participating to a military campaign of the Savoy army, he was forced to expatriate. He moved to Paris in 1834, remaining there for 14 years. In the famous Café de la Régence he played many games with the foremost French players, being recognized as a strong master. In 1845 he drew a match with Lionel Kieseritzky (+7 –7 =1).

He contributed many articles to the chess review Le Palamède, among them a Cours d'échecs, which was later translated into English on the Chess Player's Chronicle. The articles included many diagrams with exercises and endgame studies, most of them composed by himself. He is regarded as the first composer to treat with some depth the theme of underpromotion.

In 1848 he returned to Italy and enlisted in the Piedmont army, taking part in many military campaigns for the cause of Italian unification. In December 1849 he played a series of matches in Modena against the strongest local players, winning most of them: Francesco Discart (+10 –5 =2), Carlo Bonetti (+8 –8 = 4), Francesco Luppi (+4 -0 =0), Marchisio (+2 -0 =0).

In 1859 he was appointed to command the Florence stronghold of the Piedmont army and afterwards he was sent to Parma as an aid to the army general Zucchi. In August of the same year he was named a deputy-member of the newly formed Modena government. He was appointed a representative of the Modena government at first in Parma and then in Ferrara. After serving as an officer in the lawcourt of Naples, he was discharged from the army with the rank of major. He settled in Finale Modenese (now Finale Emilia), where he worked as a pharmacist and was appointed to many public offices.

== An endgame study by Ignazio Calvi ==
Le Palaméde, 1846

Position: g7 white pawn, h7 white pawn, d6 white pawn, e6 black knight, g5 black bishop, a3 black king, e3 white pawn, a2 black pawn, a1 white king, d1 white bishop

White to move and win

This chess endgame study is regarded as one of the first using the theme of underpromotion. The original solution was not entirely correct and the Dutch composer De Freijter slightly modified the study, adding the initial promotion to Knight. The main theme remained however unchanged.

Solution:

== Bibliography ==
- Adriano Chicco, Giorgio Porreca: Dizionario enciclopedico degli scacchi, Mursia, Milan 1971.
- Adriano Chicco, Antonio Rosino: Storia degli scacchi in Italia, Marsilio, Venezia 1990
