= Karl Fabel =

Karl Fabel (October 20, 1905 in Hamburg – March 3, 1975 in Egenhofen) was a German chess composer.

Fabel received a doctorate in chemistry and worked as a mathematician and civil judge at the federal office of brands and patents in Munich, of which he was also president.

He is considered one of the most ingenious chess composers and one of the fathers of retrograde analysis, frequently collaborating with Luigi Ceriani in this area. He composed around 1250 problems of all varieties. He studied chess problems of a mathematical nature such as the Eight queens puzzle, the Knight's tour and Shannon's number. He was a director of Die Schwalbe.

White to play and avoid giving mate.

Position: a8 white bishop, g8 white king, h8 white rook, b7 black rook, h7 white bishop, g6 white rook, c5 black bishop, e5 black pawn, g5 black pawn, c4 white pawn, e4 black king, g4 white pawn, b3 black pawn, e3 white pawn, h3 black pawn, b2 white pawn, e2 white pawn, h2 white pawn, d1 white knight, f1 white knight

Click for solution
1. Rc6+ ! (1... Rxh7)
