= Genrikh Kasparyan =

Soviet chess player (1910–1995)

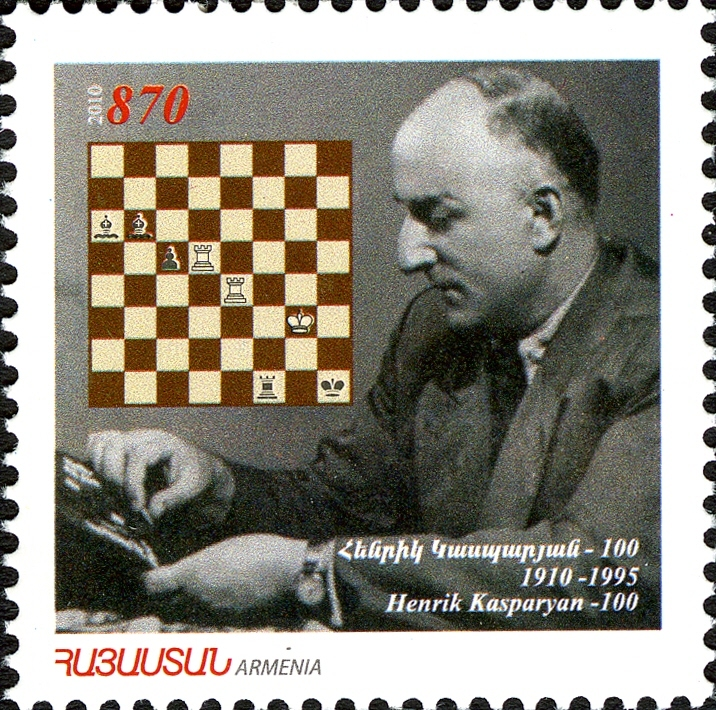
- Kasparyan on a 2010 Armenian stamp

Personal information
- Born: Genrikh Moiseyevich Kasparyan; 27 February 1910 Tbilisi, Georgia, Russian Empire
- Died: 27 December 1995 (aged 85) Yerevan, Armenia

Chess career
- Country: Armenia; Soviet Union; Russian Empire
- Title: International Master (1950); International Judge of Chess Compositions (1956); Grandmaster of Chess Composition (1972)

Genrikh Kasparyan (Note: Armenian: Հենրիկ Գասպարյան, Russian: Генрих Моисеевич Каспарян) (Surname also spelled Kasparian) (27 February 1910 – 27 December 1995) was an Armenian chess player. He is considered to have been one of the greatest composers of chess endgame studies.

Kasparyan became a national master in 1936 and an international master in 1950. He was awarded the titles of International Judge of Chess Compositions in 1956 and International Grandmaster of Chess Composition in 1972, the first composer to receive this title from FIDE (Harkola 2007).

Kasparyan was also a very strong chess player, winning the Armenian championship ten times (from 1934 to 1956, including two ties with future world champion Tigran Petrosian) and the Tiflis championship three times (1931, 1937, 1945). He reached the USSR Championship finals four times (1931, 1937, 1947, 1952), but never finished higher than tenth place.

Kasparyan is best known for his compositions. He started with chess problems, mainly three-movers, but soon discovered that his best field was in endgame studies. He wrote several books and collections and composed about 600 studies, many on the theme of domination, winning 57 first prizes. He won the USSR Composing Championship several times (Sunnucks 1970).

== Sample study ==
Irving Chernev included five of Kasparyan's compositions in his book 200 Brilliant Endgames. This study uses a "model mate" in the middle of the board. (Chernev 1989:103)

Kasparyan, 1955

Position: g7 white knight, a6 white king, d6 black pawn, e6 white bishop, c5 black king, a4 black bishop, d3 white pawn

White to move and win
Solution:
1.Bf5 Kd4 2.Ne6+ Ke5 3.Bh3 Bc2 4.d4+ Kd5 5.Kb5 Bh7 6.Kb4 Bg8 7.Kc3 Bxe6 8.Bg2#

== Most famous combination from practical play ==
Apart from being a prolific composer of chess problems Kasparyan was, as mentioned above, an excellent tournament player. One of his games, Genrikh Kasparyan–Koryun Manvelyan, Armenian Championship, Yerevan 1938, has found its way into countless books on chess tactics:

Kasparyan vs. Manvelyan, 1938

Position: c8 black queen, h8 black rook, c7 black pawn, h7 black pawn, a6 black king, b6 black pawn, c6 black knight, d6 black pawn, g6 black pawn, a5 black pawn, d5 black bishop, a4 white pawn, h4 white queen, b3 white pawn, c3 white rook, f3 white knight, g3 white pawn, c2 white pawn, g2 white bishop, h2 white pawn, c1 white king

Position after 25...Bxd5

1.d4 g6 2.b3 Bg7 3.Bb2 d6 4.e4 f5 5.exf5 Bxf5 6.g3 Nc6 7.Bg2 Qd7 8.f4 0-0-0 9.Nf3 a5 10.Nc3 Nf6 11.Qd2 Ne4 12.Nxe4 Bxe4 13.a4 Rhe8 14.Bc3 b6 15.0-0-0 Kb7 16.Rhe1 Bd5 17.Re2 e5 18.Rde1 exf4 19.Rxe8 Rxe8 20.Qxf4 Ka6 21.Qh4 Rh8 22.Rd1 Qc8 23.Rd3 Be6 24.d5 Bxc3 25.Rxc3 Bxd5 (diagram) 26.Rxc6! Bxc6 27.Qc4+ Kb7 28.Qxc6+!! Kxc6 29.Ne5++ Kc5 30.Nd3+ Kd4 31.Kd2!! 1–0

Black cannot prevent 32.c3#, which will be a pure mate if Black plays any move other than 31...d5 or 31...c5.

== Books ==
- Domination in 2,545 Endgame Studies by Genrikh Kasparyan. ISBN 0-923891-87-0
- The Complete Studies of Genrikh Kasparyan by A. J. Roycroft.
- 888 Miniature Studies by Genrikh Moiseyevich Kasparian. ISBN 978-86-7686-147-7

== Notable games ==
- Vitaly Chekhover vs. Genrikh Kasparian, Erevan, Match 1936, King's Indian Defense: Fianchetto Variation, Classical Fianchetto (E67), 0–1
- Genrikh Kasparian vs. David Bronstein, Ch URS 1947, Sicilian Defense: Grand Prix Attack (B23), 1–0
- Genrikh Kasparian vs. Anatoly Ufimtsev, Ch URS 1947, Reti Opening: Anglo-Slav, Bogoljubow Variation Stonewall Line (A12), 1–0
