= Fiona Pitt-Kethley =

British poet, novelist, travel writer and journalist

Fiona Pitt-Kethley (born 21 November 1954) is a British poet, novelist, travel writer and journalist, who is the author of more than 20 books of poetry and prose. She lived for many years in Hastings, East Sussex and moved to Spain in 2002 with her husband James Plaskett and their son, Alexander.

Her collection of poetry Sky Ray Lolly was published in 1986. She has been described as a poet in "the new tradition of British sexiness in verse that Ewart helped to inaugurate". Pitt-Kethley has also worked as a freelance journalist and has written for The Daily Telegraph, The Independent, The Guardian, The Times, The Big Issue and others.

== Bibliography ==
=== Poetry collections ===
- Sky Ray Lolly (1986)
- Private Parts (1987)
- The Perfect Man (1989)
- Dogs (1993) (Includes two pieces of journalism)
- Double Act (1996)
- Memo From a Muse (1997)
- Selected Poems (2008)

=== Novels ===
- The Misfortunes of Nigel (1991)
- Baker's Dozen (2000)

=== Travel writing ===
- Journeys to the Underworld (1988)
- The Pan Principle (1994)
- Red Light Districts of the World (2000)

=== Collected journalism ===
- Too Hot to Handle (1992)

=== Autobiography ===
- The Autobiography of Fiona Pitt-Kethley: My Schooling (2000)

=== Anthologies as editor ===
- Literary Companion to Sex: an Anthology of Prose and Poetry (1994)
- Literary Companion to Low Life (1995)
