= Edith Baird =

British chess composer (1859–1924)

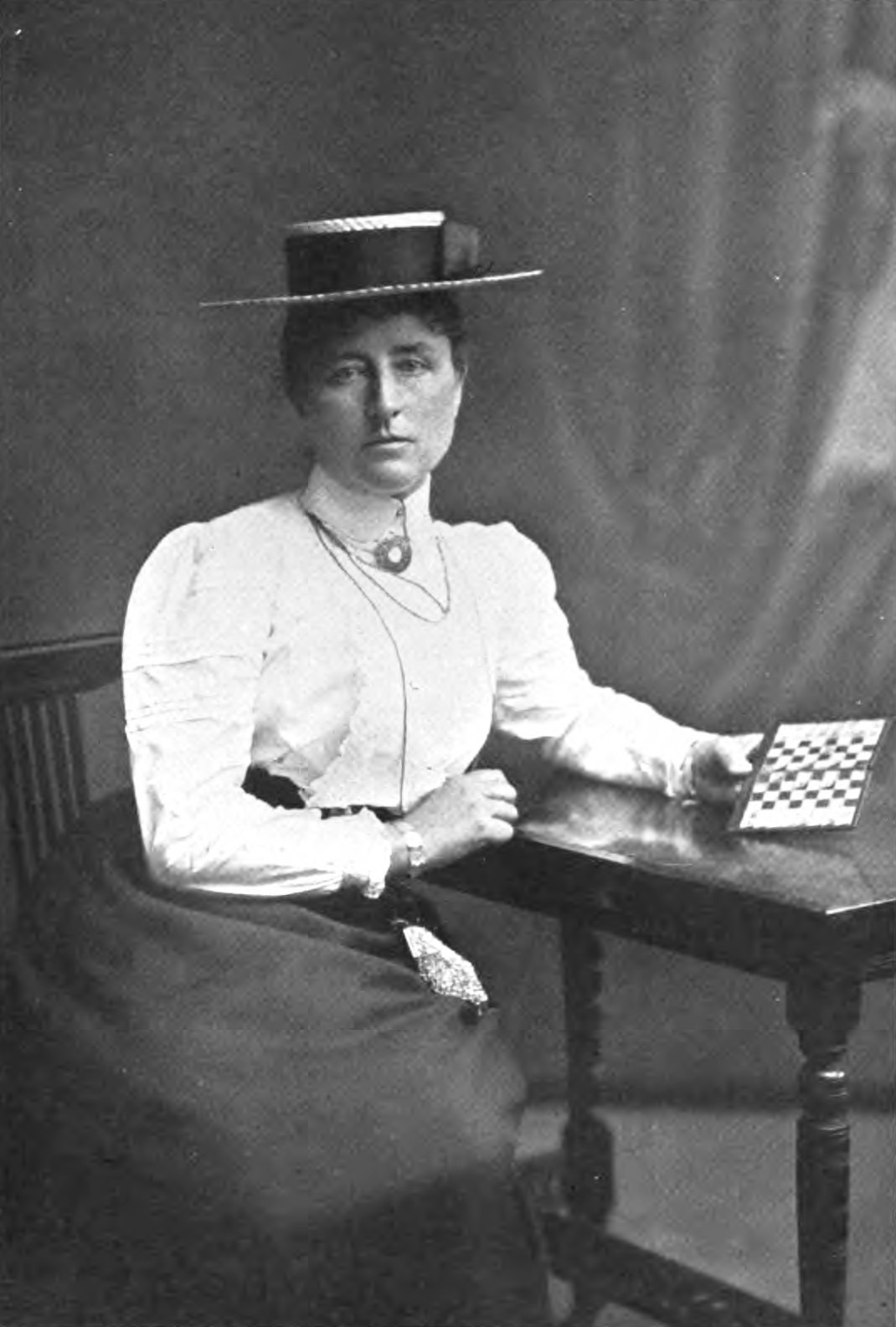
Edith Baird

Edith Elina Helen (Winter-Wood) Baird (22 February 1859 – 1 February 1924) was a British chess composer widely regarded in her time as the world’s most prolific creator of chess problems. She published under her married name as Mrs. W. J. Baird and was sometimes referred to in the press as the "Queen of Chess".

== Early years and family ==
Edith Elina Helen Winter-Wood was born in Boulogne in France, the daughter of Thomas Winter-Wood, a writer, and Eliza Ann (Sole) Winter-Wood. She learned to play chess early in life as her father, her mother, and her older brothers Edward and Carslake were all either amateur or tournament-level chess players.

In 1880 she married William James Baird, Deputy Inspector-General of Hospitals and Fleets for the Royal Navy. They settled in Brighton, where their only child, Lilian Edith, was born. Lilian also went on to become a chess composer.

== Chess composition ==
In the mid 1880s, Baird started composing chess problems and within a few years had gained a reputation in the field. In 1888, she took third prize in a Sheffield chess-composition tournament, the first of over two dozen subsequent prizes. Her most celebrated success came in 1893 when she won an international chess-composition tournament against a number of the most notable chess composers of the day. She became the most prolific composer of chess problems in the world, with over 2000 problems to her credit. These were published in newspapers such as the Times of London. Some of these are still considered sound, many are considered elegant, and some are novelties such as letter problems, in which chess pieces have to form the shapes of letters.

Baird published two books of her problems: Seven Hundred Chess Problems (1902) and The Twentieth Century Retractor (1907). The first book took her 14 years to complete.

As a chess player, Baird won the Sussex Ladies Championship in 1897 and a silver medal in the tournament three times.
