= Emilian Dobrescu =

Romanian economist and chess composer

- Born: 22 May 1933 (age 92); Bucharest, Romania
- Occupations: economist and chess composer
- Known for: First person with the title Grandmaster of the chess compositions from FIDE

Emilian Dobrescu (born 22 May 1933, Bucharest) is a Romanian economist and chess composer.

== Career ==
In addition to serving as a member of the Romanian Academy, an influential academic forum in Romania, Dobrescu has published many books and articles on various topics in the field of economics. One of Dobrescu's recent studies was titled "Macromodels of the Romanian transition economy" and focused on the Romanian economy. It addressed possible economic policies that the Romanian leadership could implement to allow Romania to become more European.

Some scholars point out that the policies he promoted were not always successful and played at least a small role in the failings of the Romanian economy during the 1970s. He served on the State Planning Committee from 1972 until 1982 and held leadership roles on the committee. Dobrescu served as the First Vice-president from 1972 until 1978, and as president from April 1981 until October 1982.

Dobrescu is also a strong chess composer. He is co-author (with Virgil Nestorescu) of the monographs Compoziţia şahistă în România (1973, 312 p.) and Studii de şah (1984, 199 p.). He is the first Romanian to whom FIDE conferred in 1989 the title of Grandmaster of the chess compositions.

Dobrescu lives in Romania.
