= Pietro Rossi (chess composer) =

Italian chess composer (1924–2020)

Pietro Rossi (26 May 1924 – 18 November 2020) was an Italian chess endgame study composer.

Rossi was born in Treviso in May 1924, but lived for most of his life in Matera, where he was a Professor of Social Sciences. Rossi published about 300 studies, 240 of which are contained in Harold van der Heijden's study database. He won more than 90 prizes and awards in international tournaments of study composition.

The Italian Chess Federation (Italian: Federazione Scacchistica Italiana (FSI)) awarded him a gold medal in May 2007 for "high achievements in the field of endgame-study composition".
