= Milan Vukcevich =

Serbian chess player (1937–2003)

- Born: Milan Radoje Vukčević; March 11, 1937; Belgrade, Yugoslavia
- Died: May 10, 2003 (aged 66); Shaker Heights, Ohio, USA
- Scientific career
- Fields: Chemistry
- Workplaces: Case Western Reserve University

Milan R. Vukcevich (born Milan Radoje Vukčević; March 11, 1937 – May 10, 2003) was a Serbian-American chemist, a grandmaster of chess problem composition and writer.

== Biography ==
Milan Radoje Vukčević was born in Belgrade. In 1955 he won the Yugoslav junior championship, drawing a six-game match with Bent Larsen in the same year. In 1960, he played for Yugoslavia at the Chess Olympiad in Leipzig and had the second-best overall score at the Student Chess Olympiad in Leningrad. In 1963 he moved to the US, settling in Ohio, and westernising his surname.

Vukcevich decided on a career in science rather than chess, and in the year he moved to the United States he entered MIT. He was an instructor at Case Western Reserve University for six years before leaving to work for General Electric, where, from 1989, he served as Chief Scientist. He published two books on science.

Vukcevich continued to play chess. In 1969 he was joint winner of the U.S. Open Chess Championship, along with Pal Benko and Robert Byrne. In 1975 he finished third in the U.S. Championship, ahead of Samuel Reshevsky, Robert Byrne, Larry Evans and Arthur Bisguier among others. From 1976 to 1979, he played in the National Telephone League, scoring 16.5 from 22 games, including wins against Bisguier, Yasser Seirawan, Nick De Firmian and Leonid Shamkovich.

Vukcevich died in 2003 in Shaker Heights, Ohio and is buried in Evergreen Hill Cemetery in Chagrin Falls.

His son, Marko, is a former guitar player in the band Mushroomhead from Cleveland. The "Vukcevich Super Cup" was created in his honor soon after his death.

== Chess compositions ==
Vukcevich is better known as an author of chess problems than as a player, however, being the first American resident to be awarded the title of International Composition Grandmaster by FIDE. In 1981 he published Chess by Milan: Problems and Games of Dr. Milan R. Vukcevich and in 1998 was inducted into the US Chess Hall of Fame, becoming only the second person (after Sam Loyd) to be primarily inducted for their achievements in problem composition.

Vukcevich's compositions were gathered together in My Chess Compositions (2003). He composed in all genres, including direct mates, selfmates, helpmates, problems with fairy pieces and a small number of endgame studies.

Milan Vukcevich
1st Prize, The Problemist, 1981

Position: c7 white bishop, e7 black pawn, f7 black rook, g7 black knight, h7 black queen, e6 black pawn, h6 black pawn, e4 white queen, c3 white knight, e3 white pawn, f3 white bishop, g3 white rook, b2 black knight, d2 white pawn, e2 white knight, f2 black king, g2 white pawn, a1 black bishop, b1 white king, h1 white rook

Mate in three moves

On the left is one of Vukcevich's famous problems. The key is 1. Bb6 with the threat 2. Qg6! and 3. Ne4# and 3. e4#. If 2. ... Rxf3 then 3. Rxf3#, which explains the choice of the key. In the main variations Black unpins the Queen, which can then form new batteries: 1. ... Rf5 2. Qf4!! (threat 3. Ne4#) Re5+ 3. Be4#; 2. ... Rxf4+ e4#. 1. ... Nf5! 2. Qh4!! (threat 3. Ne4#) Nxe3+ Rg6#; 2. ... Nxh4+ 3. e4#. Additional variation occurs after 1. ... e5 2. Qf5! Qxf5+ 3. e4#.
