= Plaskett's Puzzle =

Chess endgame study

Plaskett's Puzzle
Gijs van Breukelen, 1970

Position: d7 white pawn, h7 black king, a6 black knight, d6 white king, h6 black pawn, c5 black pawn, g5 black knight, b4 black bishop, g4 white knight, c3 black pawn, e3 black pawn, g3 white pawn, d1 white bishop

White to play and win

FEN: 8/3P3k/n2K3p/2p3n1/1b4N1/2p1p1P1/8/3B4 w - - 0 1

Plaskett's Puzzle is a chess endgame study created by the Dutch endgame composer Gijs van Breukelen (February 27, 1946 – December 21, 2022) around 1970, although not published at the time. Van Breukelen published the puzzle in 1990 in the Netherlands chess magazine Schakend Nederland. It was presented by English grandmaster James Plaskett, at a top-flight chess tournament in Brussels in 1987, hence the name "Plaskett's Puzzle". According to contemporary accounts, of the several strong grandmasters who analyzed the position, only former World Champion Mikhail Tal was able to solve it.

While the solution is striking, the study was found to be flawed in that White has no immediately decisive continuation if Black plays 4...Kg4 rather than the obvious 4...Nf7+. This issue may be fixed by instead placing Black's g5 knight on h8 or e5, or by adding a white pawn on h2, but the flawed version of the study demonstrated by Plaskett and published by van Breukelen remains the best known.

== Solution ==
1.Nf6+ Kg7

If 1...Kg6 2.Bh5+ followed by 3.d8=Q, as the bishop now covers the forking square f7.

2.Nh5+ Kg6

If 2...Kf7 3.d8=Q wins; if 2...Kh7 3.Bc2+ forces the king on to the back rank, allowing d8=Q+ and mate in a few moves.

3.Bc2+!!

This move is difficult for chess engines to find.

3...Kxh5 4.d8=Q! Nf7+

The obvious move, and the intent of the composer; however, 4...Kg4 puts up much stiffer resistance. (5.Qf6 wins, according to Ehn and Kastner, but the win is not intuitively clear). If the problem is set with the knight on h8, then 4...Kg4 can be met by 5.Qh4+ with mate soon to follow.

Roberto Balzan suggests an alternative way to repair the study, by adding a white pawn on h2 in the initial position; then 4...Kg4 can be met with 5.Qf6! Kh3 6.Qxh6+ Kg2 7.Qxg5 and White wins easily.

5.Ke6 Nxd8+ 6.Kf5

White threatens Bd1+. There now follows a remarkable zigzag manoeuvre by the bishop, Black defending against the mating threats by twice underpromoting to a knight to cover the mating square, until there is no further defence.

6...e2 7.Be4 e1=N 8.Bd5 c2 9.Bc4 c1=N 10.Bb5 Nc7

Black can delay the inevitable mate by one move by 10...Nc6.

11.Ba4 1–0

Mate in 3 by Bd1 cannot be prevented, for example 11...Ne2 12.Bd1 Nf3 13.Bxe2 and 14.Bxf3# or 11...Nb3 12.Bxb3 Nc2 13.Bxc2 and 14.Bd1#.
