= Ladislav Prokeš =

Czech chess player (1884–1966)

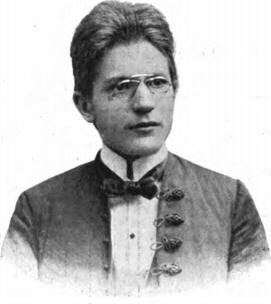
Ladislav Prokeš

Ladislav Prokeš (7 June 1884 – 9 January 1966) was a Czech chess master and one of the most prolific composers of endgame studies in chess. He was born and died in Prague.

Prokeš was joint Czech Champion in 1921 and played for the Czech Olympiad team in 1927, 1928, and 1930. While a strong tournament player, it is his chess compositions that gained him fame. In 1951 he published a collection of studies "Kniha šachových studií". His 1,244 endgame studies, as listed in Harold van der Heijden's database, rank fourth among all composers.

== Prokeš maneuver ==
L. Prokeš, 1939

Position: h5 white king, c4 black king, d3 black pawn, e3 black pawn, f1 white rook

White to move and draw

The Prokeš maneuver is a tactic in chess that enables a rook to draw against two advanced pawns in a chess endgame. Prokeš composed an endgame study in 1939 which illustrated the Prokeš maneuver for the first time. The solution begins:

1. Kg4 e2
2. Rc1+ Kd4
3. Kf3 d2

and Black threatens to promote a pawn, which would win. But White forces the draw with:

4. Rc4+! Kd3
5. Rd4+! Kxd4
6. Kxe2 Kc3
7. Kd1 Kd3 stalemate

The idea is, that by vacating the c1-square on the fourth move, White's rook prevents Black's pawn from capturing on c1. The white king is then able to reach the d1-square, stopping the pawn. The position after 6.Kxe2 is drawn (see King and pawn versus king endgame).
