= Vladimir Bron =

Soviet chess master (1909–1985)

Vladimir Akimovich Bron (14 September 1909, Mykolaiv – 1985, Sverdlovsk, USSR) was a Soviet chess master and problemist.

Born into a Jewish family in Nikolaev (currently Mykolaiv), near Kherson, he was one of the leading scientists of the refractory materials industry. Professor Bron also actively participated in the Sverdlovsk Chess Federation.

He was a top Soviet composer of chess studies. In 1969 he wrote Selected Studies and Problems. He won 31 first prizes in composing tourneys.

Dr. Bron was awarded the International Master title for chess composition in 1966 and the Grandmaster Composer title in 1975.
