= David Gurgenidze =

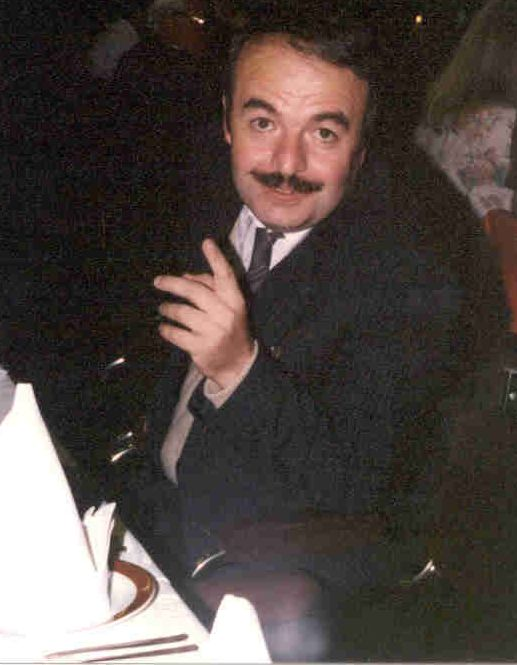
- Gurgenidze in Bratislava, 1993

Personal information
- Born: David Antonis-dze Gurgenidze; September 26, 1953 (age 73) Chailuri, Sagarejo Municipality, Georgian SSR
- Education: Georgian Technical University
- Occupations: Chess composer, endgame study composer, author

Chess career
- Country: Georgia
- Title: Grandmaster for Chess Composition (1989); International Arbiter (1994)

David Gurgenidze (Georgian: დავით გურგენიძე; born September 26, 1953) is a Georgian chess composer and endgame study theorist. He holds the title of Grandmaster for Chess Composition (1989) and is a two-time World Champion in endgame study composition (1997–2000, 2001–2003).

== Biography ==
David Gurgenidze was born in the village of Chailuri, in present-day Sagarejo Municipality. His early interest in chess was influenced by the Georgian grandmaster Bukhuti Gurgenidze, with whom he later developed a close friendship.

In 1964, his mother purchased Gia Nadareishvili’s book Chess Studies, which sparked his lifelong interest in chess composition. He studied at the Chess Circle of the Tbilisi Pioneers Palace under the guidance of Roman Dzindzichashvili and Shota Intskirveli. His first endgame study was published in 1968 in the Riga-based magazine Shakhmaty.

Gurgenidze graduated from the Georgian Technical University (then the Georgian Polytechnic Institute) in 1975.

== Chess career ==
By the late 1980s, Gurgenidze had published several hundred endgame studies and had established himself as one of the leading figures in endgame study composition.

- Chess composition: He has won over 100 first prizes in international endgame study competitions and was awarded the title of International Master for Chess Composition in 1980, followed by the grandmaster title in 1989.
- World Championships: He won the World Championship in Endgame Study Composition twice (1997–2000 and 2001–2003) and later earned bronze medals in 2005 and 2007.
- Soviet championships: He became the USSR Champion in endgame study composition in 1981 and 1985.
- Chess administration: Gurgenidze served as vice-president of the Georgian Chess Federation from 1994 to 2004 and has chaired the Georgian Chess Composition Commission since 1991.
- Team captaincy: He was captain of the Georgian women's national team at the 2000 Chess Olympiad, where the team won the silver medal.

== Publications ==
Gurgenidze is the author of numerous books on chess composition, endgame theory, and chess history.

In 2025, he published 1001 Chess Fairy Tales, a bilingual Russian–English collection of his endgame studies.

== Example study ==
David Gurgenidze, 1970

Position: e7 black king, h7 white knight, h6 black pawn, b5 black pawn, a2 white king

Draw

One of Gurgenidze's early endgame studies demonstrates precise coordination between knight and king to secure a draw in a seemingly lost position. The study has been praised for its originality and economy of means.

Solution: 1. Ka3!!
The knight is trapped, so the loss of even a single tempo would be pointless: 1. Kb2? Kf7 2. Kc3 Kg7 3. Kb4 Kh7 4. Kb5 h5, and the White king fails to enter the pawn’s square. Why 1. Kb3? is impossible will become clear shortly. 1... Ke6
Now after 1... Kf7 everything is fine: 2. Kb4 Kg7 3. Kb5 Kh7 4. Kc4 and the position is drawn. 2. Nf8+! Kf5
3. Nd7 h5
4. Nc5 h4
5. Nb3!
This explains why 1. Ka3 was preferred to 1. Kb3: the b3-square had to remain free. 5... h3
6. Kd2 h2
7. Kf1! h1=Q
8. Ng3+
and the long journey across the board comes to a happy end (the study is given with commentary by Anatoly Kuznetsov).

Boris Spassky commented on the study: “It is staggering—simply beautiful! The knight and the pawns are wonderful. To survive, White must leave the b3-square for the knight. A stunning march.”

== Awards ==
- Order of Honor (Georgia) (1997)
- USSR Master of Sport (1979)
- International Arbiter (1994)

== Selected works ==
- Gurgenidze, David (2025). 1001 Chess Fairy Tales (Bilingual ed.). Tbilisi. ISBN 978-9941-8-7795-7.
- Gurgenidze, David (2004). Study the Endgame (Part I). Tbilisi: Ganatlebuli Sakartvelo. ISBN 99940-782-1-6.
- Gurgenidze, David (2013). Andria Dadiani: From Slander to Truth. Tbilisi: Sakartvelo. ISBN 978-9941-1-6357-9.
- Gurgenidze, David (2011). Georgian Chess: 1877–2010. Tbilisi. ISBN 978-9941-1-6158-2.
- Gurgenidze, David (2021). Vazha Neidze's Bouquet of Checkmates. Tbilisi. ISBN 978-9941-8-3541-4.
- Gurgenidze, David (2022). Chess Problems from the Caucasus: Heinrich Zisserman (1830–1907). Tbilisi. ISBN 978-9941-8-4205-4.
