= John Roycroft =

British chess composer

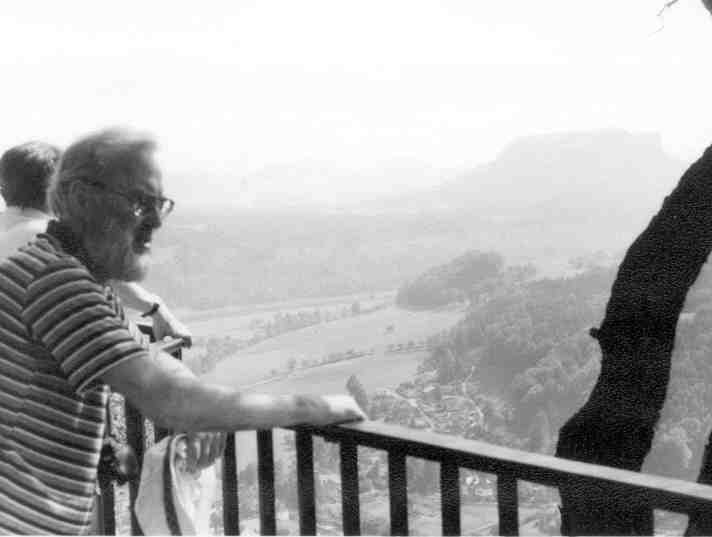
- John Roycroft in 1988 on a trip of a chess symposium in the Elbsandsteingebirge (Saxon Switzerland)

Personal information
- Full name: Arthur John Roycroft
- Born: 25 July 1929 (age 97) London, England

Chess career
- Country: England
- Title: International Judge of Chess Compositions

Arthur John Roycroft (born 25 July 1929, London) is an English chess endgame study composer and author.

== Chess career ==
In 1959 he was awarded the title International Judge of Chess Compositions. In 1965 he founded EG, the first long-running journal exclusively for endgame studies. Roycroft served as editor and publisher through 1991. The journal continues to be published, but under Dutch ownership ("ARVES"). Roycroft remained its chief editor until 2007 when Harold van der Heijden took over. His 1972 book Test Tube Chess (revised as The Chess Endgame Study, 1981) is considered one of the best English-language examinations of endgame studies. He also served as the endgame study editor for the British Chess Magazine from 1973 to 1974.

Roycroft's adaptation of the Guy–Blandford code in the 1970s resulted in the Guy–Blandford–Roycroft code, an efficient way to index endgame studies – or any chess position. He also advised Ken Thompson in writing programs for endgame data bases with four and five pieces. For queen and pawn against queen some results were published by Roycroft in three booklets in 1986, years ahead of full tablebase output on CD.

== Other ==
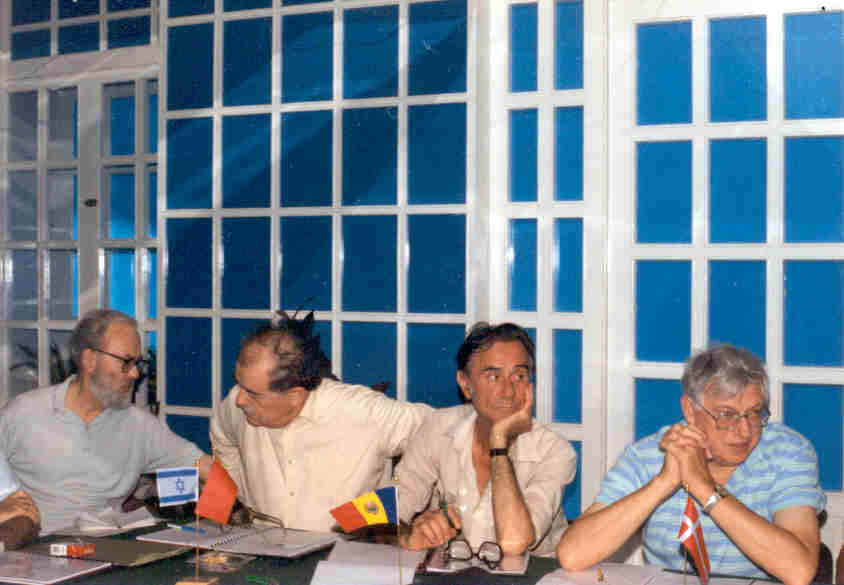
1990 at the PCCC Session in Benidorm (Spain) (from left to right): John Roycroft, Gia Nadareishvili, Virgil Nestorescu and Jan Mortensen

Roycroft worked for IBM UK from 1961 until early retirement in 1987. From April 1984 to October 1985 he was seconded to Donald Michie (Machine Intelligence Research Unit, Edinburgh, followed by The Turing Institute, Glasgow). The outcome was the paper "Expert Against Oracle" in Machine Intelligence 11, Clarendon Press 1988.

John Roycroft was President of Hendon Chess Club until he moved to Oxfordshire in 2018, where he attends Cumnor Chess Club meetings. He was married to Betty Roycroft for nearly 60 years until her death in July 2020, and they have two grown up children, Jonathan - who is Director of Sports at Oxford University and Katherine - who lives in Italy and runs her own private language school.

== Literature ==
- Test Tube Chess, Faber and Faber Limited, 1972, ISBN 0-571-09573-9. Revision: The Chess Endgame Study, 1981, Dover.
- Queen and Pawn on a2 against Queen, Chess Endgame Consultants and Publishers, April 1986, ISBN 1-869874-00-5
- Queen and Pawn on a6 against Queen, Chess Endgame Consultants and Publishers, May 1986, ISBN 1-869874-05-6
- Queen and Pawn on b7 against Queen, Chess Endgame Consultants and Publishers, June 1986, ISBN 1-869874-10-2
