= Leonid Kubbel =

Russian chess player (1891–1942)

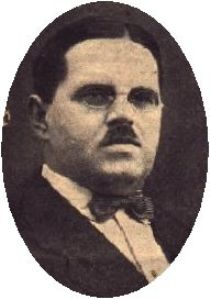
Leonid Kubbel

Karl Artur Leonid Kubbel (Russian: Леонид Иванович Куббель, romanized: Leonid Ivanovich Kubbel; 1891 or 1892 – 1942) was a Russian composer of chess endgame studies and problems.

== Life ==
Kubbel was born in Saint Petersburg at the end of 1891, or beginning of 1892 and died in the same city (then called Leningrad) on 18 April 1942. He was christened Karl Artur Leonid, but dropped the first two names around the time of the 1917 Russian Revolution.

He composed more than 1500 endgame studies and chess problems, many of which were awarded first prize for their great beauty and original conception. He was also a fairly strong over the board player finishing 5th in Leningrad championships on 2 occasions (1929, 1930). He is generally considered one of the greatest of all endgame composers. He was a chemical engineer by profession.

Leonid's brothers, Arvid and Evgeny, were also chess players. Arvid Kubbel was a strong over-the-board master, having played in the first four USSR chess championships, while Evgeny was himself an endgame composer. Both Leonid and Evgeny Kubbel died of starvation in 1942 during the Nazi siege of Leningrad, while Arvid was executed by the NKVD in 1938.

== A study by Leonid Kubbel ==
This is one of Leonid Kubbel's many masterpieces. The Black a-pawn apparently cannot be stopped from promotion, after which the game would be lost for White; however, a subtle plan avoids defeat and checkmates the black king. Video analysis of this study can be found here on YouTube.

Leonid Kubbel
Schachmatny Listok 1922

Position: b8 white knight, a6 white king, d5 black king, d4 black pawn, h4 white bishop, a3 black pawn, c2 white pawn, d2 white pawn

White to move and win

Solution:

- 1. Nc6!! (threatens Nb4+, blocking the a-pawn) Kxc6
- 2. Bf6 Kd5
- 3. d3 a2
- 4. c4+ Kc5(4....dxc3 5.Bxc3 is a simple technical win)
- 5. Kb7! a1=Q (if 5...Kd6 or 5... Kb4 then 6.Bxd4 stopping the pawn)
- 6. Be7 checkmate.

== Works on Leonid Kubbel ==
- 25 ausgewählte Endspielstudien von Leonid Kubbel (German), Jan van Reek, 1996.
- Leonid Kubbel’s Chess Endgame Studies, TG Whitworth, 2004.
- Леонид Куббель (Russian), J. Vladimirowitsch and Y.Fokin, 1984.
