= André Chéron (chess player) =

French chess player (1895–1980)

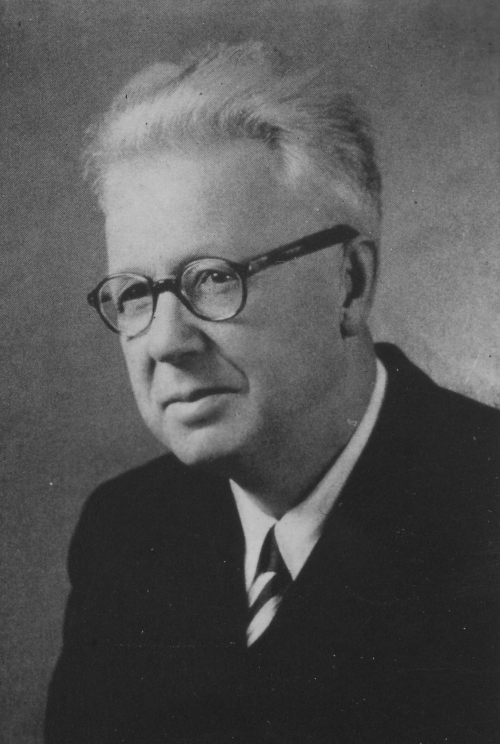
André Chéron

Chéron, 1955

Position: c4 white knight, g3 black pawn, a2 black king, c2 white king, g2 white knight

White wins with either side to move, see two knights endgame

André Chéron (September 25, 1895 – September 12, 1980) was a French chess player, endgame theorist, and a composer of endgame studies. He was named a FIDE International Master of Chess Composition in 1959, the first year the title was awarded.

Chéron was the French champion three times (1926, 1927, and 1929) and played on the French team at the 1927 Chess Olympiad. He is best known for his work in the theory of endgames, where he was most concerned with detailed proofs about theoretical endgame results. He composed hundreds of endgame studies. His life's work is the monumental four-volume Lehr- und Handbuch der Endspiele (the German title), which was first published in French in 1952 and published in German in 1952–58 (and a second revised edition in 1962–70). It studies basic endgames and endgame studies, with material drawn from many sources including his own contributions. He also wrote Traité complet d'échecs and an updated version Nouveau traité complet d'échecs, half of which was about the endgame. He lived in Switzerland for many years.

== See also ==
- Chess endgame literature
