= Henri Rinck =

Jean Henri Rinck
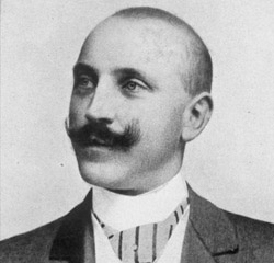
- Henri Rinck
- Born: 10 January 1870; 2nd arrondissement of Lyon
- Died: 18 February 1952; Badalona
- Education: Technical University of Munich
- Occupation: chess composer
- Writing career
- Language: French
- Genre: chess theory
- Subject: endgame
- Notable work: Rinck (1950)

Henri Rinck (January 10, 1870 – February 17, 1952) was a French chess study composer, considered one of the most important early figures in the field.

== Biography ==
Henri Rinck was born in Lyon (France) on 10 January 1870, where his family were brewers (Brasserie Rinck). He graduated as a chemical engineer at the Technische Hochschule of Munich (Germany). He then worked at the Faculté des Sciences in Lyon as an assistant of Dr. Barbier.

In 1897 he discovered a refining process for green vegetable oils, which was applied in Marseille (France), then by several olive oil refineries in Spain. In 1900 he set up a factory in Badalona (Spain) and lived there with his family. Before the end of the Spanish Civil War he had to leave Spain. He established himself in Marseille, but returned to Spain later.

His first chess endgame studies appeared from 1902 in the Deutsche Schachzeitung. In 1909 he published the first collection 150 fins de partie (with an introduction by Johann Berger). A second edition followed in 1913, a third edition in 1919 (300 fins de partie) and a fourth edition in 1927 (700 fins de partie). In 1947 he published Las sorpresas de la teoría (The Surprises of Theory), containing 111 endgames on two rooks against two minor pieces, and, together with Louis Malpas, Dame contre tour et cavalier (Queen against Rook and Knight). Rinck was one of the most prolific composers, having published as many as 1670 endgame studies, 58 of which won first prize in tourneys of study composition.

Rinck died in Badalona on 18 February 1952. Six days before his death he was handed out the first copy of his ultimate collection 1414 fins de partie. On his request he was buried with this book under his arm.

== Composition ==
The diagram below shows one of Rincks' controversial studies.

Henri Rinck
1414 fins de partie, nr. 126

Position: b7 black king, f7 black queen, c4 black pawn, h4 white queen, c2 white king, h2 white rook, f1 black rook

White to move and win

Solution:

1. Qe4+ Ka6 2. Rh6+ Rf6 3. Qf5! wins

1. ... Kb8 2. Rh8+ Kc7 3. Rh7 Rf2+ 4. Kc3 Rf3+ 5. Kd4(b4) wins
1. ... Kb6 2. Rh6+ Kc5(a5,b5) 3. Qe5+ Qd5 4. Qc7+ wins

André Chéron considered the study incorrect:
Black would draw with 1. Qe4+ Ka6 2. Rh6+ Rf6 3. Qf5 Rxh6 4. Qxf7 Rc6!=

Computer analysis however has proved the correctness of the study:
after 4...Rc6 White delivers mate in 34 moves.
