= Gia Nadareishvili =

Soviet Georgian chess player

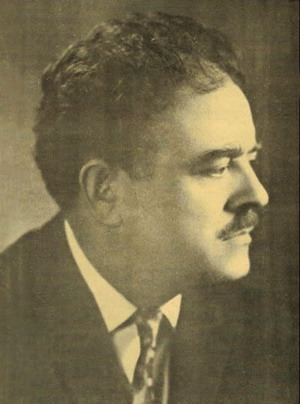
Gia Nadareishvili

Gia Nadareishvili (Georgian: გია ნადარეიშვილი; September 22, 1921 – October 3, 1991) was a Soviet chess composer of Georgian nationality (born in Tbilisi), and author of many books on chess studies.

He was co-founder, with John Roycroft and others, of the Permanent Commission for Chess Composition (PCCC), a body of FIDE presiding over chess composition. He was the USSR delegate in the annual meetings of PCCC until his death. In 1980 he was awarded from FIDE the title of Grandmaster for chess composition.

Nadareishvili composed about 500 studies, winning 21 first prizes, 25 second prizes and 20 third prizes in international tourneys. He published many books on endgame studies, including a collection of 312 studies commented by 43 famous grandmasters.

By profession Nadareishvili was a neurologist, head of the neurology department of the central hospital of Tbilisi. He was awarded the title of Honorary Doctor by the Georgian state.

== A study by Gia Nadareishvili ==
Gia Nadareishvili

Position: f8 white rook, f6 white rook, g5 black rook, d4 black bishop, e4 white knight, h3 white king, g2 black pawn, h1 black king

White to play and win

Solution:

1. Rf1+! g1=N+ (after 2. g1=Q? white takes the black rook, other black moves lead to a quicker mate)
2. Rxg1+ Rxg1 3. Rf2!! Be5 (otherwise black gets checkmated immediately)
4. Rh2+! Bxh2 5. Nf2 mate.
