= International Judge of Chess Compositions =

International Judge of Chess Compositions is a title award by FIDE via the World Federation for Chess Composition (WFCC; until 2010 Permanent Commission of the FIDE for Chess Compositions, PCCC) to individuals who have judged several chess problem or study tournaments and who are considered capable of judging such awards at the highest level.

The title was first awarded in 1956. In the past, a number of famous over-the-board players have also been International Judges, including Mikhail Botvinnik, Vasily Smyslov, David Bronstein, Paul Keres, Yuri Averbakh and Wolfgang Unzicker, though in modern times the title is generally held by individuals largely unknown outside the world of problems. Many notable problem and study composers are also International Judges, including Genrikh Kasparyan.
