= Shakhmaty v SSSR =

Soviet chess magazine

Shakhmaty v SSSR, issue 6 of 1951, Mikhail Botvinnik and David Bronstein (World Chess Championship 1951) on the cover

Shakhmaty v SSSR (Russian: Шахматы в СССР; Chess in the USSR) was a Soviet chess magazine published between 1931 and 1991. It was edited by Viacheslav Ragozin for several years. Yuri Averbakh was also an editor. From 1921 or 1925 through 1930 it was titled Shakhmatny Listok (Chess Papers) and edited by Alexander Ilyin-Genevsky. The circulation was 55,000. The magazine was published by the USSR Chess Federation.
