= Chess composer =

Creator of endgame studies or chess problems

A chess composer is a person who creates endgame studies or chess problems. Chess composers usually specialize in a particular genre, e.g. endgame studies, twomovers, threemovers, moremovers, helpmates, selfmates, fairy problems, or retrograde analysis. Moreover, composers have their own preferred style of composing, allowing their sorting according to composition schools.

Some chess composers produce huge numbers of chess compositions, while others try to achieve as much quality as possible and present new works only rarely.

It is possible for chess composers to gain official FIDE titles, usually for a given number of problems published in FIDE Albums. For example, Milan Vukcevich was an International Grandmaster of Chess Composition, as well as an International Master player.

The WFCC (World Federation for Chess Composition), formerly known as PCCC, is a branch of FIDE regulating the awarding of titles such as International Grandmaster, International master, Master FIDE and International Judge for chess composition.

== Schools of composition ==
Composition school in chess composition is a particular style of creating chess problems, putting emphasis on different aspects of the problem contents and attracting the interest of an important number of chess composers. The best-known composition schools, as they evolved historically, are:

- Old German school put emphasis on complexity and difficulty of solution and model mate in the main variation, the most suitable genres being fourmovers and fivemovers;
- Bohemian school puts emphasis on artistic beauty and number of variations finished by model mates, the most suitable genres being threemovers and fourmovers;
- English school demanded dual-free play in all variations and put emphasis on varied motivation in high number of variations;
- American school puts emphasis on originality and presence of surprising elements in the solution;
- New German school (also known as logical school) requires logical structure of solution and purity (or economy) of aim, the longer genres are more suitable;
- New Bohemian school combines requirements of new German school and Bohemian school;
- Strategical school puts emphasis on complexity of motivation in high number of variations, both defence and harmful motifs should be unified whenever possible, mostly in twomovers and threemovers;
- Soviet school is a highly developed level of strategic school;
- New-strategical school requires changes of variations or move functions between phases;
- Slovak school requires changes of motifs between phases.

Many chess problems are clearly attributable to a specific one of these schools, but there are many problems that might be attributed to none of these or to more than one of them. Today, many chess composers regularly do work in the area of multiple schools.

== Notable chess composers ==
- Fadil Abdurahmanovic
- Edith Baird
- Pal Benko
- Gijs van Breukelen
- Vladimir Bron
- André Chéron
- Eugene Cook
- Thomas Rayner Dawson
- Vincent Lanius Eaton
- Karl Fabel
- Edgar Holladay
- Bernhard Horwitz
- Genrikh Kasparyan
- Cyril Kipping
- Josef Kling
- Leonid Kubbel
- Sam Loyd
- Comins Mansfield
- William Meredith
- Geoffrey Mott-Smith
- Vladimir Nabokov
- Geoffrey Peckover
- Vasily Platov
- Henri Rinck
- Aleksei Selesniev
- William Shinkman
- Alexei Troitsky
- Milan Vukcevich
- Alain Campbell White

== See also ==
- List of grandmasters for chess composition
- List of chess endgame study composers
