= Endgame study =

Composed chess endgame position

In the game of chess, an endgame study, or just study, is a type of chess problem that starts with a composed position—i.e. one that has been made up rather than played in an actual game—where the goal is to find the essentially unique way for one side (usually White) to win or draw, as stipulated, against any moves the other side plays. If the study does not end in the end of the game, then the game's eventual outcome should be obvious, and White can have a selection of various moves. There is no limit to the number of moves which are allowed to achieve the win; this distinguishes studies from the genre of direct mate problems (e.g. "mate in 2"). Such problems also differ qualitatively from the very common genre of tactical puzzles based around the middlegame, often based on an actual game, where a decisive tactic must be found.

== Composed studies ==
Composed studies predate the modern form of chess. Shatranj studies exist in manuscripts from the 9th century, and the earliest treatises on modern chess by the likes of Luis Ramirez Lucena and Pedro Damiano (late 15th and early 16th century) also include studies. However, these studies often include superfluous pieces, added to make the position look more "game-like", but which take no part in the actual solution (something that is never done in the modern study). Various names were given to these positions (Damiano, for example, called them "subtleties"); the first book which called them "studies" appears to be Chess Studies, an 1851 publication by Josef Kling and Bernhard Horwitz, which is sometimes also regarded as the starting point for the modern endgame study. The form is considered to have been raised to an art in the late 19th century, with A. A. Troitsky and Henri Rinck particularly important in this respect.

Most composers, including Troitsky, Rinck, and other famous figures such as Genrikh Kasparyan, are known primarily for their studies, being little known as players. However, some famous players have also composed endgame studies, with Emanuel Lasker, Richard Réti, Vasily Smyslov, and Jan Timman being perhaps the most notable ones.

== Examples ==
Richard Réti,
Ostrauer Morgenzeitung Dec. 4, 1921

Position: h8 white king, a6 black king, c6 white pawn, h5 black pawn

White to play and draw. One of the most famous studies of all time.

Richard Réti's study is one of the most famous of all time. It is White to play and draw. At first sight, this seems an impossible task: if White tries to chase after Black's pawn he can never catch it (1.Kh7 h4 2.Kh6 h3 etc. is clearly hopeless), while it is clear that Black will simply take White's pawn if he tries to promote it.

White can draw, however, by taking advantage of the fact that the king can move towards both pawns at once. The solution is 1. Kg7! h4 (1...Kb6 2. Kf6! h4 3.Ke5! transposes) 2. Kf6! Kb6 (if 2...h3, then 3.Ke6 h2 4.c7 Kb7 5.Kd7 allows white to promote his pawn) 3. Ke5! Now, if 3...Kxc6, then 4.Kf4 stops Black's pawn after all, while if 3...h3 4.Kd6 allows White to promote his pawn. Either way, the result is a draw. (See also King and pawn versus king endgame § Rule of the square.)

Genrikh Kasparyan, Magyar Sakkélet 1962

Position: h7 black king, d6 black bishop, f6 white king, h6 white bishop, a4 black pawn, a3 black pawn, a2 white rook, b1 black bishop

White to play and draw. An example of a more complicated study.

Position: h7 black king, c4 black bishop, d4 white bishop, e4 white king, a3 black pawn, a2 black pawn, b2 black bishop, g1 white rook

Position after 8.Rg1 (see analysis)

Not all studies are as simple as the above Réti example. This study (first diagram) is by Genrikh Kasparyan (first published in Magyar Sakkélet, 1962). White is to play and draw. The main line of the solution is 1. Ra1 a2 2. Ke6 Ba3 3. Bf4 Bb2 4. Be5 a3 5. Kd5 Bg6 6. Bd4 Bf7+ 7. Ke4 Bc4 8. Rg1, but there are various alternatives for both sides. For example, White could try 1.Bf4 on his first move, with the idea 1...Bxa2 2.Bxd6 and 3.Bxa3 is a draw, but Black can defeat this idea with 1...Bxf4 2.Rxa3 Bc2, which wins. To understand why one move works and another one does not, requires quite advanced chess knowledge. Indeed, it will not be obvious to many players that the position at the end of the given line (second diagram) is a draw at all.

Leopold Mitrofanov,
MT Rustaveli 1967 (corrected)

Position: a7 black king, a6 white pawn, d6 black bishop, g6 white pawn, a5 white king, b5 white pawn, d5 white pawn, e5 black knight, h5 white pawn, e4 white rook, g2 black knight, h2 black pawn

White to play and win

One of the most notable studies is Leopold Mitrofanov's 1967 first-prize winner. Unfortunately, Mitrofanov's original study was subsequently found to have a cook, a miraculous defense that enabled Black either to obtain perpetual check or reach a drawn ending.

Solution: 1. b6+ Ka8 2. Re1! Nxe1 3. g7 h1=Q (if 3...Nc4+ then 4.Kb5 h1=Q 5.g8=Q+ Bb8 6.a7 Na3+ 7.Kc6 Qh2 8.axb8=Q+ Qxb8 9.b7+ Ka7 10.Qg1+ Ka6 11.Qb6 mate) 4. g8=Q+ Bb8 5. a7 Nc6+ 6. dxc6 Qxh5+ 7. Qg5!! (not 7.Ka6? Qe2+ or 7.Kb4? Qh4+ with perpetual check) Qxg5+ 8. Ka6 (the queen is deflected from the white diagonal where she could give check) 8... Bxa7 (or 8...Qb5+ 9.Kxb5 Nc2 10.c7 and wins) 9. c7! (a silent move; the double threat c8=Q+ and b7 mate forces Black to sacrifice the queen) 9... Qa5+ 10. Kxa5 Kb7 11. bxa7 and White wins.

=== Early example ===
al-Adli (~800–870),
Arabic manuscript 1140

Position: a7 black king, b7 black knight, b5 white king, h1 white rook

White wins with either side to move

Most old shatranj studies are not valid in modern chess because of changed rules. However, the moves of the king, rook, and knight are unchanged. In this Arabic study White wins because the black knight is poorly placed. With White to move the best move is 1. Rd1, but it is not the only winning move. If Black is to move, 1... Kb8! 2. Kc6! Na5+! 3. Kb6! Nc4+ 4. Kb5! Ne5 5. Re1! Nd7 6. Kc6! wins.

== Studies and special moves ==
The special moves or rules of chess, such as castling, underpromotion, double-square pawn advance, and en passant are commonly a key feature of studies, as are sacrifices.

=== Castling ===
Alexey Selezniev,
Tidskrift for Schack 1921

Position: b6 black king, d6 white pawn, b2 black rook, a1 white rook, e1 white king

White wins

Castling in the endgame occurs seldom and is more often seen in studies. Here is one example where White wins by privilege of castling rights.

Try: 1.0-0-0? Ra2! 2.d7 Ra1+ 3.Kc2 Rxd1 4.Kxd1 Kc7 drawn.

White needs: 1. d7! Kc7 2. d8=Q+! Kxd8 3. 0-0-0+ simultaneously attacking the king and rook that is captured next move.

== Study engineering ==
Frédéric Lazard,
L’Italia, Scacchistica 1946

Position: a8 black queen, c6 black pawn, a5 white bishop, d5 black pawn, g5 black pawn, h5 black pawn, f4 black pawn, g4 black pawn, c3 white knight, g3 black king, g2 white pawn, h1 white king

White to play and draw

With the creation and popularization of chess-playing computer software programs, many of which have achieved Elo ratings significantly higher than top human players, many composers collaborate with them both in composing and solving compositions. Though proven to be helpful, positions have been found which cause even the strongest engines to incorrectly evaluate the outcome. Chess master Frédéric Lazard's 1946 composition is White to play and draw.

Solution: 1. Ne4+ Kh4 (1...dxe4 2.Be1#) 2. Ng3! Qf8 (2...fxg3 3.Bb6!! and black cannot advance his pawns as the bishop will take them; if he recaptures it is stalemate. Check with the queen is met by Bg1 and stalemate.) 3. Be1 fxg3 4. Bf2! d4 (4...Qxf2 stalemate, 4...gxf2 5.g3+ Kh3 stalemate) 5. Bxd4 c5 6. Bxc5 Qf1+ 7. Bg1 Qf2 8. Bxf2 gxf2 9. g3+ Kxg3 drawn.

== See also ==
- List of chess endgame study composers
- Saavedra position
