= List of grandmasters for chess composition =

This article lists:

- International Grandmasters for chess composition, for both chess problems and studies
- International Honorary Masters for chess composition
- International Solving Grandmasters

Such awards were formerly managed by FIDE through its section for chess composition, the Permanent Commission for Chess Composition, and now awarded by the World Federation for Chess Composition, an independent body that co-operates with FIDE.

== International Grandmasters for chess compositions ==
Note: deceased Grandmasters are indicated with (†) – Nationality is that of the year when the title was awarded.

Year	Name	Country
1972	Genrich Kasparjan (†)	Soviet Union
1972	Lev Loshinskij (†)	Soviet Union
1972	Comins Mansfield (†)	United Kingdom
1972	Eeltje Visserman (†)	Netherlands
1976	Vladimir Bron (†)	Soviet Union
1976	Jindrich Fritz (†)	Czechoslovakia
1976	Vladimir Korolkov (†)	Soviet Union
1976	Vladimir Pachman (†)	Czechoslovakia
1976	György Paros (†)	Hungary
1976	Nenad Petrović (†)	Yugoslavia
1980	György Bakcsi (†)	Hungary
1980	Hrvoje Bartolović (†)	Yugoslavia
1980	Bo Lindgren (†)	Sweden
1980	Gia Nadareishvili (†)	Soviet Union
1980	Valentin Rudenko (†)	Soviet Union
1984	Claude Goumondy	France
1984	Iosif Krikheli (†)	Soviet Union
1984	Petko Petkov	Bulgaria
1984	Hans Peter Rehm	West Germany
1984	Touw Hian Bwee	Indonesia
1988	Cor Goldschmeding (†)	Netherlands
1988	Alexandr Grin-Guljaev (†)	Soviet Union
1988	Ernest Pogosjancz (†)	Soviet Union
1988	Jakov Vladimirov	Soviet Union
1988	Milan Vukčević (†)	United States
1989	Herbert Ahues (†)	West Germany
1989	Viktor Chepizhnij	Soviet Union
1989	Emilian Dobrescu	Romania
1990	David Gurgenidze	Soviet Union
1990	Jacobus Haring (†)	Netherlands
1992	Fadil Abdurahmanović	Yugoslavia
1992	Jan Rusinek	Poland
1993	Venelin Alaikov (†)	Bulgaria
1993	Michel Caillaud	France
1993	Andrej Lobusov (†)	Russia
1993	Norman Macleod (†)	United Kingdom
1993	Byron Zappas (†)	Greece
1995	Michael Keller	Germany
1995	Alexandr Kuzovkov	Moldova
1996	Toma Garai (†)	United States
1996	Živko Janevski	North Macedonia
2001	Virgil Nestorescu	Romania
2004	Unto Heinonen	Finland
2004	Jean-Marc Loustau	France
2004	Mikhail Marandyuk	Ukraine
2004	Waldemar Tura	Poland
2005	Udo Degener	Germany
2005	Nikolai Kralin	Russia
2005	Franz Pachl	Germany
2005	Oleg Pervakov	Russia
2007	Alexandr Feoktistov	Russia
2007	Yves Cheylan	France
2007	Marjan Kovačević	Serbia
2007	Miodrag Mladenović	Serbia
2007	Valery Shanshin	Russia
2007	Valery Shavyrin	Russia
2007	Anatoly Slesarenko	Russia
2009	Uri Avner (†)	Israel
2009	Andrey Selivanov	Russia
2010	Reto Aschwanden	Switzerland
2010	Wieland Bruch	Germany
2010	Vasyl Dyachuk	Ukraine
2010	Camillo Gamnitzer	Austria
2010	Matti Myllyniemi (†)	Finland
2010	Marcel Tribowski	Germany
2010	Milan Velimirović (†)	Serbia
2010	Klaus Wenda	Austria
2012	Evgeny Bogdanov (†)	Ukraine
2012	Michal Dragoun	Czech Republic
2012	Valery Gurov	Russia
2012	Peter Gvozdjak	Slovakia
2012	Miroslav Havel (†)	Czech Republic
2012	Christopher Jones	United Kingdom
2012	Artur Mandler (†)	Czech Republic
2012	Mario Parrinello	Italy
2012	Ivan Soroka	Ukraine
2013	Alexandr Azhusin	Russia
2013	Anatoly Styopochkin	Russia
2015	Yochanan Afek	Israel
2015	Hubert Gockel	Germany
2015	John Rice	United Kingdom
2015	Aleksey Sochnev	Russia
2017	Richard Becker	United States
2023	Steffen Slumstrup Nielsen	Denmark
2023	Manfred Rittirsch	Germany

== International Honorary Masters for chess composition ==
Year	Name	Country
1986	Antonio Arguelles (†)	Spain
1986	John Niemann (†)	West Germany
1986	Antonio Piatesi (†)	Italy
1987	Hans Klüver (†)	West Germany
1987	Grzegorz Grzeban (†)	Poland
1988	Alexander Pituk (†)	Czechoslovakia
1988	Janos Kiss (†)	Hungary
1988	Ferenc Fleck (†)	Hungary
1989	Gino Mentasti (†)	Italy
1991	Albert Koldijk (†)	Netherlands
1991	Jean Zeller (†)	France
1992	Colin Vaughan (†)	United Kingdom
1994	Kurt Smulders (†)	Belgium
1998	Eliahu Fasher (†)	Israel
1999	Giorgio Mirri (†)	Italy
1999	Savo Zlatić (†)	Croatia
2000	Rui Nascimento (†)	Portugal
2006	Jeremy Morse (†)	United Kingdom
2007	Sonomun Chimedtseren (†)	Mongolia
2007	Odette Vollenweider	Switzerland
2012	Hermann Weissauer (†)	Germany
2015	Hannu Harkola	Finland

== International Solving Grandmasters ==
Year	Name	Country
1982	Pauli Perkonoja	Finland
1984	Kari Valtonen	Finland
1984	Milan Velimirović (†)	Yugoslavia
1985	Ofer Comay	Israel
1988	Roland Baier	Switzerland
1988	Marjan Kovačević	Yugoslavia
1988	Arno Zude	West Germany
1991	Georgy Evseev	Soviet Union
1993	Michael Pfannkuche	Germany
1997	Jonathan Mestel	United Kingdom
1997	Sergej Rumyantsev	Russia
1998	Ram Soffer	Israel
1999	Jorma Paavilainen	Finland
2000	Boris Tummes	Germany
2001	Noam Elkies	United States
2002	Michel Caillaud	France
2002	Graham Lee	United Kingdom
2002	Piotr Murdzia	Poland
2004	John Nunn	United Kingdom
2004	Dolf Wissmann	Netherlands
2007	Alexandr Azhusin	Russia
2008	Miodrag Mladenović	Serbia
2008	Andrey Selivanov	Russia
2008	Bojan Vučković	Serbia
2009	Eddy van Beers	Belgium
2009	Vladimir Podinić	Serbia
2010	Michal Dragoun	Czech Republic
2011	Kacper Piorun	Poland
2011	Ladislav Salai Jr.	Slovakia
2014	Martynas Limontas	Lithuania
2014	Anatoly Mukoseev	Russia
2015	Oleksy Solovchuk	Ukraine
2017	Marko Filipović	Croatia

== See also ==
- List of chess grandmasters
- FIDE Album It explains the scoring required to become a master in composition.
