= World Championship of Chess Composition =

Triennial competition for composers of chess problems and studies

The World Championship of Chess Composition is a triennial competition for composers of chess problems and studies. Organised in the past by FIDE via the Permanent Commission of the FIDE for Chess Compositions (PCCC), it is currently held by the World Federation for Chess Composition (WFCC). The official title is World Championship in Composing for Individuals (WCCI).

The championship is divided into eight sections:

A) Twomovers (checkmate in two moves)
B) Threemovers (checkmate in three moves)
C) Moremovers (checkmate in more than three moves)
D) Studies
E) Helpmates
F) Selfmates
G) Fairies (using elements of fairy chess)
H) Retros (retrograde analysis)

Composers wishing to participate in any given section are expected to submit at most six of their compositions, published in the relevant three-year period and fulfilling the requirements of the section. The problems submitted are then evaluated by a commission of three Judges, and the best four of them count for the final result in the section. (More on rules is at the official PCCC page.)

Three championships have been held up to 2006 for the relevant three-year periods: 1998–2000, 2001–2003 and 2004–2006. The most successful composer so far is Mikhail Marandyuk of Ukraine, who won ten gold medals and three silver medals.

== Medalists ==
=== 1998–2000 ===
Section	Gold	Silver	Bronze
Twomovers	Viktor Chepizhny	Marjan Kovačević	Anatoly Slesarenko
Threemovers	Mikhail Marandyuk	Wieland Bruch	Martin Wessels
Moremovers	Mikhail Marandyuk	Michael Herzberg	Alexandr Kuzovkov
Studies	David Gurgenidze	Nikolay Kralin	Andrej Vysokosov
Helpmates	Živko Janevski	Valery Gurov	Fadil Abdurahmanović
Selfmates	Petko Petkov	Andrey Selivanov	Alexandr Azhusin
Fairies	Petko Petkov	Reto Aschwanden	Tadashi Wakashima
Retros	Alexandr Kisljak	Thierry Le Gleuher	Alexandr Zolotarev

=== 2001–2003 ===
Section	Gold	Silver	Bronze
Twomovers	Marjan Kovačević	Anatoly Slesarenko	Vasyl Dyachuk
Threemovers	Valery Shavirin	Mikhail Marandyuk	Juri Marker
Moremovers	Mikhail Marandyuk	Valery Shavirin	Alexandr Feoktistov
Studies	Andrej Vysokosov	Oleg Pervakov	David Gurgenidze
Helpmates	Valery Gurov	Mario Parrinello	Franz Pachl
Selfmates	Andrey Selivanov	Alexandr Feoktistov	Živko Janevski
Fairies	Reto Aschwanden	Klaus Wenda	Juraj Lörinc
Retros	Thierry Le Gleuher	Alexandr Kisljak	Reto Aschwanden

=== 2004–2006 ===
Section	Gold	Silver	Bronze
Twomovers	Vasyl Dyachuk	Marjan Kovačević	Wieland Bruch
Threemovers	Mikhail Marandyuk	Valery Shavirin	Alexandr Bakharev
Moremovers	Mikhail Marandyuk	Juri Marker	Alexandr Feoktistov
Studies	Oleg Pervakov	Alexej Sochniev	David Gurgenidze
Helpmates	Viktor Chepizhny	Valery Gurov	Michal Dragoun; Živko Janevski
Selfmates	Andrey Selivanov	Uri Avner	Živko Janevski
Fairies	Michal Dragoun	Juraj Lörinc	Klaus Wenda
Retros	Reto Aschwanden	Thierry Le Gleuher	Dmitry Baibikov

=== 2007–2009 ===
Section	Gold	Silver	Bronze
Twomovers	Marjan Kovačević	Peter Gvozdják	Vasyl Dyachuk
Threemovers	Mikhail Marandyuk	Peter Gvozdják	Alexandr Kuzovkov
Moremovers	Mikhail Marandyuk	Alexandr Kuzovkov	Alexandr Feoktistov
Studies	Oleg Pervakov	Sergiy Didukh	Yuri Bazlov
Helpmates	Alexandr Semenenko	Viktor Chepizhny	Valery Gurov
Selfmates	Andrey Selivanov	Ivan Soroka	Alexandr Feoktistov
Fairies	Petko Petkov	Peter Gvozdják	Klaus Wenda
Retros	Dmitry Baibikov	Dragan Lj. Petrović	Nicolas Dupont

=== 2010–2012 ===
Section	Gold	Silver	Bronze
Twomovers	Marjan Kovačević	Vasyl Dyachuk	Valery Shanshin
Threemovers	Alexandr Feoktistov	Mikhail Marandyuk	Alexandr Kuzovkov
Moremovers	Mikhail Marandyuk	Alexandr Kuzovkov	Alexandr Feoktistov
Studies	Sergiy Didukh	Richard Becker	Oleg Pervakov
Helpmates	Michal Dragoun	Alexandr Semenenko	Viktor Chepizhny
Selfmates	Andrey Selivanov	Torsten Linss	Diyan Kostadinov
Fairies	Petko Petkov	Vlaicu Crisan	Peter Gvozdják
Retros	Dmitry Baibikov	Nikolai Beluhov	Nicolas Dupont

=== 2013–2015 ===
Section	Gold	Silver	Bronze
Twomovers	Marjan Kovačević	Vasyl Dyachuk	Peter Gvozdják
Threemovers	Mikhail Marandyuk	Aleksandr Kuzovkov	Aleksandr Feoktistov
Moremovers	Mikhail Marandyuk	Aleksandr Kuzovkov	Fedor Davidenko
Studies	Oleg Pervakov	Yuri Bazlov	Pavel Arestov
Helpmates	Aleksandr Semenenko	Vasil Krizhanivskyi	Valery Gurov
Selfmates	Andrey Selivanov	Aleksandr Feoktistov	Mark Erenburg
Fairies	Vasyl Dyachuk	Juraj Lörinc	Ofer Comay
Retros	Dmitrij Baibikov	Silvio Baier	Nicolas Dupont

=== 2016–2018 ===
Section	Gold	Silver	Bronze
Twomovers	Vasyl Dyachuk	Marjan Kovačević	Valery Shanshin
Threemovers	Aleksandr Feoktistov	Aleksandr Kuzovkov	Valery Shavyrin
Moremovers	Mikhail Marandyuk	Aleksandr Kuzovkov	Fedor Davidenko
Studies	Oleg Pervakov	Martin Minski	Steffen Slumstrup Nielsen
Helpmates	Vasil Krizhanivskyi	Aleksandr Semenenko	Fadil Abdurahmanović
Selfmates	Andrey Selivanov	Zoran Gavrilovski	Aleksandr Kuzovkov
Fairies	Vlaicu Crișan	Petko Petkov	Lev Grolman/Borislav Gadjanski
Retros	Silvio Baier	Dmitrij Baibikov	Nicolas Dupont

=== 2019-2021 ===
Section	Gold	Silver	Bronze
Twomovers	Vasyl Dyachuk	Pavel Murashev	Marjan Kovačević
Threemovers	Aleksandr Kuzovkov	Igor Agapov	Valery Shavyrin
Moremovers	Aleksandr Kuzovkov	Mikhail Marandyuk	Valery Shavyrin
Studies	Steffen Slumstrup Nielsen	Oleg Pervakov	Serhiy Didukh
Helpmates	Mykola Kolesnik	Aleksandr Semenenko	Viktoras Paliulionis
Selfmates	Andrey Selivanov	Zoran Gavrilovski	Gennadiy Koziura
Fairies	Petko Petkov	Aleksandr Semenenko	Václav Kotěšovec
Retros	Silvio Baier	Dmitrij Baibikov	Kostas Prentos

=== 2022-2024 ===
Section	Gold	Silver	Bronze
Twomovers	Vasyl Dyachuk	Marjan Kovačević / Pavel Murashev	
Threemovers	Peter Gvozdják	Aleksandr Kuzovkov	Igor Agapov
Moremovers	Aleksandr Kuzovkov	Valery Shavyrin	Mikhail Marandyuk
Studies	Oleg Pervakov	Steffen Slumstrup Nielsen	Michael Pasman
Helpmates	Marko Ylijoki	Valery Gurov	Olexandr Semenenko
Selfmates	Andrey Selivanov	Aleksandr Feoktistov / Aleksandr Kuzovkov	
Fairies	Peter Gvozdják	Michal Dragoun	Juraj Lörinc
Retros	Silvio Baier	Dmitrij Baibikov	Andriy Frolkin

=== 2025-2027 ===
Section	Gold	Silver	Bronze
Twomovers	TBD	TBD	TBD
Threemovers	TBD	TBD	TBD
Moremovers	TBD	TBD	TBD
Studies	TBD	TBD	TBD
Helpmates	TBD	TBD	TBD
Selfmates	TBD	TBD	TBD
Fairies	TBD	TBD	TBD
Retros	TBD	TBD	TBD
