= Milan Velimirović =

Serbian chess problemist (1952–2013)

Milan Velimirović (21 April 1952 – 25 February 2013) was a Serbian chess problemist and publisher.

Milan Velimirović was born in Niš, Yugoslavia. Velimirović gained the title International solving grandmaster in 1984 and Grandmaster of chess compositions in 2010. He was also editor of Mat Plus Review and author of MatPlus Librarian software for chess problems.

Milan Velimirović
StrateGems 2000, 1. Pr.

Position: a8 white bishop, b8 white rook, c8 white knight, b7 white queen, c7 black pawn, h7 black queen, a6 white pawn, d6 black pawn, g6 black pawn, g5 black rook, a4 black pawn, c4 black king, d4 white pawn, h4 black pawn, h3 white rook, e2 white knight, a1 black knight, d1 white king, e1 black bishop

Mate in 2 moves

Try:
1.Qf3!? (threats: 2.Qd3#)
1... Rg3 2.Bd5# (Bristol)
1... Bg3 2.Qc3#
1... c6 2.Nxd6#
But: 1...Rb5!

Solution:
1.Qb1! (threats: 2.Qd3#)
1... Rg3 2.Qb5#
1... Bg3 2.Rb4# (Bristol)
1... c6 2.Nb6#
1... Nc2 2. Qa2#

Example of the Bristol theme.

== Books ==
- Milan Velimirović and Kari Valtonen: Encyclopedia of Chess Problems - Themes and Terms. Chess Informant, Belgrade 2012. ISBN 8672970640
- Milan Velimirović and Marjan Kovačević: 2345 Chess problems – Anthology of Chess Combinations. Chess Informant, Belgrade 1997. ISBN 86-7297-031-4 COBISS 8806962
