= Pachl =

Pachl (Czech feminine: Pachlová) is a surname. Notable people with the surname include:

- Carole Jane Pachl (born 1938), Canadian figure skater
- Franz Pachl (born 1951), German chess grandmaster
- Petra Pachlová (born 1986), Czech ice dancer
