= Bedrich Formánek =

Slovak chess composer (1933–2023)

Bedrich Formánek (6 June 1933 – 19 November 2023) was a Slovak chess composer.

In 1990 Bedrich Formánek gained the title FIDE Master for Chess Compositions. He is also International Judge for Chess Compositions since 1966, qualified for sections #2, #3, #n, h#.

Bedrich Formánek was a long-time delegate for Czechoslovakia and later for Slovakia in Permanent Commission of the FIDE for Chess Compositions (PCCC), serving in years 1994-2002 as PCCC President, becoming an honorary president of the current WFCC afterwards. Bedrich Formánek is well known for long-time editing chess composition columns in newspapers in Slovakia, such as Pravda, Práca, Smena and many other.

Formánek died on 19 November 2023, at the age of 90.
