= PDB =

PDB or pdb may refer to:

== Organizations ==
- Party of German-speaking Belgians (German: Partei der deutschsprachigen Belgier), a former Belgian political party
- Promised Day Brigade, a former Iraqi organization

== Science and technology ==
- Protein Data Bank, a biological molecule database
  - Protein Data Bank (file format)
- Potato dextrose broth, a microbiological growth medium
- Pee Dee Belemnite, a reference standard for isotopes; see δ^{13}C

=== Computing ===
- PDB (Palm OS), a record database format
- Pluggable database, in Oracle Database
- Program database, a debugging information format
- Python Debugger (pdb), of the Python programming language; see Stepping

== Other uses ==
- Chess Problem Database Server (PDB Server), a repository for chess problems
- Pousette-Dart Band, an American band
- President's Daily Brief, a US intelligence document

== See also ==
- 1,4-Dichlorobenzene or para-dichlorobenzene (PDCB), a chemical
- Bangladesh Power Development Board (BPDB)
