= Ladislav Salai Jr. =

Slovak chess composer and player (born 1961)

Personal information
- Born: January 18, 1961 (age 65)

Chess career
- Country: Slovakia
- Title: International Master (1994)
- Peak rating: 2460 (January 1997)

Ladislav Salai Jr. (born 18 January 1961) is a Slovak chess composer and chess player.

In 2011 Ladislav Salai Jr. gained the title International Solving Grandmaster, then in 2017 the title International Grandmaster of the FIDE for Chess Compositions.

In the Solvers' rating list of WFCC, April 2013, he was 11th with 2613 rating points.
