= Caillaud =

Caillaud is a surname. Notable people with the surname include:

- Dominique Caillaud (born 1946), French politician
- Frédéric Cailliaud (1787–1869), French naturalist, mineralogist and conchologist
- John Caillaud (1726–1812), British General who was Commander-in-Chief, India
- Michel Caillaud (born 1957), French chess problemist
