= Jan Michael Sprenger =

German chess grandmaster (born 1982)

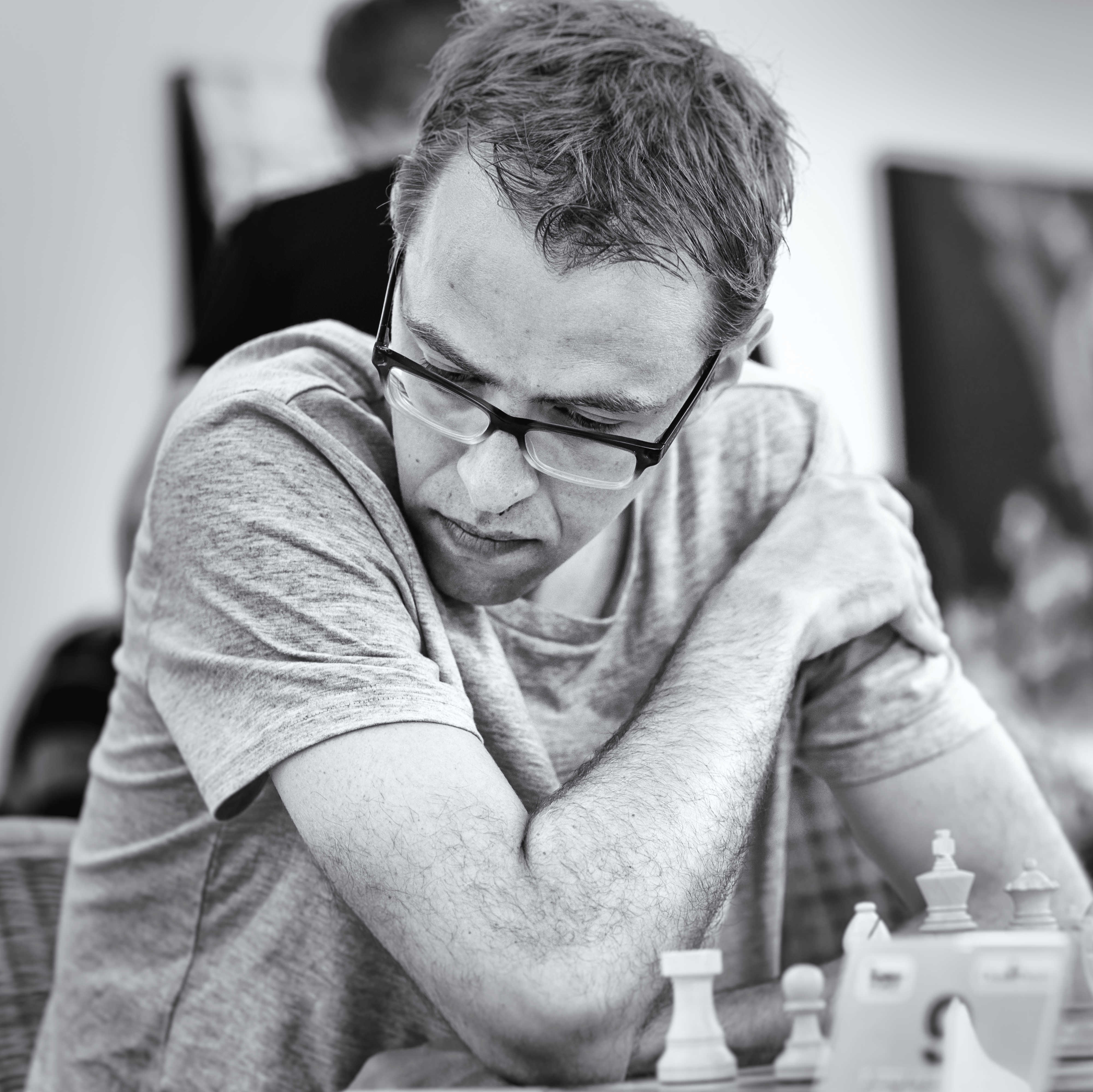
- Jan Michael Sprenger at a chess tournament in 2016 (Gallipoli, Italy)

Personal information
- Born: 26 November 1982 (age 43) Cologne, West Germany

Chess career
- Country: Germany
- Title: Grandmaster (2018)
- FIDE rating: 2468 (November 2026)
- Peak rating: 2537 (January 2008)

Jan Michael Sprenger (born 26 November 1982) is a German chess grandmaster and philosopher.

== Chess career ==
Born in 1982, Sprenger earned his international master title in 2001 and his grandmaster title in 2018. He is the No. 55 ranked German player as of March 2023. Sprenger plays in the German Chess Bundesliga for the team of Schachfreunde Berlin and writes regularly on chess-related topics.

Sprenger has started composing endgame studies in 2020. His preference goes to classical studies and themes, with attention to elegance of the positions, logical structured ideas and clarity of solutions.

On World Championship of Chess Composition 2019-2021, he was ranked 17th. On World Championship of Chess Composition 2022-2024, he was ranked 6th, confirming his growth in the composition field.

In 2023 he was awarded the FIDE Master title by the World Federation for Chess Composition (WFCC).

== Academic career ==
Sprenger holds a PhD in philosophy from the University of Bonn (2008), specializing in philosophy of science, and worked afterwards at Tilburg University, where he was appointed professor in 2014. In 2017, he became professor of philosophy at the University of Turin.

He is fluent in German, English, Dutch and Italian.

== Publications ==
2019. Bayesian Philosophy of Science (with Stephan Hartmann). Oxford: Oxford University Press.
