= Serhiy Didukh =

Ukrainian chess composer and economist (born 1976)

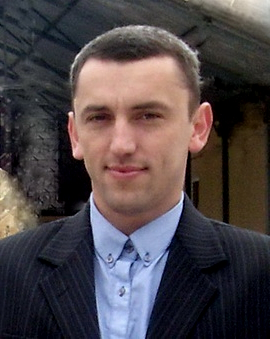
Serhiy Didukh

Serhiy Ihorovych Didukh (Ukrainian: Сергій Ігорович Дидух, born 31 May 1976) is a Ukrainian chess composer and economist.

He is an International FIDE Master for chess composition, and one of the most recognized critics in the field of endgame studies. He is known for his analytical style, high-level compositions, and for founding the website Chess Study Art, where he regularly publishes reviews, rankings, and essays on modern studies.

He is also the author of the digital collection 100 Memorable Studies.

== Chess composition career ==
Didukh began composing chess studies in the early 2000s and quickly gained recognition. As of 2024, he has composed over 240 published studies, many of which have won awards in international competitions.

- In the World Championship in Composing for Individuals (WCCI) 2010–2012, he won first place in Section D (Endgame Studies), thus becoming World Champion.
- Didukh did not participate in the WCCI 2013-2015, but in the subsequent editions, he achieved a 4th place (WCCI 2016-2018), 3rd place (WCCI 2019-2021), and 5th place (WCCI 2022-2024, all for Endgame Studies).

His style is characterized by clear logic, ambitious themes, and a tendency toward rigorous construction.

== Critical work and influence ==
In addition to composing, Didukh is known for his theoretical and critical contributions to chess composition. Since 2003, he has maintained the blog Chess Study Art, where he publishes rankings, annual evaluations, and sometimes critiques of other composers' works. His writing, though occasionally controversial, is appreciated for depth of analysis and commitment to the artistic side of chess. Several experienced composers, including Jan Michael Sprenger, Martin Minski, Gady Costeff and Yochanan Afek, have acknowledged Didukh's extensive knowledge of the field.

He is known for Study of the Year and Top 10 of the Year reviews, as well as thematic articles such as his 2021 post “The Year in Review”, in which he evaluates the most significant studies of the year.

== Academic background ==
Serhiy Didukh holds a PhD and Doctorate in Economics from Ukrainian institutions. His academic research focuses on inclusive regional development, sustainable agglomerations, and the role of agricultural holdings in territorial growth.
