= Georgy Evseev =

Russian chess problemist (born 1962)

Personal information
- Born: Georgy Aleksandrovich Evseev; May 28, 1962 (age 64) Moscow, Russian SFSR, Soviet Union

Chess career
- Country: Russia
- World Champion: World Chess Solving Champion (1989, 1990, 1991, 1998)

Georgy Aleksandrovich Evseev (Russian: Георгий Александрович Евсеев; born 28 May 1962) is a Russian chess problemist.

== Career ==
Evseev won four times the Soviet Union Chess Solving Championship (1982, 1984, 1986, 1989). He is the first chess player to win three times in a row the individual World Chess Solving Championship: 1989, 1990 and 1991. In 1998 he repeated the success for the fourth time. In 1991 Evseev gained the title of International Solving Grandmaster. In 2014 he convincingly won the Russia Chess Solving Championship. In 2015 Evseev won the European Chess Solving Championship in Iași, Romania. As of January 2016, he is the leader of the WFCC solvers’ ranking.
