= Zude =

Zude is a name. It may refer to:

- Arno Zude (born 1964), German chess player and problemist
- Chen Zude (1944–2012), Chinese professional Go player
- Song Zude (born 1968), Chinese businessman and entertainer

== Other ==
- Zude (portmanteau), a portmanteau for the characters Jude Kinkade and Zero on the VH1 series Hit the Floor
