= Piotr Murdzia =

Polish chess problemist (born 1975)

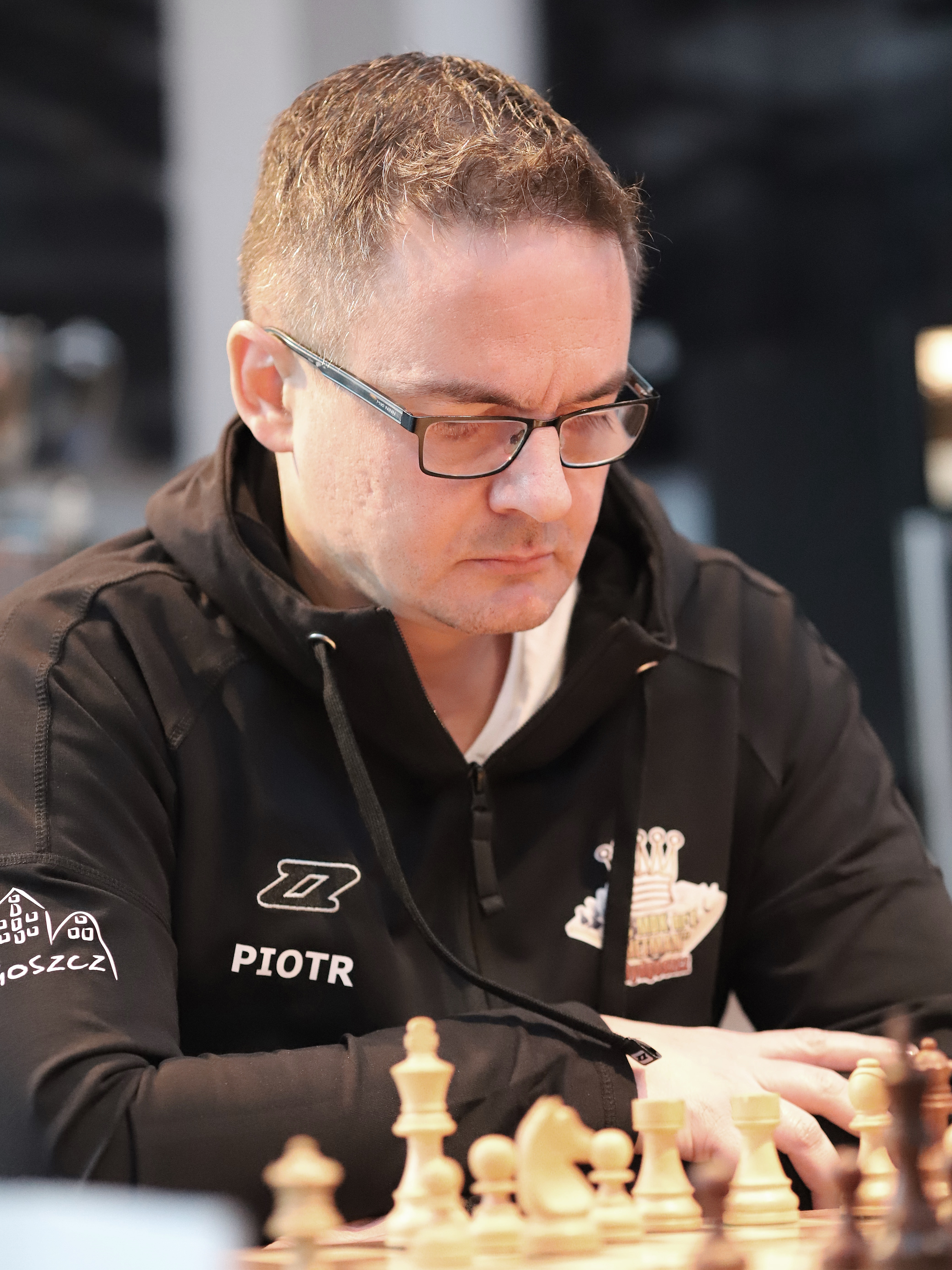
- Piotr Murdzia, Bydgoszcz 2022

Personal information
- Born: February 20, 1975 (age 51) Gdańsk, Poland

Chess career
- Country: Poland
- Title: International Master (1994)
- FIDE rating: 2409 (November 2026)
- Peak rating: 2485 (November 2009)

Piotr Murdzia (born 20 February 1975, in Gdańsk) is a Polish chess International Master, International Solving Grandmaster, and eight-time world champion in chess problem solving. He is known as one of the best chess problem solvers in the world.

== Chess career ==
He was awarded the IM title by FIDE in 1994. He won tournaments in Świdnica (1998) and Legnica (2003) making two grandmaster's norms.

He has won the World Chess Solving Championship nine times (2002, 2005, 2006, 2008, 2009, 2012, 2013, 2018, 2025) and placed second four times (2001, 2004, 2010, 2014). He also won the gold medal seven times in the team event of the same competition (2009, 2010, 2011, 2012, 2013, 2014, 2015). Murdzia also won eight times the European Chess Solving Championship (2006, 2008, 2009, 2012, 2012, 2013, 2014, 2016) and four times its team competition (2009, 2013, 2014, 2015).

In the solvers' rating list of WFCC of April 2016, he is third with 2717 points.
