= Bojan Vučković =

Serbian chess Grandmaster (born 1980)

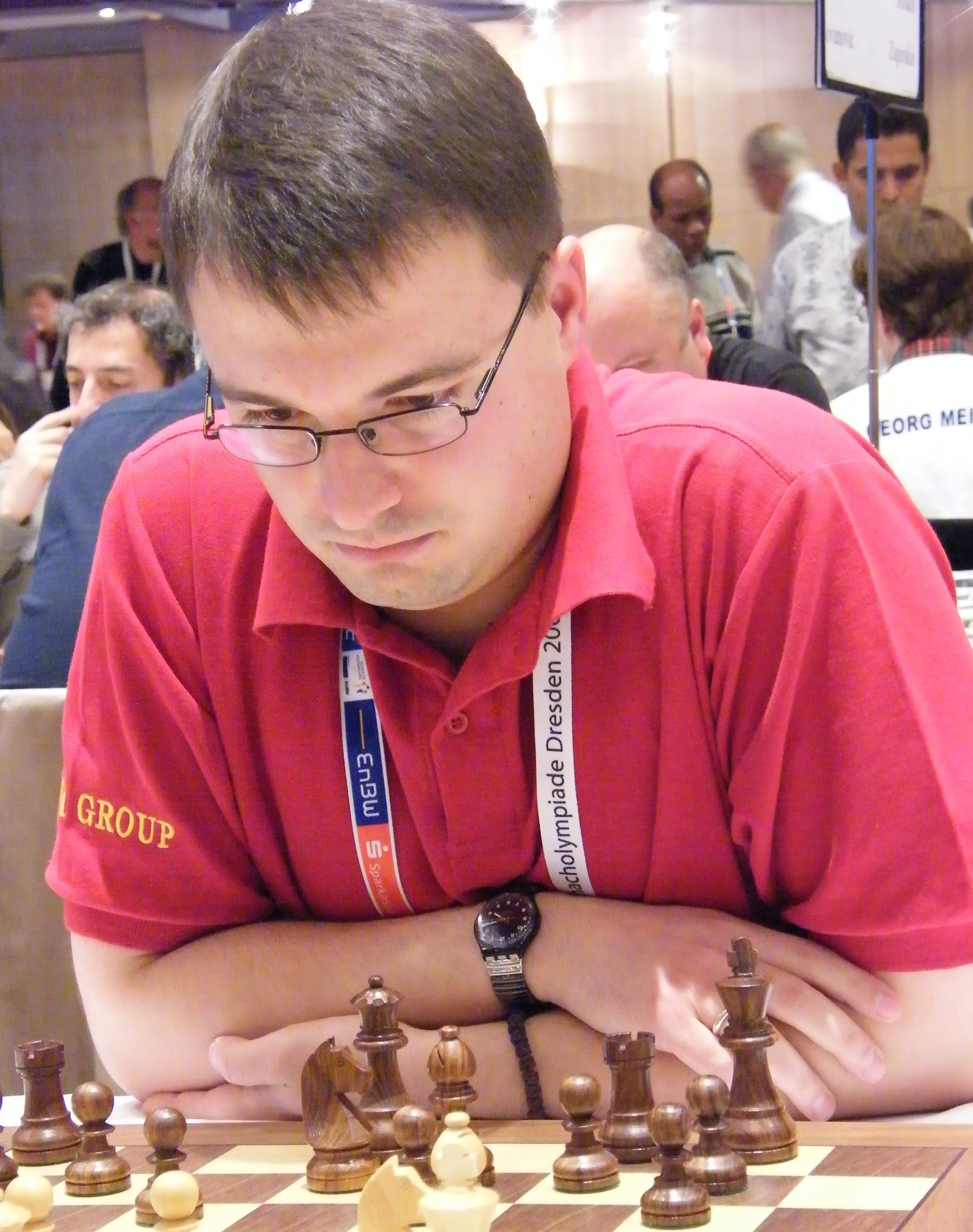

Personal information
- Born: September 12, 1980 (age 45) Belgrade, Serbia, FR Yugoslavia

Chess career
- Country: Serbia
- Title: Grandmaster (2001)
- FIDE rating: 2554 (July 2026)
- Peak rating: 2640 (May 2010)
- Peak ranking: No. 102 (May 2010)

Bojan Vučković (born 1980) is a Serbian chess Grandmaster. He is also strong chess problemist holding title of International solving grandmaster.
