= Norman Macleod (chess problemist) =

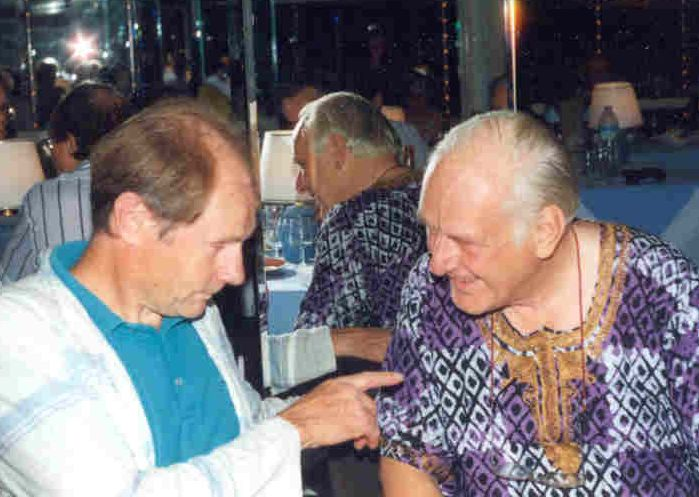
Norman Macleod (on the right with Bo Lindgren) in 1990 in Benidorm

Norman Alasdair Macleod (6 December 1927, in Glasgow – 2 October 1991) was a Scottish chess player and chess composer. He gained title Grandmaster of the FIDE for Chess Composition in 1993.

Norman Macleod
MAT, 1983, 1. prize

Position: a8 black king, d8 white knight, f8 black knight, a7 white pawn, h7 black pawn, b6 white bishop, e5 white pawn, h5 black rook, a4 black pawn, c4 black pawn, d4 white pawn, e4 white king, f4 white pawn, a3 black queen, b3 black pawn, d3 black pawn, e3 white pawn, a2 black rook, b2 white pawn, c2 black pawn, e2 white knight, h2 black pawn, e1 black bishop, h1 white bishop

Mate in 8 moves

Solution:
1. Kd5? c1Q! 2. Sxc1 Qxb2
1. Ke4-f3! Rh5-h4
2. Kf3-g2 d3xe2
3. Kg2-f3 c2-c1S
4. Kf3-e4 Rh4-h5
5. Ke4-d5 Qa3-b4
6. Kd5-c6 Qb4-e7
7. Kc6-b5+ Qe7-b7
8. Bh1xb7#
