= Michel Caillaud =

French chess problemist (born 1957)

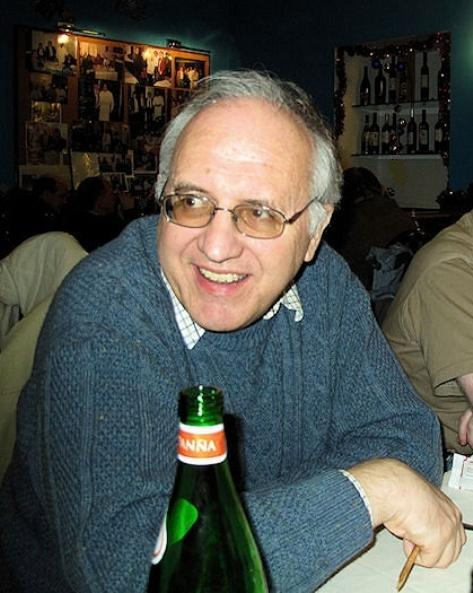

Michel Caillaud (born 10 April 1957) is a French chess problemist.

In 1993, Caillaud gained the title Grandmaster of the FIDE for Chess Compositions. At 36 years of age, he was the youngest GM for Chess Compositions. He has 200.92 points in FIDE Albums.

Caillaud twice won the World Chess Solving Championship: 1987 in Graz and 2000 in Pula. In 2002, he gained the title International Solving Grandmaster.

== Examples ==
Probleemblad, May/June 1999

Position: a8 black rook, c8 black bishop, d8 black queen, e8 black king, f8 black bishop, g8 black knight, a7 black pawn, b7 black pawn, d7 black pawn, e7 black pawn, f7 black pawn, g7 black pawn, h5 black pawn, a2 white pawn, e2 white pawn, f2 white pawn, g2 white pawn, h2 white pawn, a1 white rook, b1 white knight, c1 white bishop, d1 white queen, e1 white king, f1 white bishop, g1 white knight, h1 white rook

Position after White's 7th move. How did the game go? (2 solutions)
Comm. Andernach TT, 1993

Position: a8 black rook, b8 black knight, c8 black bishop, d8 black queen, e8 black king, f8 black bishop, g8 black knight, h8 black rook, a7 black pawn, b7 black pawn, c7 black pawn, e7 black pawn, f7 black pawn, g7 black pawn, h7 black pawn, a2 white pawn, b2 white pawn, c2 white pawn, d2 white pawn, e2 white pawn, f2 white pawn, g2 white pawn, h2 white pawn, a1 white rook, b1 white knight, c1 white bishop, d1 white queen, e1 white king, f1 white bishop, h1 white rook

SPG in 3.0 (Andernach chess)

Solutions

Proof game: 1.b4 h5 2.b5 Rh6 3.b6 Rc6 4.bxc7 Rxc2 5.cxb8=Q Rxd2 6.Qd6 Rxd1+ 7.Qxd1 or 1.b4 h5 2.b5 Rh6 3.b6 Rd6 4.bxc7 Rxd2 5.cxb8=B Rxc2 6.Bf4 Rxc1 7.Bxc1. This is the so-called Pronkin theme.

Second example:1.Nf3 Nc6 2.Ne5 Nxe5 3.Nxd7 Nb8.
