= Peter Gvozdják =

Slovak chess composer (born 1965)

Peter Gvozdják (born 16 November 1965) is a Slovak chess composer.

In 2000 Peter Gvozdják gained the title FIDE Solving Master, then in 2001 the title International Master of the FIDE for Chess Compositions and finally in 2012 the title Grandmaster of the FIDE for Chess Compositions

In the WCCI for years 2007–2009 Peter Gvozdják took silver medals in three sections: twomovers, threemovers and fairies.

Peter Gvozdják is one of world's leading expert for problems with cyclic shift of play when comparing two or more phases. He published two monographies on the subject, Cyclone covering years up to 2000 and Cyclone 2 covering years 2000–2009.
