= Michael Pfannkuche =

German chess player (born 1956)

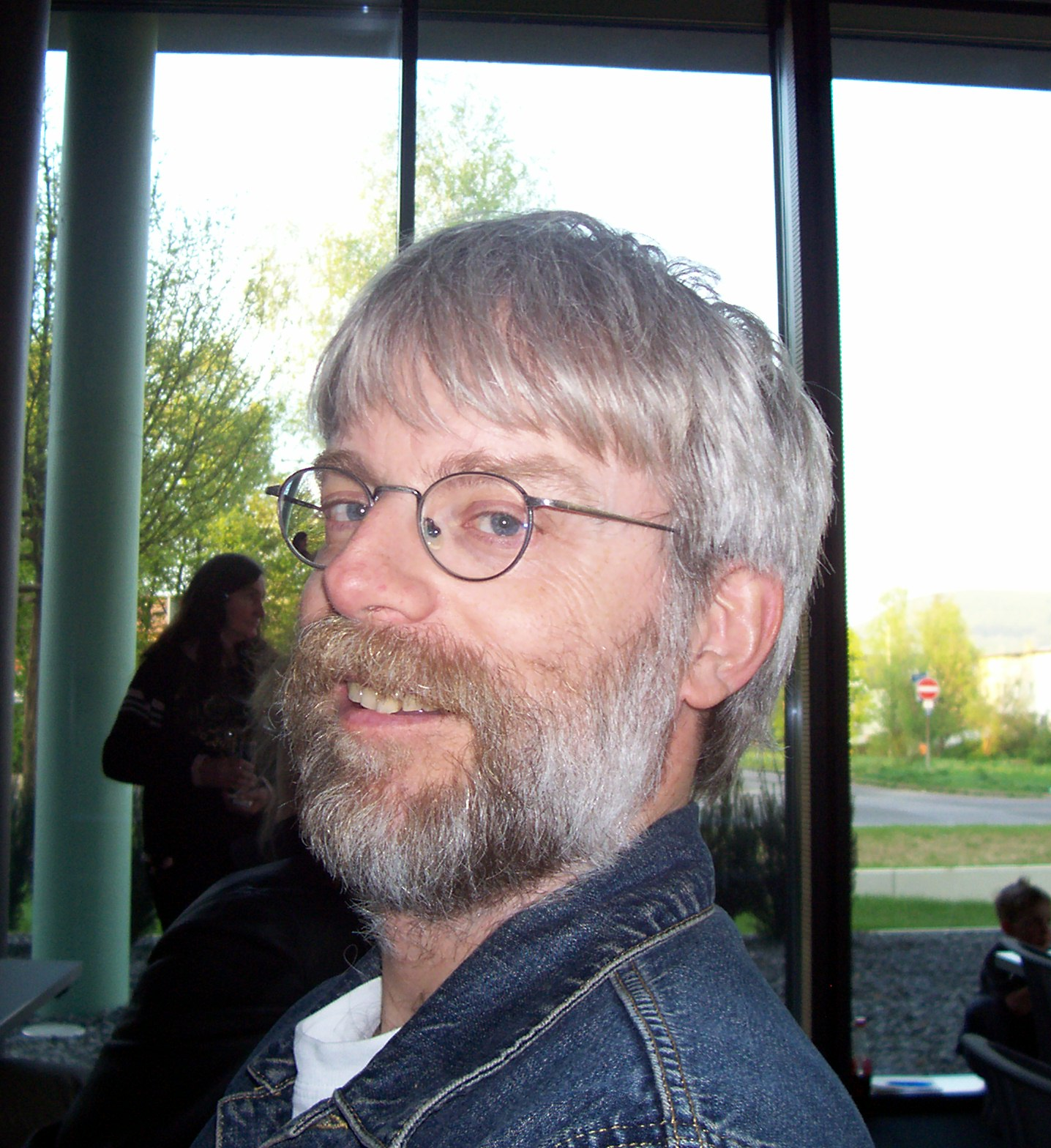

Personal information
- Born: September 1, 1956 (age 70) Münster, Germany

Chess career
- Country: Germany
- World Champion: World Chess Solving Champion (1988, 1993)

Michael Pfannkuche (born September 1, 1956) is a German chess problemist.

== Biography ==
Twice won the individual World Chess Solving Championship (1988, 1993). Five times won the team World Chess Solving Championships for Germany (1987, 1988, 1993, 2000, 2002). In 1993 he gained the title of International Solving Grandmaster.

Since 1970 Pfannkuche composed chess problems and managed chess magazine section of the composition. From 1970 to 1988 he participated in the German Chess Bundesliga, representing Münster town team.

In 1982 Pfannkuche graduated from the University of Münster but in 1988 defended his doctor's degree in mathematics. He worked as a systems programmer. He is married, and has five children.
