= Andrey Selivanov (chess player) =

Russian politician and chess composer (born 1967)

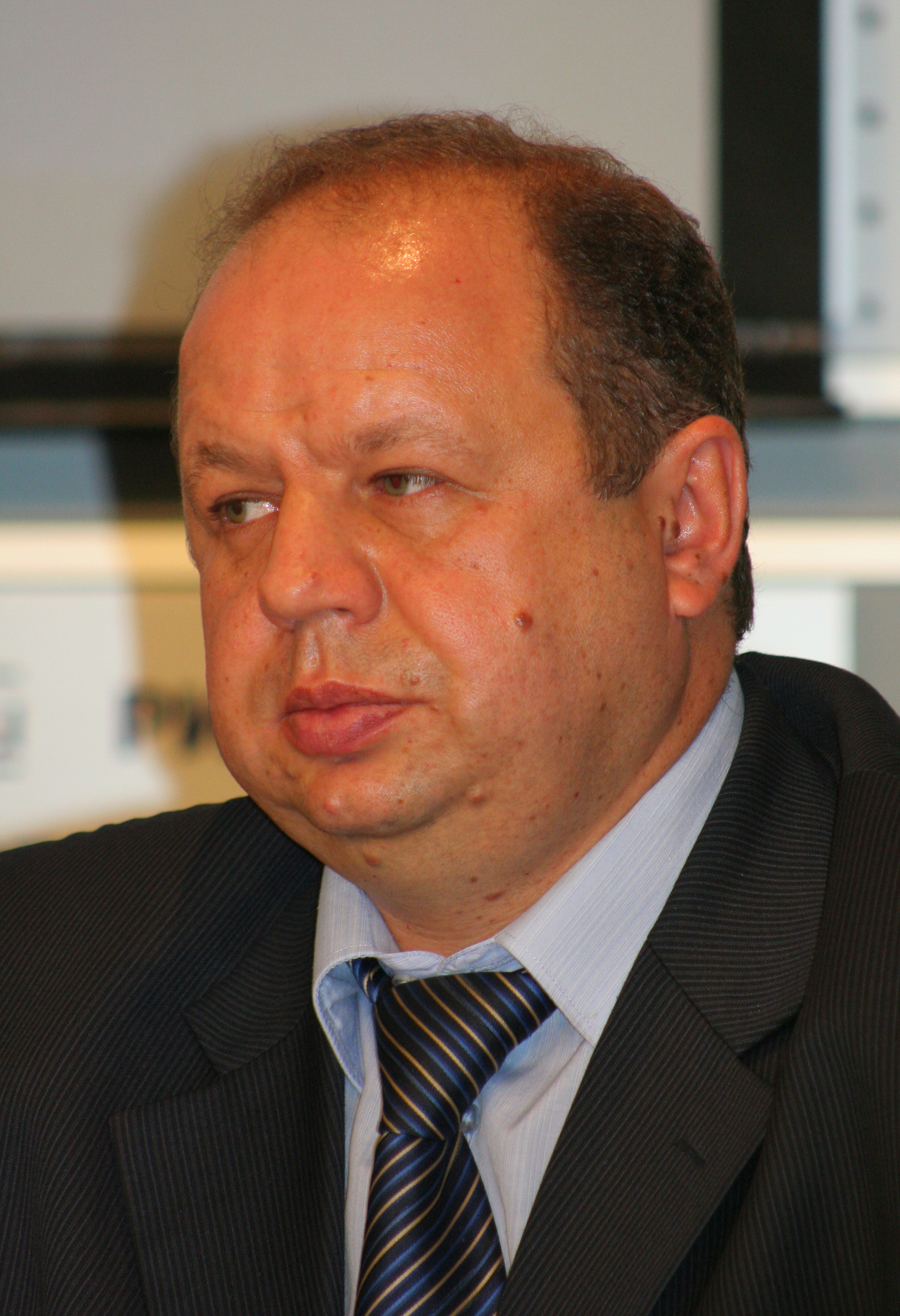

Personal information
- Born: July 9, 1967 (age 59) Karpinsk, Sverdlovsk Oblast, RSFSR, Soviet Union

Chess career
- Country: Russia
- World Champion: World Chess Solving Champion (2003)

Andrey Vladimirovich Selivanov (Russian: Андрей Владимирович Селиванов; born July 9, 1967) is a Soviet and Russian politician and chess problemist (also known as a chess composer). He was Russian State Duma deputy from 1993–2003.

== Biography ==
After secondary school and a professional technical school graduation, Selivanov worked in Komsomol local office (1987–1990). From 1990 to 1992, he was the newspaper's Заря Урала ("Ural Dawn") social department head. In 1990, Selivanov was elected as member of the Sverdlovsk region of Krasnoturinsk City Council. In this office, he worked until 1993, when he was elected as deputy of the Russian State Duma. In 1995 and 1999, Selivanov was re-elected by the Russian State Duma. In 1995 he graduated from the Ural State Law University. In 1994, Selivanov was elected as Vice President of the Russian Chess Federation. In 1997 he was elected as Russian Chess Federation president and the FIDE Vice President. Since 2013, Selivanov is the Russian Olympic Committee Executive Vice President.

In 2003, in Moscow, Selivanov won the individual and team World Chess Solving Championship. He also later twice won the World Chess Solving Championship in team classification. In 2008, Selivanov gained the title of International Solving Grandmaster. Selivanov is author of more than 850 chess problems and studies. He is an eight-time winner of the World Championship of Chess Composition: four times individually, and four times for the Russian team. In 2009, Selivanov gained the title of International Grandmaster for chess composition. He also is International Judge of Chess Compositions. Selivanov is editor of chess magazines Шахматная композиция ("Chess Composition") and Уральский проблемист ("Ural Problemist").

He is married and has three children.
