= Steffen Slumstrup Nielsen =

Danish chess composer (born 1975)

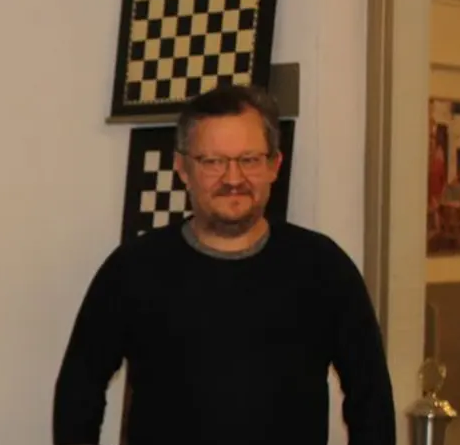
- Steffen Slumstrup Nielsen at the Danish National Championship of Chess Problem Solving in 2023

Personal information
- Born: 13 August 1975 (age 51) Aalborg, Denmark

Chess career
- Country: Denmark
- Peak rating: 2244 (April 2007)

Steffen Slumstrup Nielsen (born 13 August 1975) is a Danish chess player, chess composer, and journalist.

He was the 2019-2021 World Champion of Chess Composition in section D (Endgame Studies), while now holds the silver medal for the 2022-2024 edition.

Besides the world title, Nielsen has won several other prizes in chess composition, such as the 1° Prize on 2016 FIDE World Cup tournament and a 2011 tournament dedicated to GM Jan Timman's 60th birthday. In 2018, Nielsen won bronze medal at the World Championship.

His passion for chess began in his teenage years, and though he played at a decent amateur level, he found his calling in chess composition, which suits his family life better as it doesn't require extended absences.

Nielsen's tactical focus in chess is reflected in his compositions, where he often draws inspiration from dramatic games and blitz chess, finding beauty in complex, hanging positions. He is a specialist of crossed pin-unpin themes. His compositions are aimed also to expand the horizons of chess, challenging the notion that the game has been exhausted despite the finite number of pieces, and merging the endgame study world with the chess problems world, as stated in a comment shared on Serhiy Didukh's official blog.

In 2023, he obtained the title of FIDE Grandmaster for Chess Composition.

He is the co-author of the book Endgame Labyrinths.
