= Adolphe Alexandre Lesrel =

French painter (1839–1929)

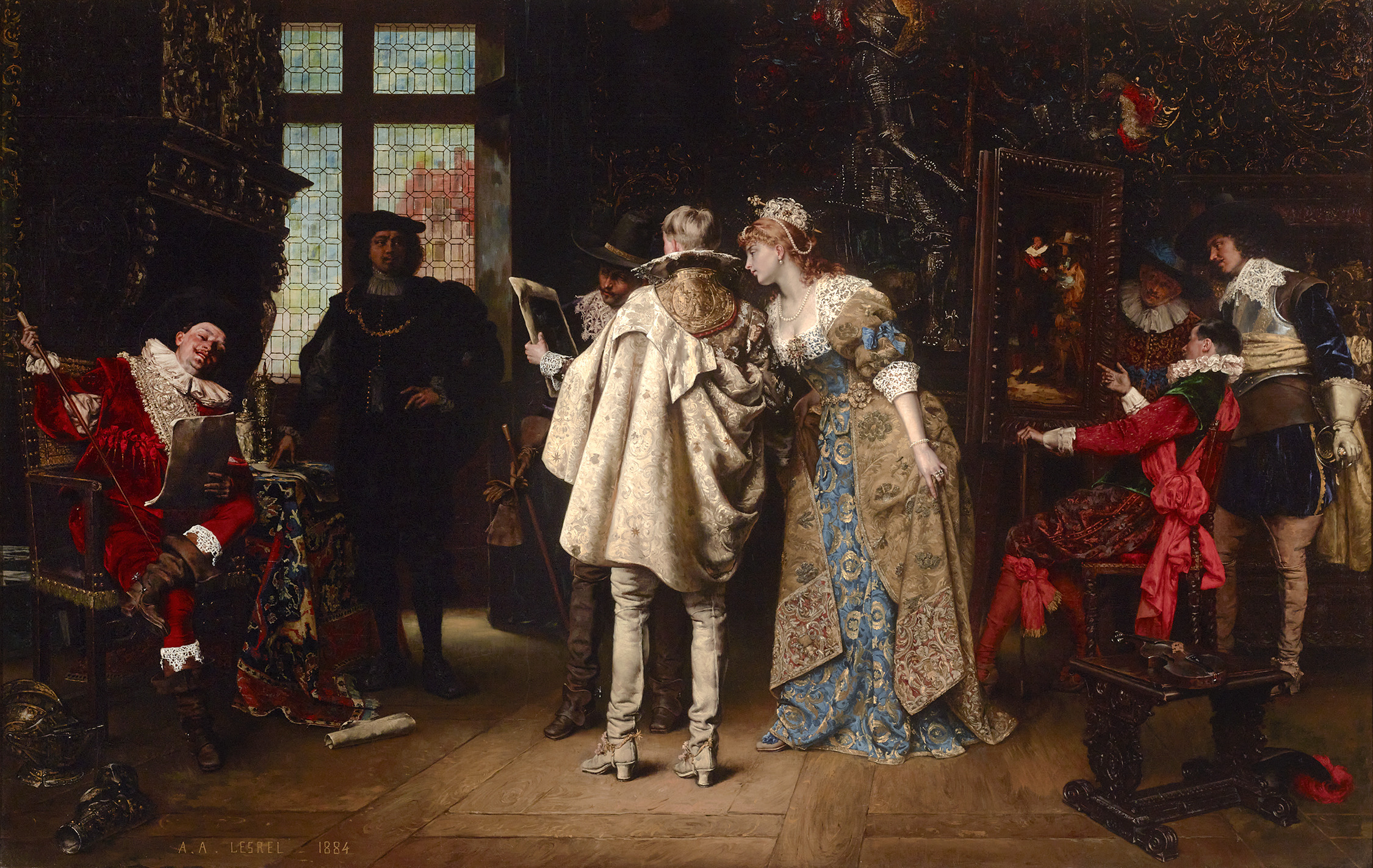
Seigneurs flamands visitant l'atelier de Rembrandt. Dated 1884.

Adolphe Alexandre Lesrel (19 May 1839 – 25 February 1929) was a French painter. He was born in Genêts and had his artistic training under Jean-Léon Gérôme, whose style he followed. His paintings are in the Musée des Beaux-Arts in Nantes and the Musée des Beaux-Arts in Rouen. He specialized in historical genre paintings. At a 2012 Sotheby's auction, one of his paintings, The Practice Recital, was sold for US$86,500.
