= Andernach chess =

Chess variant

Andernach chess is a chess variant in which a piece making a capture (except kings) changes colour. For instance, if a white bishop on a2 were to capture a black knight on g8, the result would be a black bishop on g8. Non-capturing moves are played as in orthodox chess. If a pawn captures on eighth rank, it is promoted first and then changes colour.

The game was named after the German town of Andernach, which is the site of annual meetings of fairy chess enthusiasts. It was during the 1993 meeting there that Andernach chess was introduced with a chess problem composing tournament for Andernach problems. It has since become a popular variant in problem composition, though it has not yet become popular as a game-playing variant.

== Example problem ==
Michel Caillaud
Comm. Andernach TT, 1993

Position: a8 black rook, b8 black knight, c8 black bishop, d8 black queen, e8 black king, f8 black bishop, g8 black knight, h8 black rook, a7 black pawn, b7 black pawn, c7 black pawn, e7 black pawn, f7 black pawn, g7 black pawn, h7 black pawn, a2 white pawn, b2 white pawn, c2 white pawn, d2 white pawn, e2 white pawn, f2 white pawn, g2 white pawn, h2 white pawn, a1 white rook, b1 white knight, c1 white bishop, d1 white queen, e1 white king, f1 white bishop, h1 white rook

Shortest proof game in 3.0 (Andernach chess)

An example Andernach chess problem is shown in the diagram. The task is to find a proof game, which would last three moves and lead to the position shown. The solution is:

1. Nf3 Nc6 2. Ne5 Nxe5(=wN)

The black knight turns into a white knight after capture on e5. White can now move this knight.

3. Nxd7(=bN)

This time a white knight turns into a black knight.

3... Nb8 (see diagram)

== Variations ==
The precursor of Andernach chess was Tibetan chess, in which the black units (called lamas) change colour and piece type when capturing white pieces of a different type. As in Andernach chess, the king is not affected by capture. For example, if a black pawn on d7 captures a white queen on c6, it becomes a white queen and can be moved by White on the next move. This game is not related to Chandraki, a chess variant that may have been played in Tibet.

A variant on Andernach chess is anti-Andernach, in which pieces except kings change colour after non-captures, but stay the same colour after a capture. There is also super-Andernach in which all pieces except kings change colour after every move, whether a capture or not. Super-Andernach was introduced by John Rice in The Problemist Supplement in March 2006.

== See also ==
- Martian chess
