= Pauli Perkonoja =

Finnish chess problemist (born 1941)

Personal information
- Born: Pauli Kalervo Perkonoja; July 19, 1941 (age 85) Tampere, Finland

Chess career
- Country: Finland
- World Champion: World Chess Solving Champion (1986, 1992, 1995)

Pauli Perkonoja (born July 19, 1941) is a Finnish chess problemist.

== Biography ==
Perkonoja was born in a suburb of Tampere, but after a few years moved to Turku, where he has lived all his life. He worked in the Finnish postal service. In his free time he is devoted crossword and chess study. Perkonoja is known as the chess problemist. He was one of Finland's chess problem magazine Tehtäväniekka authors.

In 1969 Perkonoja gained the title of International Master of the FIDE for Chess compositions. In 1982 he became the first chess player in the world, which has received the title of International Solving Grandmaster. Three times Perkonoja won the individual World Chess Solving Championship: 1986, 1992 and 1995. In 2005 in Legnica he won the first European Chess Solving Championship.
