= Roland Baier =

Swiss chess player and problemist (born 1954)

Personal information
- Born: August 11, 1954 (age 71)

Chess career
- Country: Switzerland
- World Champion: World Chess Solving Champion (1983)

Roland Baier (born August 11, 1954) is a Swiss chess problemist. In 1983 Baier won the first individual World Chess Solving Championship. In 1988 he gained the title of the International Solving Grandmaster. In 1989 he was awarded the FIDE title - International Arbiter of Chess Composition, but in 1992 he became FIDE Master of Chess Composition.
