= Rusinek =

Rusinek is a Polish surname derived from the name of an ethnicity, either Rusyns or Ruthenians. Archaic feminine forms: Rusinkowa (after husband), Rusinkówna (after father).

- Jan Rusinek (born 1950), Polish mathematician and chess composer
- Krzysztof Rusinek (born 1981) Polish footballer
- Michał Rusinek (literary critic) (born 1972), Polish literary critic and translator
- Michał Rusinek (writer) (1904–2001), Polish writer, poet, and dramatist

== See also ==
- Rosinek
