= Jorma Paavilainen =

Finnish chess player (born 1960)

Personal information
- Born: April 5, 1960 (age 66)

Chess career
- Country: Finland
- Title: FIDE Master (1990)
- World Champion: World Chess Solving Champion (2001)
- FIDE rating: 2305 (January 2007)
- Peak rating: 2340 (July 1994)

Jorma Paavilainen (born April 5, 1960) is a Finnish chess problemist.

== Biography ==
Twice (1983, 1985) played for Finland in World Youth U26 Team Chess Championships. In 1985 played for Finland second team in the Nordic Cup in chess. In later years regular played for Pori town team in Finnish Chess Championship I league. He is a FIDE Master (FM).

Paavilainen become best known as the chess problemist and chess problems solver. He is many times Finnish Chess Solving Championship winner: 1998, 2000, 2001, 2005, 2007, 2008, 2010 and 2011. In 1999 Paavilainen gained the title of International Solving Grandmaster. In 2001 in Wageningen he won the individual World Chess Solving Championship. In 2003 Paavilainen won silver medal in Belgium Open Chess Solving Championship. In 2006 he won silver medal in World Chess Solving Championship. Paavilainen is Finnish chess problem magazine Tehtäväniekka editor.
