= World Chess Solving Championship =

Annual chess puzzles competition

The World Chess Solving Championship (WCSC) is an annual competition in the solving of chess problems organized by the World Federation for Chess Composition (WFCC), previously by FIDE via the Permanent Commission of the FIDE for Chess Compositions (PCCC).

The participants must solve a series of different types of chess problem in a set amount of time. Points are awarded for correct solutions in the least time. The highest score at the end of the competition is proclaimed the winner.

== Format ==
The Tournament consists of six rounds over two days, with three rounds each day according to the following table:

- Round 1 – 3 twomovers 20 minutes solving time
- Round 2 – 3 threemovers 60 minutes solving time
- Round 3 – 3 endgame studies 100 minutes solving time
- Round 4 – 3 helpmates 50 minutes solving time
- Round 5 – 3 moremovers 80 minutes solving time
- Round 6 – 3 selfmates 50 minutes solving time

== Sections ==
- Team Championship – To qualify as an official team world championship, there must be at least seven teams from seven countries present. This section has grown from nine teams in 1977 to now averaging 20.
- Individual – Likewise, for an official individual world championship to take place, 30 solvers from at least 10 countries must participate. This number too has grown from 18 in 1977 to well over 70 in the past six years (as of 2007).
- Women and Juniors (up to 23 years old) – This event only requires 10 solvers from at least seven countries.

== Rating ==
=== Formulas ===
We assume that the tournament has n solvers, with ratings $R_i$ (i = 1, ..., n) and in the tournament their scores are $S_i$ (i = 1, ..., n).

- AveRat = average rating of the solvers
- AveSco = average score of the solvers
- VarRat = $\frac1n \sum_{i=1}^{n} (R_i - \mbox{AveRat})^2$
- Covar = covariance between ratings and scores = $(\frac1n \sum_{i=1}^{n} R_i S_i) - \mbox{AveRat} \cdot \mbox{AveSco}$
- Slope = $\frac\mbox{Covar}\mbox{VarRat}$
- Intercept = $\mbox{AveSco} - \mbox{Slope} \cdot \mbox{AveRat}$

For players who didn't already have a rating, a preliminary rating is calculated. This rating is determined at the end of the first tournament in which the solver has participated. The formula that is used to calculate this rating is:

- preliminary rating = $\frac{\mbox{Score of player} - \mbox{Intercept}}\mbox{Slope}$

For players who already have a rating, the new rating is calculated as follows.

- Rat = most recent rating of the solver
- ExpSco = $\mbox{Slope} \cdot \mbox{Rat} + \mbox{Intercept}$
- TC = tournament coefficient, a number between 1 and 4; when the tournament is stronger, the TC is higher
- ChangeRat = $\mbox{TC} \cdot (\mbox{Score of player} - \mbox{ExpScore})$
- NewRat = new rating = $\mbox{Rat} + \mbox{ChangeRat}$

These formulas are the defaults. If parameters fall outside a predetermined range, correction calculations are being carried out. These can be found in the reference.

=== Rating list in 2015 ===
October 1st 2015, Top 10:

1. GM Georgy Evseev (Russia) 2785
2. GM Kacper Piorun (Poland) 2744
3. GM Piotr Murdzia (Poland) 2742
4. GM John Nunn (United Kingdom) 2716
5. GM Ram Soffer (Israel) 2667
6. GM Eddy Van Beers (Belgium) 2632
7. GM Anatoly Mukoseev (Russia) 2631
8. GM Arno Zude (Germany) 2626
9. GM Jonathan Mestel (United Kingdom) 2595
10. GM Ofer Comay (Israel) 2594

=== Rating list in 2023 ===
July 1st 2023, Top 10:

1. GM Danila Pavlov (Russia) 2776
2. GM Georgy Evseev (Russia) 2747
3. Andrei Zhuravlev (Russia) 2683
4. GM Piotr Murdzia (Poland) 2661
5. GM Kacper Piorun (Poland) 2645
6. GM Eddy Van Beers (Belgium) 2636
7. GM John Nunn (United Kingdom) 2630
8. GM Ram Soffer (Israel) 2604
9. IM Ural Khasanov (Russia) 2602
10. Kevinas Kuznekovas (Lithuania) 2567

== Winners ==
=== Team competition ===
- 1977 – Finland
- 1978 – Finland
- 1979 – West Germany
- 1980 – Israel
- 1981 – Finland
- 1982 – Yugoslavia
- 1983 – Finland
- 1984 – Finland
- 1985 – Finland
- 1986 – Great Britain
- 1987 – West-Germany
- 1988 – West-Germany
- 1989 – Soviet Union
- 1990 – Great Britain and Soviet Union
- 1991 – Soviet Union
- 1992 – Russia
- 1993 – Germany
- 1994 – Germany
- 1995 – Finland
- 1996 – Israel
- 1997 – Israel
- 1998 – Israel
- 1999 – Russia
- 2000 – Germany
- 2001 – Israel
- 2002 – Germany
- 2003 – Russia
- 2004 – Israel
- 2005 – Great Britain
- 2006 – Great Britain
- 2007 – Great Britain
- 2008 – Russia
- 2009 – Poland
- 2010 – Poland
- 2011 – Poland
- 2012 – Poland
- 2013 – Poland
- 2014 – Poland
- 2015 – Poland
- 2016 – Poland
- 2017 – Poland
- 2018 – Poland
- 2019 – Poland
- 2021 – Russia
- 2022 – Poland
- 2023 – Poland
- 2024 – Great Britain
- 2025 – Poland
- 2026 – Germany

=== Individual competition ===
- 1983 – Roland Baier (Switzerland)
- 1984 – Kari Valtonen (Finland)
- 1985 – Ofer Comay (Israel)
- 1986 – Pauli Perkonoja (Finland)
- 1987 – Michel Caillaud (France)
- 1988 – Michael Pfannkuche (Germany)
- 1989 – Georgy Evseev (USSR)
- 1990 – Georgy Evseev (USSR)
- 1991 – Georgy Evseev (USSR)
- 1992 – Pauli Perkonoja (Finland)
- 1993 – Michael Pfannkuche (Germany)
- 1994 – Arno Zude (Germany)
- 1995 – Pauli Perkonoja (Finland)
- 1996 – Noam Elkies (Israel)
- 1997 – Jonathan Mestel (Great Britain)
- 1998 – Georgy Evseev (Russia)
- 1999 – Ofer Comay (Israel)
- 2000 – Michel Caillaud (France)
- 2001 – Jorma Paavilainen (Finland)
- 2002 – Piotr Murdzia (Poland)
- 2003 – Andrey Selivanov (Russia)
- 2004 – John Nunn (Great Britain)
- 2005 – Piotr Murdzia (Poland)
- 2006 – Piotr Murdzia (Poland)
- 2007 – John Nunn (Great Britain)
- 2008 – Piotr Murdzia (Poland)
- 2009 – Piotr Murdzia (Poland)
- 2010 – John Nunn (Great Britain)
- 2011 – Kacper Piorun (Poland)
- 2012 – Piotr Murdzia (Poland)
- 2013 – Piotr Murdzia (Poland)
- 2014 – Kacper Piorun (Poland)
- 2015 – Kacper Piorun (Poland)
- 2016 – Kacper Piorun (Poland)
- 2017 – Kacper Piorun (Poland)
- 2018 – Piotr Murdzia (Poland)
- 2019 – Piotr Górski (Poland)
- 2021 – Danila Pavlov (Russia)
- 2022 – Danila Pavlov (Russia)
- 2023 – Danila Pavlov (Russia)
- 2024 – Kacper Piorun (Poland)
- 2025 – Piotr Murdzia (Poland)
- 2026 – Danila Pavlov (Russia)
