= Martin Minski =

German composer of chess endgame studies (born 1969)

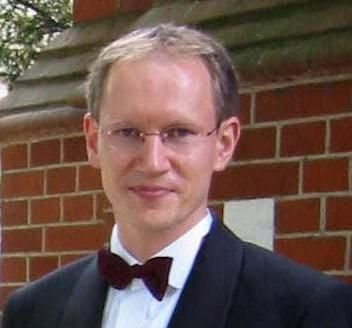
Martin Minski

Martin Minski (born 23 August 1969) is a German composer of chess endgame studies. His compositions are predominantly of tactical nature and often have surprising visual effects. His studies have won competitions numerous times; among his most notable are the second-place finishes at the World Championship of Chess Composition (behind Oleg Pervakov) and at the FIDE World Cup for Chess Composition 2019 (behind Sergiy Didukh).

In 2020, Minski has been appointed Grandmaster of chess composition and is the first German chess composer devoted exclusively to endgame studies to merit that distinction.

Minski lives in Berlin and works as a mathematics teacher.
