= Ram Soffer =

Israeli chess grandmaster (born 1965)

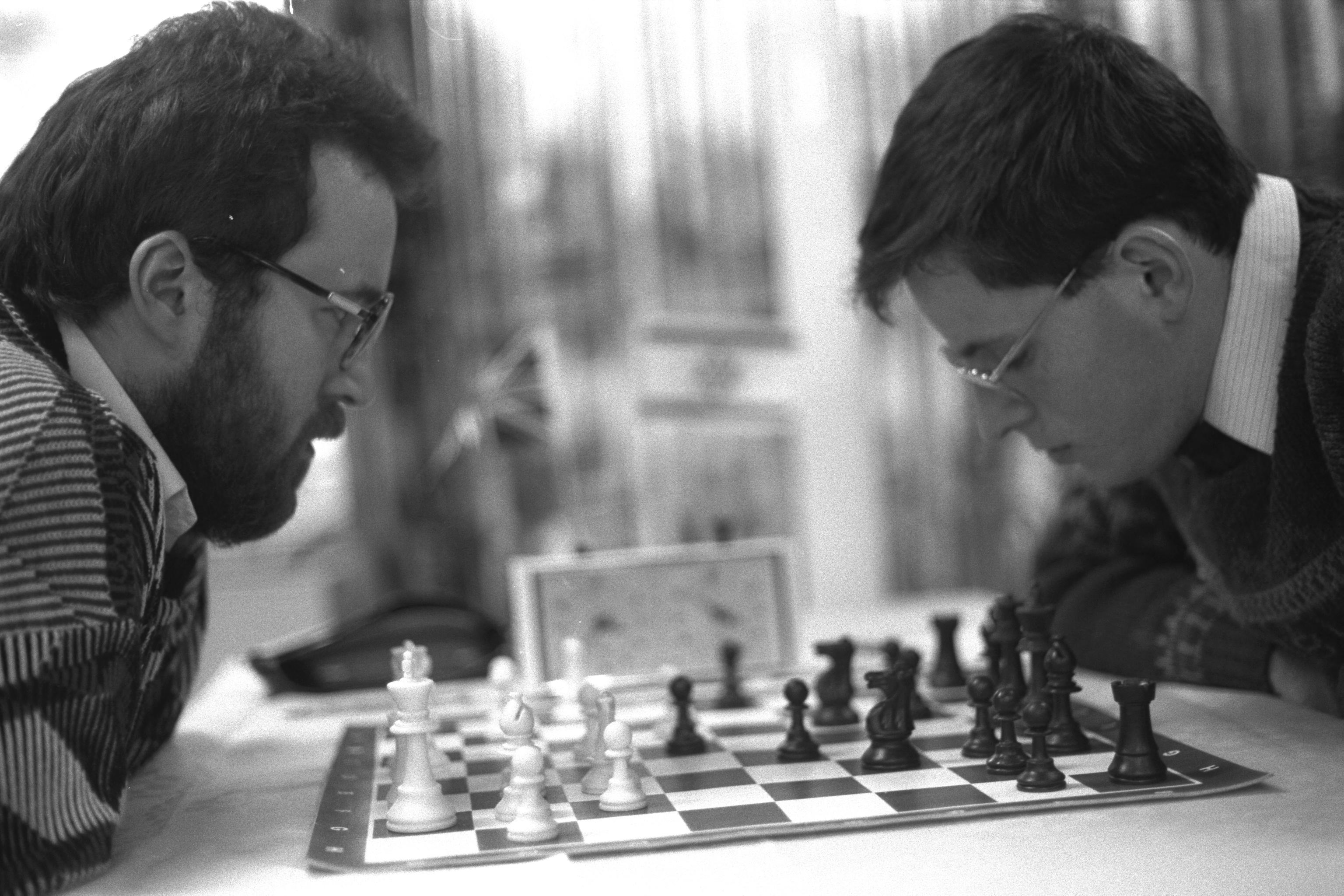

Personal information
- Native name: רם סופר
- Born: 6 September 1965 (age 60) Ramat Gan, Tel Aviv District

Chess career
- Country: Israel
- Title: Grandmaster (1994)
- FIDE rating: 2426 (July 2026)
- Peak rating: 2535 (January 1995)

Ram Soffer (Hebrew: רם סופר; born 6 September 1965) is an Israeli chess grandmaster. He was awarded the title Grandmaster by FIDE in 1994. He is also a grandmaster in chess problem solving since 1998.

Soffer played on team Israel which won the 2016 European Senior Team Chess Championships in the 50+ division. He also played for Israel in the 2017 World Senior Team Chess Championship, where his team finished https://players.chessbase.com/picture/Sof09102
