= Arno Zude =

German chess player and problemist (born 1964)

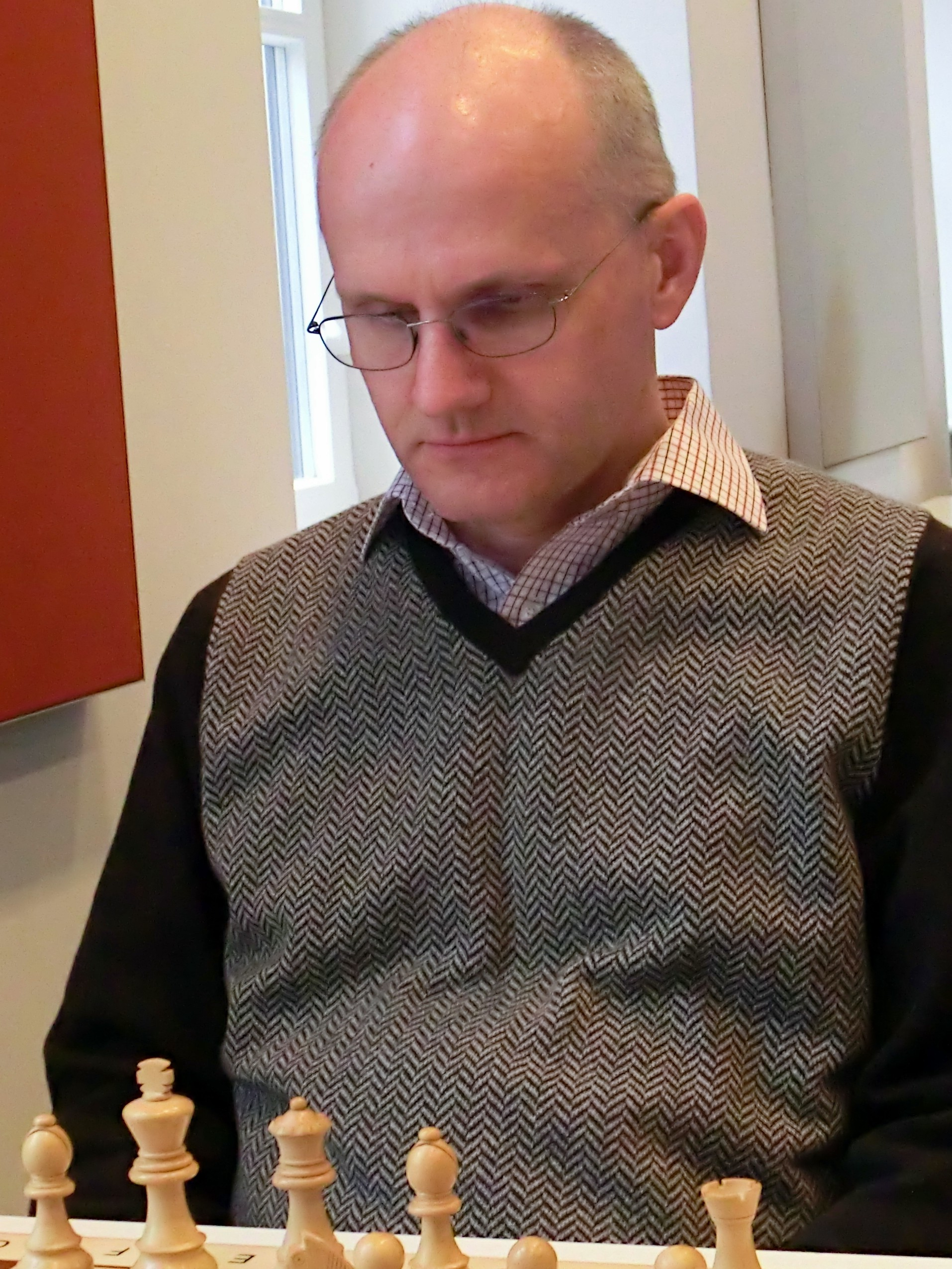

Personal information
- Born: May 24, 1964 (age 62)

Chess career
- Country: Germany
- Title: International Master (1995)
- World Champion: World Chess Solving Champion (1994)
- Peak rating: 2475 (April 2009)

Arno Zude (born 24 May 1964) is a German chess International Master and chess problemist.

== Biography ==
Zude has won the German Chess Solving Championship several times (1983, 1985, 1986, 1988, 1989, 1990, 1991, 1992, 1993, 1994, 1998, 1999, 2001, 2007, and 2013). In 1993 Zude gained the title of International Solving Grandmaster. In 1994 he won the individual World Chess Solving Championship in Belfort.

Zude is a three-time winner of the Hesse federal state chess championship (1986, 1992, and 1994). In the 1995 German Chess Championship he finished in second place (behind Christopher Lutz). In 1995 Zude became a FIDE International Master. He regularly participated in the German Chess Bundesliga, which represented the SV Hofheim (with interruptions from 1984 to 2005) and PSV Duisburg (1997–2000) teams.

For his achievements in chess, on 7 December 2005 Zude received the highest sports award in Germany: Silbernes Lorbeerblatt.
