= Alexander Gerbstmann =

Russian chess composer (1900–1982)

Alexander Iosifovich Gerbstman (Russian: Александр Иосифович Гербстман; 10 April 1900 – 22 May 1982), also transliterated as Herbstman, was a Russian and Soviet chess composer and endgame study author.

== Biography ==
Gerbstman spent his youth in Weggis, Switzerland, where he learned to play chess. After moving to Moscow, he studied at the Higher Institute of Literature and Art. During his studies, he began composing chess problems and endgame studies. In 1924, while working for the editorial board of Shakhmaty v SSSR, he was introduced by Nikolai Grekov to Vasily Platov, who instructed him in study composition. That same year, Gerbstman met Nikolai Grigoriev, with whom he maintained a close friendship until Grigoriev fell ill in 1938.

During a study trip to Leningrad in 1934, Gerbstman met Alexey Troitsky and Leonid Kubbel, later collaborating with Troitsky on a study book. At the outbreak of World War II in 1941, Gerbstman attempted to persuade Troitsky to leave Leningrad, but Troitsky remained and died of starvation during the Siege of Leningrad. Gerbstman's efforts to place Leonid Kubbel on the last train out of Leningrad also failed, as Kubbel refused to leave behind his brother Yevgeny. Both Yevgeny and Leonid Kubbel died during the Siege of Leningrad; their brother Arvid Kubbel had died earlier in a Siberian Gulag and was posthumously rehabilitated during the Khrushchev Thaw.

These friendships significantly influenced Gerbstman's development as a composer. In 1959, he became one of the first six people—and alongside André Chéron, one of the first two endgame study composers—to be awarded the title of International Master for Chess Composition. He was also an International Judge for Chess Composition.

In 1979, Gerbstman emigrated to Sweden with his wife and daughter. He was the last known chess composer to have personally known the Platov brothers, Nikolai Grigoriev, Alexey Troitsky, and the Kubbel brothers.

== Works ==
Gerbstman composed approximately 350 endgame studies, about 150 of which received prizes in competitions. He authored ten books in Russian, four of which were translated into Dutch and two into German.

Selected books in German include:

- Das Geheimnis des schwarzen Königs ("The Secret of the Black King"), Sportverlag Berlin, 1960.
