= Kari Valtonen =

Finnish chess problemist (born 1954)

Personal information
- Born: April 26, 1954 (age 72)

Chess career
- Country: Finland
- World Champion: World Chess Solving Champion (1984)

Kari Valtonen (born April 26, 1954) is a Finnish chess problemist.

== Biography ==
Valtonen is chess problemist who worked in several genres, including endgame study, helpmate and selfmate. He was one of Finland's chess problem magazine Tehtäväniekka authors. In 1984 in Sarajevo Valtonen won the second individual World Chess Solving Championship. In the same year he gained the title of International Solving Grandmaster. He also is FIDE International Arbiter of Chess Composition. In 2004 Valtonen was the chief judge of chess composition's international tournament in honor of his fifty-year anniversary.
