= Ofer Comay =

Israeli science writer

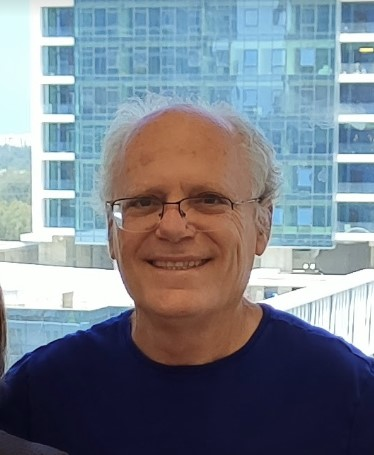

Personal information
- Native name: עופר קומיי
- Born: 1957 (age 68–69)

Chess career
- Country: Israel
- World Champion: World Chess Solving Champion (1985, 1999)

Ofer Comay (Hebrew: עופר קומיי; born 1957) is an Israeli chess problemist and a popular science writer who challenged the Standard Model of particle physics.

== Biography and chess career ==
At school years Comay won the Israeli Olympiad for Youth in mathematics organized by Weizmann Institute of Science. He graduated from the Tel Aviv University with a master's degree in mathematics. Along with his father, Eliyahu Comay, he founded a software company which specializes in document image understanding.

In 1985 Comay first time won the individual World Chess Solving Championship. In 1986 he gained the title of International Solving Grandmaster. In 1999 Comay second time won the individual World Chess Solving Championship. His hobby is to compose chess problems and mathematical riddles.

== Challenging the Standard Model of particle physics ==
Comay wrote popular science books about particle physics, which were based on the work of his father, Eliyahu Comay, an Israeli physicist.

In 2014 he published the book Science or Fiction? which provides more than 20 phenomena which, according to the book, challenge Quantum Chromodynamics, one of the cornerstones of particle physics.
