= Proof game =

Retrograde analysis chess problem

A proof game is a type of retrograde analysis chess problem. The solver must construct a game starting from the initial chess position, which ends with a given position (thus proving that that position is reachable) after a specified number of moves. A proof game is called a shortest proof game if no shorter solution exists. In this case the task is simply to construct a shortest possible game ending with the given position.

When published, shortest proof games will normally present the solver with a diagram - which is the final position to be reached - and a caption such as "SPG in 9.0". "SPG" here is short for "shortest proof game" and the "9.0" indicates how many moves must be played to reach the position; 9.0 means the position is reached after black's ninth move, 7.5 would mean the position is reached after seven and a half moves (that is, after white's eighth move) and so on. Sometimes the caption may be more verbose, for example "Position after white's seventh move. How did the game go?".

Most published SPGs will have only one solution: not only must the moves in the solution be unique, their order must also be unique. They can present quite a strong challenge to the solver, especially as assumptions which might be made from a glance at the initial position often turn out to be incorrect. For example, a piece apparently standing on its initial square may turn out to actually be a promoted pawn (this is known as the Pronkin theme). There are some proofgames which have more than one solution, and the number of solutions is then given in the stipulation. The majority of SPGs have a solution from about six to about thirty moves, although examples with unique solutions more than fifty moves long have been devised.

A number of chess problem composers have specialised in SPGs, with one of the most notable examples being Michel Caillaud who did much to popularise the genre in the 1970s and 1980s.

== Example problems ==
Ernest Clement Mortimer
(version by A. Frolkin),
Shortest Proof Games, 1991

Position: a8 black rook, b8 black knight, c8 black bishop, d8 black queen, e8 black king, f8 black bishop, h8 black rook, a7 black pawn, b7 black pawn, c7 black pawn, f7 black pawn, g7 black pawn, h7 black pawn, a2 white pawn, b2 white pawn, c2 white pawn, d2 white pawn, e2 white pawn, f2 white pawn, g2 white pawn, h2 white pawn, a1 white rook, b1 white knight, c1 white bishop, d1 white queen, e1 white king, f1 white bishop, h1 white rook

Shortest proof game in 4.0
Michel Caillaud,
Probleemblad, May/June 1999

Position: a8 black rook, c8 black bishop, d8 black queen, e8 black king, f8 black bishop, g8 black knight, a7 black pawn, b7 black pawn, d7 black pawn, e7 black pawn, f7 black pawn, g7 black pawn, h5 black pawn, a2 white pawn, e2 white pawn, f2 white pawn, g2 white pawn, h2 white pawn, a1 white rook, b1 white knight, c1 white bishop, d1 white queen, e1 white king, f1 white bishop, g1 white knight, h1 white rook

Position after White's 7th move. How did the game go? (2 solutions)

A relatively simple example is given to the right. It is a version by Andrei Frolkin of a problem by Ernest Clement Mortimer, and was published in Shortest Proof Games (1991). It is an SPG in 4.0. It is natural to assume that the solution will involve the white knight leaving g1, capturing the d7 and e7 pawns and the g8 knight, and then being captured itself, but in fact the solution carries an element of paradox quite common in SPGs: it is the knight that started on b8 that has been captured and the knight now on that square has come from g8. The solution (the only possible way to reach the position after four moves) is 1. Nf3 e5 2. Nxe5 Ne7 3. Nxd7 Nec6 4. Nxb8 Nxb8.

A more complex proofgame, with more solutions, can be seen in the second diagram. The solutions are: 1. b4 h5 2. b5 Rh6 3. b6 Rc6 4. bxc7 Rxc2 5. cxb8=Q Rxd2 6. Qd6 Rxd1 7. Qxd1 and 3. ... Rd6 4. bxc7 Rxd2 5. cxb8=B Rxc2 6. Bbf4 Rxc1 7. Bxc1, showing the Pronkin theme in both solutions (in the first solution with a queen, in the second solution with a bishop).

== Variations ==
There are a number of variations on SPGs. The problem may carry a stipulation similar to "Find a game with 8.b7-b8=N mate", which simply means a game must be constructed starting from the initial position and ending on the given move number with the given move. Or it may be a one-sided proof game, in which only white makes moves (this is the SPG analogue to the seriesmover in other types of chess problems). An alternative rule-set may also be specified (such as circe chess or losing chess), or a fairy piece may be substituted for an orthodox piece.

An SPG-type problem is to find the shortest game in which White's and Black's corresponding moves are mirror images of each other. Possible solutions are 1. d4 d5 2. Qd3 Qd6 3. Qh3 Qh6 4. Qxc8#, 1. d4 d5 2. Qd3 Qd6 3. Qf5 Qf4 4. Qxc8#, and 1. c4 c5 2. Qa4 Qa5 3. Qc6 Qc3 4. Qxc8#.

== See also ==
- Retrograde analysis
