= Bo Lindgren =

Swedish chess grandmaster

Bo Waldemar Lindgren (26 February 1927 – 4 June 2011) was a Swedish Grandmaster and chess composer. He was awarded the grandmaster title in 1980.
