= Comins Mansfield =

English chess problem composer

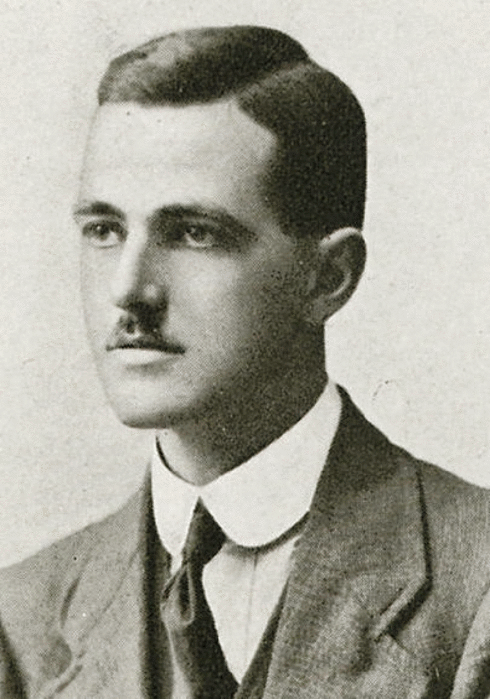
Comins Mansfield in his twenties

Comins Mansfield MBE (14 June 1896 – 27 March 1984) was an English chess problem composer. He gained the title International Grandmaster for chess compositions in 1972 and 94.33 points in the FIDE Album.

Mansfield was born in the village of Witheridge, near Tiverton in Devon, England, the son of Herbert John Mansfield, who had long played correspondence chess for Devon. He attended Blundell's School in Tiverton and there began to take an interest in the game. He was inspired by a 1910 article in the British Chess Magazine that contained chess problems, and soon won first prize for a two-mover published in a Plymouth newspaper. The Chess Devon reference states that "... the family does not appear anywhere in the 1901 census." This is incorrect. The family is in the 1901 census: Public Record Office reference RG13/2140, page 8/9. They were living in South Street, Witheridge.

After leaving school, he joined the tobacco company W. D. & H. O. Wills, which remained his employer for 45 years, firstly in Bristol and later in Glasgow. While still in Bristol, he won the Gloucestershire county chess championship every year from 1927 to 1934. In 1936, Alain C. White published A Genius of the Two-Mover, which included 100 of the 300-or-so problems that Mansfield had composed over the past 20 years; and, in 1944, White also published Mansfield's Adventures in Composition – The Art of the Two Move Chess Problem in a limited edition. This book was re-published in the UK in 1948.

When Mansfield retired from Wills in around 1960, he moved to Paignton, Devon. He became FIDE's first International Master for Chess Compositions in 1959, becoming President of FIDE's Problem Commission in 1964. In 1964 he took over as the Sunday Telegraph's chess columnist and retained that post until 1978. He was made International Grandmaster FIDE in 1972 and was awarded the MBE for his services to chess in 1976.
