= Marjan Kovačević =

Serbian chess problemist (born 1957)

Marjan Kovačević (born 8 April 1957) is a Serbian chess problemist.

In 1988 Kovačević gained the title International Solving Grandmaster. In 2007 Kovačević gained the title Grandmaster of the FIDE for Chess Compositions.

== Examples ==
Marjan Kovačević
Serbian Championship 2003–2006, 1. pr.

Position: a8 black bishop, a7 white bishop, b7 white bishop, e6 black pawn, a5 white king, c5 white knight, h5 black queen, a4 white queen, b4 white knight, d4 black king, a2 white pawn, d2 black bishop, e2 white rook, f2 black knight, c1 white rook

Mate in two moves

Solution 1. Ka5-b5! (threat 2. Rc1-c4 mate)
1. ... Qh5xc5+ 2. Ba7xc5#
1. ... Qh5-e8+ 2. Nc5-d7#
1. ... Qh5xe2+ 2. Nc5-d3#
1. ... Qh5-d5 2. Nb4-c6#
1. ... Nf2-e4 2. Re2xe4#
1. ... Bd2-c3 2. Nb4-c2#
1. ... Bd2xc1 2. Nb4-d5#
1. ... Bd2-e3 2. Nb4-d3#
