= Franz Pachl =

German chess player

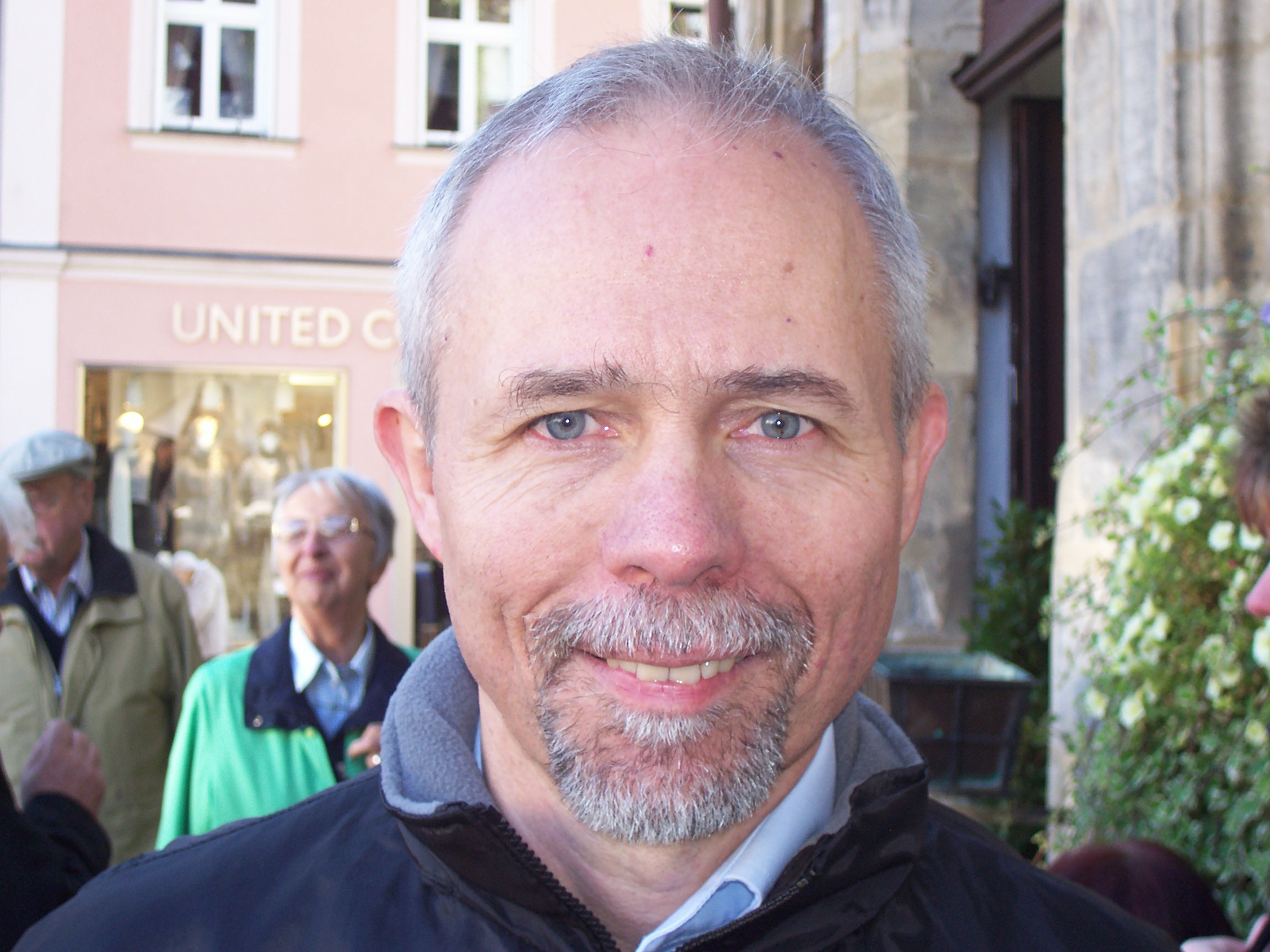
Franz Pachl (October 2007)

Franz Pachl (born 8 January 1951) is a German chess grandmaster of the FIDE. He was also German champion of minigolf.

== Early life ==
Pachl was born in Ludwigshafen am Rhein. While he played correspondence chess in 1975, he subscribed to the magazine Schach-Echo. Schach-Echo's problem column interested Pachl in chess composition.

== Chess ==
At a problem solver's meeting in Ludwigshafen in 1975, he met Hermann Weißauer. Weißauer mentored Pachl, teaching him about chess composition while helping him publish his first problem, a twomover, in 1976. He specialized in twomovers and helpmates. In 1988, when Pachl and Markus Manhardt became acquainted, he became interested in fairy chess.

As of December 2005, he had published around 848 compositions (364 helpmates, 269 twomovers and 163 fairy problems), winning 193 prizes, 186 honorable mentions and 139 commendations. More than 300 compositions were co-productions.

Pachl became International master of the FIDE for chess composition in 1989. The Grandmaster title was awarded in September 2005. He is an international judge of the FIDE for twomovers and helpmates.

He wrote a book about chess composition in 1999.

== Minigolf ==
In his youth, Pachl played table tennis in a club. In 1973 he started playing minigolf, becoming German champion and in 1981 and 1982 vice champion (single). He won the team title six times.

== Personal life ==
Pachl is the oldest child in has family among three siblings. For more than 30 years he worked as a clerk (merchant) at BASF. He is married and has a son.

== Sources ==
- Hermann Weißauer: Franz Pachl & Udo Degener, Problem-Forum special issue December 2005
