= Chess title =

Title bestowed on a chess player

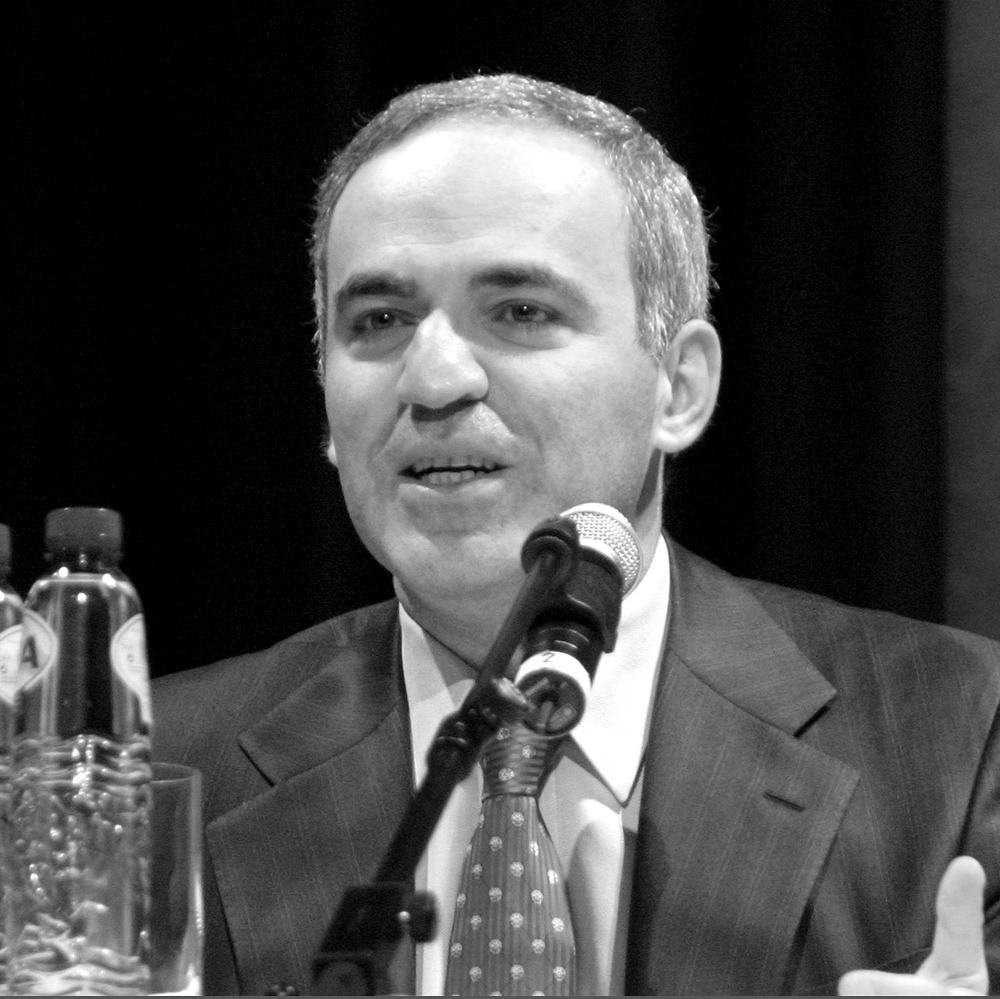
Grandmaster Garry Kasparov (2007)

A chess title is a title regulated by a chess governing body and bestowed upon players based on their performance and rank. Such titles are usually granted for life, though they may be revoked. The international chess governing body FIDE grants several titles, the most prestigious of which is Grandmaster; many national chess federations also grant titles such as National Master. More broadly, the term "master" can refer to any highly skilled chess player.

== Over-the-board chess ==
In general, a chess master is a player of such skill that they can usually beat most amateurs. Among chess players, the term is often abbreviated to master.

The establishment of the world chess body, Fédération Internationale des Échecs (FIDE), saw the creation of titles superior to the "national master" titles. In 1950, FIDE created the titles "Grandmaster" and "International Master", the requirements for which were increasingly formalized over the years. In 1978, FIDE created the lesser title of "FIDE Master".

=== Early use of the master title ===
From the beginning of recorded chess, to the establishment of the first chess organizations, the term master was applied informally, being simply a matter of popular acclaim. Strong players demonstrated their strength in play, and gained the informal reputation of being chess masters.

As chess became more widespread in the latter half of the 19th century, the term began to be given out by organizations. One of the most prestigious events of the time was the DSB Congress, first organised by the Deutscher Schachbund (German Chess Federation) in 1876. The DSB's standard for the title of Master was the Meisterdrittel, i.e. to win at least one third of the games in the premiere tournament at a DSB Congress. The winner of the Hauptturnier or "reserve" event was entitled to compete in the premiere event in the next congress, with a chance to achieve the Meisterdrittel.

=== FIDE titles ===
- Grandmaster (GM) is the highest title a chess player can attain. The usual way for a player to qualify for the Grandmaster title is by achieving a FIDE rating of 2500 at one time and three favorable results in tournaments (called norms) involving other Grandmasters, including some from countries other than the applicant's.
- International Master (IM). Requires a minimum rating of 2400 and three norms, while the requirements of achieving a norm are lowered compared to the GM title.
- FIDE Master (FM). Requires a minimum rating of 2300. No norms are required.
- Candidate Master (CM). Requires a minimum rating of 2200. No norms are required.

The titles listed above are open to men and women. Separate women-only titles are available:

- Woman Grandmaster (WGM) Requires a minimum rating of 2300 and three norms.
- Woman International Master (WIM) Requires a minimum rating of 2200 and three norms, while the requirements of achieving a norm are lowered compared to the WGM title.
- Woman FIDE Master (WFM) Requires a minimum rating of 2100. No norms are required.
- Woman Candidate Master (WCM) Requires a minimum rating of 2000. No norms are required.

Beginning with Nona Gaprindashvili in 1978, 44 women have also earned the GM title.

For every above title, there are alternative ways of attaining it by performing at or near the top of certain high-level tournaments. For example, the GM title is awarded to the person winning the World Junior Championship.

FIDE also awards titles for "lower-band" players, regardless of gender, through the FIDE Online Arena:

- Arena Grandmaster (AGM). Requires a minimum online FIDE rating of 2000.
- Arena International Master (AIM). Requires a minimum online FIDE rating of 1700.
- Arena FIDE Master (AFM). Requires a minimum online FIDE rating of 1400.
- Arena Candidate Master (ACM). Requires a minimum online FIDE rating of 1100.

There are no norms required for any of the arena titles, however the player must maintain a FIDE online rating of at least the minimum required for at least 150 bullet games, 100 blitz games or 50 rapid games consecutively.

FIDE also awards titles for arbiters, study composers, and trainers.

=== National titles ===
Some national chess federations award titles such as "National Master" (NM). National chess federations are free to set whatever standards they want for such titles, which are not recognized by FIDE. Standards for "Master" titles in different countries vary, but are usually based on criteria such as achieving a certain rating (typically about 2200 Elo), achieving the required number of tournament performances ("norms") at a certain level, or featuring prominently in the country's national championship. In some cases, it may extend to honorary titles awarded to (for example) prominent chess administrators, business patrons or politicians. Since the introduction of the FIDE Master (FM) title in 1978, some federations such as those of Ireland and Germany have ceased awarding National Master titles, apparently regarding them as obsolete.

==== Soviet Union ====
In the Soviet Union, the Master title was conferred by the federal government and was connected to the title of Master of Sport. The first chess player to receive the title was Peter Romanovsky in 1934. Only players who featured prominently in the Soviet Chess Championship were considered for the title, and fewer than 100 awards were made altogether. The majority of these players also qualified for the FIDE International Master or Grandmaster title.

==== United States ====
The USCF currently gives a national title for achieving a 2200 rating (master):

Title	Rating
Senior Master	2400
Life Master	2300
Master	2200
Candidate Master	2000
1st Category	1800
2nd Category	1600
3rd Category	1400
4th Category	1200

===== Expert =====
USCF rating categories
Category	Rating range
Senior Master	Over 2400
National Master	Over 2200
Expert	2000–2199
Class A	1800–1999
Class B	1600–1799
Class C	1400–1599
Class D	1200–1399
Class E	1000–1199
Class F	800–999
Class G	600–799
Class H	450–599
Class I	200–449
Class J	under 200

Chess expert is a title given by the United States Chess Federation (USCF). It is awarded to chess players rated from 2000 to 2199. Players rated above that are masters, while players below that are class players. Approximately 50,000 chess players have USCF ratings, of which approximately 2,500 are rated 2000 or better. Thus, chess experts are in the top 5% of all USCF tournament chess players. Since 2008, USCF has also awarded Candidate Master titles to players that achieve five performance-based 'norms' in tournaments and also hold a rating above 2000. Like the title of Master, Candidate Master titles are awarded for life.

The title of chess expert is not awarded for life. Every time a tournament chess player plays a game, their rating goes up or down depending on the game's outcome and on how strong their opponent is. If the rating of a chess expert falls below 2000, they are not a chess expert any more (though they retain the title of Candidate Master, if it was earned according to the criteria above). This is in contrast to international titles awarded by FIDE, which are awarded for life. In European countries the term "expert" is not used. Instead, players of that level are called "Candidate Masters", although the FIDE Candidate Master title generally requires a higher rating (2200 FIDE).

It is possible (and common), however, for players in the United States to have a rating that places them in the 'expert' category while still retaining the title of 'Life Master' or 'National Master'. The title of 'master' is awarded to anyone meeting the criteria laid down by the USCF, including having once been rated over 2200. Like the FIDE titles of FIDE Master, International Master, and Grandmaster, the title of 'Master' is awarded for life. Players with a rating below 2200, but who have earned the title of 'National Master' or 'Life Master', are, according to the USCF, still referred to as 'masters'.

The first USCF rating list was published in December 1950. On that list, experts were players rated from 2100 to 2300 and masters were players rated from 2300 to 2500. However, within a few years, it was discovered that the ratings were rapidly deflating. As a result, the classifications were dropped by 100 points so that since then experts were rated between 2000 and 2200. In 1960, the USCF adopted the new Elo rating system replacing the original Harkness System. There have been continuous adjustments to that system ever since, with the primary purpose of stabilizing the rating system against the forces of inflation and deflation, so that a chess expert today will be approximately the same strength as a chess expert was twenty or forty years ago.

This information stated here also applies in Canada, under the auspices of the Canadian Federation of Chess (CFC), with one difference being that Class E encompasses all players rated under 1200. Similar class distinctions may apply in other national chess federations as well.

===== Master =====
The United States Chess Federation (USCF) awards the Title of National Master to anyone who achieves a USCF rating of 2200, and the title of Senior Master to anyone who achieves a USCF rating of 2400 along with certain performance-based 'norms' during tournament play. The USCF also awards the Life Master title to anyone who holds a 2200 rating for a total of 300 or more games in his or her lifetime.

In the United States, the title of "National Master" is awarded for life, regardless of whether the rating of a National Master subsequently goes below 2200. In August 2002, this position was codified (after being recognized as the existing status quo) by the USCF Policy Board with the passage of a motion stating "Any USCF member who has had a regular post tournament rating of 2200 or higher (published or not) has demonstrated a significant level of chess ability and is recognized by being automatically awarded the lifetime title of National Master."

===== Life Master =====
Life Master is a chess title awarded by the United States Chess Federation (USCF). To be awarded this title, one must hold a master's rating of over 2200 for at least 300 USCF-rated tournament chess games.

During the 1990s, the USCF also awarded a "Life Master" title on the basis of a different and more complex system that was similar to the FIDE 'norm system' of awarding titles. This method of attaining Life Master became officially recognized by the USCF on January 1, 1996. The "class norm" system was later discontinued, and players who had or were subsequently granted the title on the 300-game basis were renamed "Original Life Masters." In practice, the distinction is rarely made. Original Life Masters had to play 300 games as a Master without going below 2200 in their rating or the count would start over again.

As the name of this title implies, this title is held for life, regardless of any subsequent decrease in rating. Thus, it is possible to have a player with a USCF rating of 2000 (or below) who is a Life Master, although this is uncommon for 'Original Life Masters' (since such a rating floor can only be dropped by the USCF itself), who have a floor rating of 2200. It is more common for players who obtained the Life Master title through the now-defunct norm system, which did not require a rating of over 2200 to earn the title.

==== Canada ====
The Chess Federation of Canada awards the title of National Master to players who achieve a national rating of 2200, and three tournament performances ("norms") of 2300 or more. It also awards National Woman Master and National Candidate Master titles at 2000 rating, with three norms of 2100 or more.

==== England ====
The English Chess Federation awards the title of National Master to players who achieve an ECF rating of 2200, standard play. The player must maintain an average listed rating at, or above, the minimum rating for a period of 12 months, with a total game count of 30 games or more in the 12-month qualifying period. It also awards a number of lesser titles.

==== Ireland ====
Up until 1991, the Irish Chess Federation awarded the title of Irish National Master to 15 players. The title has since fallen into disuse.

==== Australia ====
The title of Australian Master was introduced in 1959, and was awarded by the Australian Chess Federation using a points based system, in which players were required to score 100 points from performances in major tournaments such as the Australian Chess Championship and state championships. According to Australian chess player and arbiter Shaun Press, the requirements were changed to a rating-based system some time during the 1980s, but the title was not held in high regard and is no longer awarded.

==== New Zealand ====
The New Zealand Chess Federation awards the title of National Master using a points-based system, based on performances in the New Zealand Chess Championship and a few other tournaments. 100 points are required for the title of National Master, and 40 points for the title of Candidate Master. As of 31 January 2013, 22 players hold the National Master title, the majority of whom also have FIDE titles.

==== Dominican Republic ====
The Dominican Chess Federation awards the title of National Master, based on performances in the Dominican Chess Championship. As of 11 April 2023, 7 players hold the National Master title, the majority of whom also have FIDE titles.

==== Finland ====
Finnish Chess Federation awards the title of National Master, if a player achieves a national rating of 2200. It is enough that a player achieves this rating mid tournament, even if the player manages to not get 2200 rating at the end of the tournament. As of July 2026 there are 358 National Masters in Finland.

== Chess compositions ==
Just as in over-the-board play, in problem chess the titles International Grandmaster, International Master and FIDE Master are awarded by FIDE via the PCCC (Permanent Commission for Chess Composition) for especially distinguished problem and study composers and solvers. (Unlike in over-the-board chess, however, there are no women-only equivalents to these titles in problem chess.)

=== Composers ===
For composition, the title of Grandmaster for chess composition was established in 1959, with André Cheron, Arnoldo Ellerman, Alexander Gerbstmann, Jan Hartong, and Cyril Kipping being the first honorary recipients. In subsequent years, qualification for the IM title, as well as for the GM title (first awarded in 1972 to Genrikh Kasparyan, Lev Loshinsky, Comins Mansfield, and Eeltje Visserman) and the FM title (first awarded 1990) has been determined on the basis of the number of problems or studies a composer had selected for publication in the FIDE Albums. These albums are collections of the best problems and studies composed in a particular three-year period, as selected by FIDE-appointed judges. Each problem published in an album is worth 1 point; each study is worth 1 2/3; joint compositions are worth the same divided by the number of composers. For the FIDE Master title, a composer must accumulate 12 points; for the International Master title, 25 points are needed; and for the Grandmaster title, a composer must have 70 points.

=== Solvers ===
For solvers, the GM (International Solving Grandmaster) and IM titles were both first awarded in 1982; the FM title followed in 1997. GM and IM titles can only be gained by participating in the official World Chess Solving Championship (WCSC): to become a GM, a solver must score at least 90 percent of the winner's points and on each occasion finish in at least tenth place three times within ten successive WCSCs. For the IM title they must score at least 80 percent of the winner's points and each time finish in at least fifteenth place twice within five successive WCSCs; alternatively, winning a single WCSC or scoring as many points as the winner in a single WCSC will earn the IM title. For the FM title, the solver must score at least 75 percent of the winner's points and each time finish within the top 40 percent of participants in any two PCCC-approved solving competitions.

=== Judges ===
The title International Judge of Chess Compositions is given to individuals considered capable of judging composing tournaments at the highest level.

== Correspondence chess ==
The International Correspondence Chess Federation (ICCF) awards the titles International Master, Senior International Master and International Correspondence Chess Grandmaster—these are equivalent to similar titles awarded by FIDE for over-the-board chess. The ICCF also runs the World Correspondence Chess Championships. Because these events can last a long time, they may overlap: for instance, in February 2005 Joop van Oosterom was declared winner of the eighteenth Championship (which began in June 2003), though the winner of the seventeenth Championship (which began in March 2002) had not yet been determined.

== See also ==
- FIDE titles
- International Correspondence Chess Federation § Titles
