= Daniele Guglielmo Gatti =

Italian chess composer (born 1987)

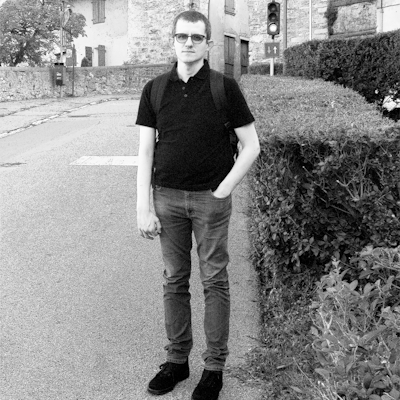

Personal information
- Born: 6 November 1987 (age 38) Tradate, Northern Italy

Chess career
- Country: Italy
- Peak rating: 1824
Medal record
Italian Chess Composition Championship
Gold medal – first place	5° Edition 2019–2021
Bronze medal – third place	4° Edition 2016–2018

Daniele Guglielmo Gatti (born 6 November 1987) is an Italian chess problems and chess studies composer.

== Biography ==
He began composing chess problems in 2015, initially focusing on selfmates and then exploring other genres, including endgame studies. In early 2025, he published an endgame study that achieved a complete Babson task (4/4) in a legal and economic setting. This has been considered one of the most difficult unsolved challenges in chess composition since its original formulation by American chess composer Joseph Ney Babson in 1884.

In 2025, Gatti also publicly disclosed his diagnosys of Asperger's Syndrome and intellectual giftedness, explaining how these conditions have influenced his work in the field of chess composition, especially through hyperfocus and pattern recognition.

Gatti is a registered nurse and lives on the Southern Dolomites.

== Development of the Babson study ==
In the past, building a correct chess problem showing the task in a sound and legal setting was considered extremely difficult or even impossible, although some composers in the end succeeded (but none of them achieved the theme in a perfect form, without duals in mainlines and also in sidelines). However, the feasibility of the task in form of a classic endgame study was still completely unknown.

Gatti's study was developed from a scheme created by Israeli-American International FIDE Master for chess composition Gady Costeff, which showed a complete Babson task theme in an endgame study setting, but in an illegal position and with presence of promoted pieces (three white Knights on the board). The scheme had originally been created in 2011, and Costeff spent over a decade, working in secret, attempting to construct a legal version. In his 2024 article on EG, he acknowledged the illegality of the position but chose to publish it as a demonstration, inviting other composers to explore possible improvements. Costeff declaration was: "The position is unreachable by a single capture. For example, if Ph2 could start on g3, the position would be reachable. I composed this [setting] in 2011 and tried for a decade to make it legal. The pleasure of 45 years of research and learning is far more dear to me than any publication honours. I do not care at all if the study is left out of the award for being illegal. I do think it is interesting and readers would be interested in how a Babson may look."

After having seen Costeff's scheme, Gatti began working independently on the same theme and, after approximately 45 days, published a sound Babson task in EG n. 239 (January 2025). The study was dedicated to Gady Costeff, who was acknowledged as a source of inspiration and a pioneer of the research in the field.

In his article, directly following the editorial on EG, Gatti wrote: "When I saw the diagram, I had what you might call an intuition. I understood that creating this incredible task was possible. I didn’t know how yet, but I knew that it would become an obsession for me. The Babson Task had always fascinated me, as every task in chess problem always did and always will (especially promotion tasks and Allumwandlung forms!), and now that I saw it so apparently close to being fully realized, I decided that I would focus all my energy on achieving it, no matter how much time or personal resources I would have to spent. Gady's words to me, impressed in my memory, were: “The easiest path to know if a legal Babson exists is to compose one!”"

There is a historical precedent for this story, namely the long, unsuccessful attempts by French composer Pierre Drumare to obtain a Babson Task in the form of a directmate problem. After more than twenty years, he managed to create a sound but illegal position, and shortly thereafter abandoned the idea, claiming that the Babson Task would have never been solved as a directmate in a satisfactory setting. Just an year later, Leonid Yarosh succeeded in obtaining the theme in a directmate problem, with a legal and economical position, for the first time in history.

Gatti later published on "Sinfonie Scacchistiche", an Italian magazine dedited to chess problems and studies, an article where he explains the challenges encountered, the method of work adopted and also shows the most significant failed attempts during the composition process, until the outcome.

== Reception and criticism ==
Following its publication, the study was featured on various national and international platforms, such as official chess news websites, specialized literature, as well as reposts on chess blogs, thematic discussion forums, podcasts and social networks.

=== Reactions from chess composition community ===
Gatti, EG n. 239 (2025)

Inspired by and dedicated to Gady Costeff
Black to move – White wins Complete solution in the Babson task page

Position: g8 black knight, e7 black pawn, h7 white pawn, e6 black pawn, g6 black knight, h6 black king, a5 black queen, b5 white knight, c5 white pawn, g5 white knight, a4 black pawn, c4 white king, d4 white pawn, g4 white pawn, a3 white pawn, d3 white pawn, e3 white bishop, a2 white pawn, e2 black pawn, f2 black pawn, g2 black pawn, e1 white rook, g1 white rook, h1 black bishop

Ukrainian chess critic, International FIDE Master for chess composition and former WCCI World Champion Serhiy Didukh referred to it literally as a "chess miracle" in his website "Chess Study Art". He later included the study in his digital book "100 Memorable Studies", published on the same site.

The study also received recognition by Harold van der Heijden, which praised the study as an "incredible achievement", and by former WCCI World Champion Steffen Slumstrup Nielsen.

Werner Keym, a German chess composer, chess writer and expert in problems showing castling, en passant capture and pawn promotion, also praised it with the words "incredible achievement" in his book "Problem Chess Art – A Subjective Anthology", writing on the description of the solution: "Perhaps the study of the century?"

German GM and FIDE Master for chess composition Jan Michael Sprenger contributed a comment on Didukh's website, describing it as "a rather elegant position given the complexity of the task.", remarking on the speed of its realization.

Dutch endgame studies composer Martin van Essen also analyzed the study during a masterclass directed at the Schaakvereniging Paul Keres club in Utrecht, later publishing the entire video on YouTube. A similar lecture was held in Belgrade from the Serbian composer Branislav Djurasevic, immediately after the study's publication, for the students of the Chess Academy of the Belgrade Chess Club.

Norwegian IM and FIDE Master for chess composition Geir Sune Tallaksen Østmoe also commented the realization of the study, writing that "the impossible task proved possible" in a post on X.

=== Reactions from OTB chess players ===
Outside the composition community, the study was featured by Austrian GM and National Champion Felix Blohberger in an instructional YouTube video, and by Armenian Super-GM Levon Aronian, who left a brief video comment on his Instagram page about the topic.

=== Controversials ===
Some discussion was raised regarding the initial stipulation of the study. While the Babson Task traditionally begins with White to move, the study in question starts with Black to move, and some composers pointed out that this does not configure a true Babson Task. This choice, while uncommon, is however legally permissible in endgame studies field. About the topic, Harold van der Heijden noted: “The composer also indicated that it is a pity that the study starts with BTM. When you put the wK on c3, the only move is 1.Kc4. Steffen advised that BTM is a lesser problem than wK in check in the initial position, and I fully agree."

== Chess composition career ==
In 2018, following the achievement of the required standard (PReMO system), Gatti received the title of National Master of Chess Composition from the independent organism "Associazione Problemistica Italiana", affiliated with the Italian Chess Federation.

In 2022, he participated in the 11th World Team Championship for chess composition (WCCT), achieving a 19th individual placement in section F (Selfmates), the best Italian placement for that edition.

In 2024, after having reached 3^{rd} position in the previous edition held in 2020, he won the 5^{th} Italian Chess Composition Championship.

In 2024, one of his original studies was selected and presented by Judit Polgar at the 'Global Chess Festival', held in Budapest on 17 September, for the project 'Chess Artistry Adventure', organized in memory of GM and chess composer Pal Benko.

He is FIDE International Judge of Chess Compositions since July 2025.

As of 2026, Gatti realized around 1000 chess compositions (650 problems and 350 endgame studies), receiving a total of 230 awards in national and international tournaments. To celebrate his first ten years of activity in the chess composition field, he organized and judged a dedicated Anniversary Tourney, publishing at the same time a free E-Book in English language, titled "Computational Monasticism".

== Publications ==
- "Professione Problemista – Avvicinamento alla composizione scacchistica" (Messaggerie Scacchistiche – 2022).
- "Computational Monasticism - Research Notes from a Homemade Large-Scale Selfmate Verification Project" (Independent free E-Book - 2026)
