= Jan Rusinek =

Polish chess composer (born 1950)

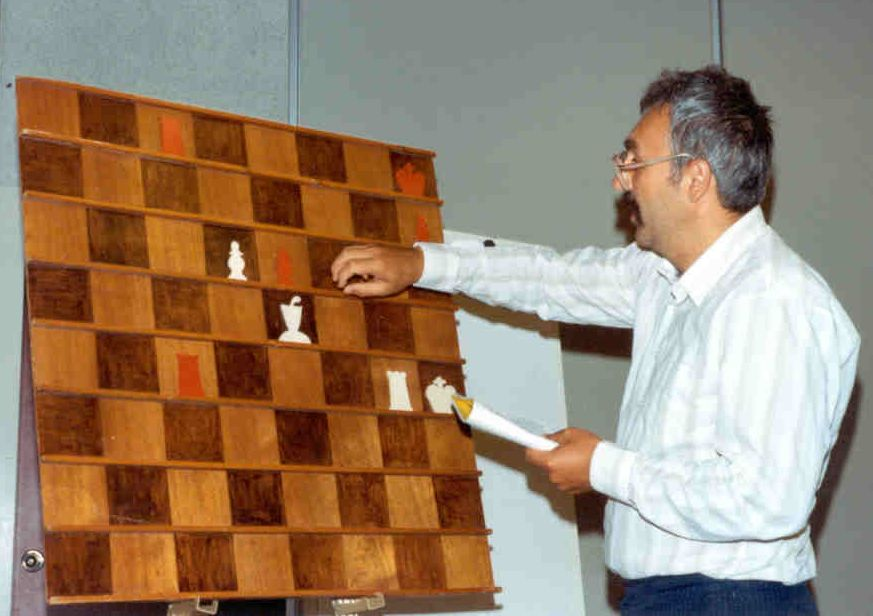
Jan Rusinek in 1991

Jan Rusinek (born 2 December 1950) is a Polish mathematician and chess composer, particularly noted for his brilliant endgame studies.

He was editor of the study section of Szachy (Chess) from 1971 to the magazine's closure in 1990. Rusinek became an International Judge of chess composition in 1983, and a Grandmaster of chess composition in 1992. He won over 30 first prizes in composing tourneys. The Oxford Companion to Chess opines that "his achievements are likely to rival those of his greatest predecessors".

== Endgame studies ==
Jan Rusinek
First Prize, New Statesman, 1971

Position: c8 white king, c7 white pawn, d7 black knight, e7 black king, g7 white pawn, a6 white pawn, b6 white pawn, c4 black bishop, c3 black knight

White to move and draw

To the left is one of Rusinek's better known studies. Black threatens Nb5-d6# or Ne4-d6# and 1.Kb7 Bd5+ does not help, so 1.a7 is necessary. Now 1...Bd5 can be answered with, among other lines, 2.g8Q Bxg8 3.a8Q Nxb6+ 4.Kb7 Nxa8 5.Kxa8 Be6 6.Kb8 and Black must give up a piece for the c pawn, so instead 1...Ba6+ 2.b7. Now 2...Nb5 threatens 3...Nd6# but is met with 3.g8N+ Ke8 4.Nf6+ when 4...Nxf6 loses to 5.a8Q. Instead, therefore, Black plays 2...Ne4 3.g8N+! Ke8 4.Nf6+ and now 4...Nexf6 is possible. This seems to put White in a dilemma, since 5.a8Q loses to 5...Nd5 with 6...Ne7# next move. But instead there is 5.a8B!! when 5...Nd5 is stalemate, so therefore 5...Ne5 6.Kb8 Nc6+ 7.Kc8 Bf1 and again White has a problem because 8.b8Q will lose to 8...Ba6+ 9.Qb7 Ne4 10.Qxa6 Nd6#. 8.b8N is no better: 8...Ne7+ 9.Kb7 Bg2+ 10.Ka7 (10.Nc6 Bxc6+ 11.Ka7 Bd7) 10...Nc8+ 11.Ka6 Bxa8. However, white can draw with a third underpromotion: 8.b8R!!. Now after 8...Ba6+ 9.Rb7, 9...Ne4 is stalemate, and there is no useful way for Black to avoid this. White draws.

Position: a8 white bishop, c8 white king, e8 black king, b7 white rook, c7 white pawn, a6 black bishop, c6 black knight, f6 black knight

Final position

White's being required to make all three underpromotions in order to draw is exceptionally unusual. In Endgame Magic (Batsford, 1996), John Beasley and Timothy Whitworth comment that it "represents a very much greater feat of composition than might at first appear. That it was accomplished with the use of only nine men adds still more to the composer's achievement." Beasley and Whitworth also comment that "It is quite easy to construct a position in which White must promote to a rook or bishop in order to avoid giving stalemate," but "It is much more difficult to create a position in which White must underpromote to create a stalemate," which is done on two occasions in this study.

Jan Rusinek
64, 1978

Position: c8 white king, f8 black king, c7 white pawn, d7 black knight, h7 white pawn, a6 white pawn, b6 white pawn, g6 white pawn, h6 white pawn, c4 black bishop, d4 black queen, c3 black knight

White to move and draw

Rusinek subsequently (64, 27 July 1978) added an introduction to this study which added a promotion to queen to the already existing underpromotions, thus creating an Allumwandlung. This later version is shown to the right. 1.h8R+ is insufficient, since 1...Ke7 will mate quickly. 1.h8Q+ is therefore necessary, and after the forced continuation 1...Qxh8 2.g7+ Qxg7 3.hxg7+ Ke7, the initial position of the original study is reached. Rusinek himself considered this version inferior to the original (aesthetics versus task).

== Articles by Rusinek ==
- "Stalemate by pinning in the middle of the board", in EG No. 51 (June 1978)
- "Studies in the FIDE Album 1986-88", in EG No. 105 (May 1992)
- "Grzegorz Grzeban, 1902-1991", in EG No. 106 (October 1992)
