= Babson task =

Type of chess problem

A Babson Task (or simply Babson) is a directmate chess problem with the following properties:

1. White has only one key, or first move, that forces checkmate in the stipulated number of moves.
2. Black's defences include the promotion of a certain pawn to a queen, rook, bishop, or knight. (Black may have other defences as well.)
3. If Black promotes, then the only way for White towards a forced checkmate in the stipulated number of moves is to promote a pawn to the same piece to which Black promoted.

Joseph Ney Babson (1852–1929), the task's eponym, first conceived of the task in 1884, but never solved it. To devise a satisfying Babson task is regarded as one of the greatest challenges in chess composing. For almost a century, it was unknown whether such a task could exist.

The Babson task is a special form of Allumwandlung, a chess problem in which the solution contains promotions to each of the four possible pieces. Such problems were already known when Babson formulated his task.

== Forerunners of the Babson task ==
Wolfgang Pauly, 1912

Position: g8 white bishop, a7 white king, d7 black pawn, e7 white bishop, f7 white pawn, g7 white pawn, d6 white pawn, f5 white pawn, g4 white pawn, h4 white pawn, a3 black pawn, c3 black pawn, h3 black king, a2 black pawn, b2 white pawn, c2 black pawn, g2 white rook, b1 black bishop, c1 white rook, e1 white knight

White to play and mate in four

This 1912 problem by Wolfgang Pauly is, as it were, a three-quarter Babson task: three of Black's promotions are matched by White.

The key is 1.b3, after which there are the following lines:

- 1...a1=Q 2.f8=Q Qb2 3.Qa8 Qxc1 (Qxb3 4.Qf3#) 4.Qf3#
- 1...a1=R 2.f8=R (2.f8=Q? a2 3.Qa8 stalemate (3.Qf6 stalemate)) a2 3.Rf6 Kxh4 4.Rh6#
- 1...a1=N 2.f8=N (2.f8=Q? Nxb3 3.Qa8 Nd4 and no mate) a2 3.Ng6 Nxb3 4.Nf4#

This is not a full Babson, however, because 1...a1=B 2.f8=B does not work; White must instead play 2.f8=Q, with similar play to above.

== Selfmate Babsons ==
The earliest Babson tasks are all in the form of a selfmate, in which White, moving first, must force Black to deliver checkmate against Black's will within a specified number of moves. In 1914, Babson himself published such a problem, in which three different white pawns shared the promotions.

Henry Wald Bettmann
1st Prize, 1925–26 Babson Task Tourney

Position: h8 white knight, a7 white pawn, b7 black pawn, c7 black pawn, f7 white pawn, a6 white rook, b6 black rook, c6 black king, h6 white pawn, a5 white king, c5 white pawn, b4 white pawn, e4 white pawn, h4 white pawn, c3 white pawn, h3 white queen, f2 black pawn, h2 white rook, f1 white knight, g1 white bishop

Selfmate in three

Henry Wald Bettmann composed the first problem in which one black pawn and one white pawn were involved in all promotions, winning 1st prize in the Babson Task Tourney 1925–26.

The key in Bettmann's problem is 1.a8=B, after which play is as follows:

- 1...fxg1=Q 2.f8=Q (2.f8=R? Qxf1 3.b5+ Kxc5; both 2.f8=B? and 2.f8=N? fail to Qg8!) Qxf1 3.b5+ (3.Qfxf1? Rxa6 is not checkmate, as White can play 4.Qxa6) Qxb5#; or Qxc5 3.b5+ (3.bxc5? Rxa6 is not checkmate, as White can play 4.Kb4; 3.Qxc5 checkmates black, entirely wrong for a selfmate) or 2...Q-any 3.anyxQ Rxa6#
- 1...fxg1=R 2.f8=R (2.f8=Q? Rxf1 3.Qfxf1 (3.b5 checkmates Black) Rxa6 is not checkmate, as White can play 4.Qxa6) R-any 3.anyxR Rxa6#
- 1...fxg1=B 2.f8=B (2.f8=Q? Bxc5 3.bxc5 (3.b5 checkmates Black; 3.Qxc5 checkmates Black) Rxa6 is not checkmate, as White can play 4.Kb4) B-any 3.anyxB Rxa6#
- 1...fxg1=N 2.f8=N (2.f8=Q? Nxh3! 3.Rxh3 Kd7) N-any 3.anyxN Rxa6#

Various other composers later composed similar problems.

== Directmate Babsons ==
Composing a Babson task in directmate form (where White moves first and must checkmate Black against any defence within a stipulated number of moves) was thought so difficult that very little effort was put into it until the 1960s, when Pierre Drumare began his work on the problem, which occupied him for the next twenty years or so. He managed to compose a Babson task in which the knight is replaced with the nightrider (a fairy chess piece which moves by making any number of knight moves in the same direction on unblocked squares) but found it hard to devise one using normal pieces: because of the knight's limited range, it is difficult to justify a knight promotion by White in response to a knight promotion by Black on the other side of the board.

A concurrent attempt was published in 1972 by composer Bo Lindgren, a mate in 5 moves, but although it showed all four promotions and was legal, it was never considered a true Babson Task as the promotion to Knight was not immediately following the black promotion (as the theme requires), but happened only as the final mating move.

Pierre Drumare
Memorial Camil Seneca, 1980

Position: d8 white rook, g8 black queen, h8 white bishop, f7 white pawn, b6 white knight, h6 white bishop, b5 white king, f5 white pawn, a4 white rook, b4 white pawn, c4 white pawn, e4 black pawn, f4 white rook, b3 white bishop, d3 white pawn, e3 black knight, a2 white rook, b2 black pawn, c2 black pawn, d2 black king, e2 black knight, g2 black pawn, a1 black bishop, b1 white queen, c1 black bishop, d1 black rook, e1 black rook, f1 black bishop, g1 black rook, h1 black bishop

White to play and mate in five

When Drumare eventually succeeded using conventional pieces in 1980, the result was regarded as highly unsatisfactory, even by Drumare himself. It is a mate in five (first published Memorial Seneca, 1980). The key is 1.Rf2, after which captures by Black on b1 are answered by captures by White on g8.

Efficiency in chess problems is considered a great boon, but Drumare's attempt is very inefficient: no fewer than 30 pieces are on the board. It also has six promoted pieces in the initial position (even a single promoted piece is considered something of a "cheat" in chess problems), which is in any case illegal: one of the white f-pawns must have made a capture, and the white and black b- and c-pawns must have made two captures between them, making three in total, yet only two units are missing from the board. And even without this detail, the number of captures required to obtain all the promoted pieces is almost certainly still higher. Despite all these flaws, it is the first complete Babson task in a directmate problem.

In 1982, two years after composing this problem, Drumare gave up, saying that the Babson task would never be satisfactorily solved.

Leonid Yarosh
Shakhmaty v SSSR, March 1983

Position: b8 black queen, h8 white rook, a7 white pawn, d7 white knight, f6 black pawn, c5 black pawn, f5 black pawn, c4 white pawn, d4 black king, f4 black bishop, h4 black knight, g3 white pawn, a2 white pawn, b2 white knight, c2 black pawn, d2 white pawn, f2 white pawn, h2 white king, a1 white bishop, b1 white queen, f1 white rook, h1 white bishop

White to play and mate in four

The following year, Leonid Yarosh, a football coach from Kazan who was virtually unknown as a problem composer until that point, came up with a much better Babson task than Drumare's: the position is legal, it is much simpler than Drumare's problem, and there are no promoted pieces on board. First published in March 1983 in the famous Russian chess magazine Shakhmaty v SSSR, this is generally thought of as the first satisfactory solution of the Babson task. Drumare himself had high praise for the problem.

The key is 1.Rxh4, and the main lines are:

- 1...cxb1=Q 2.axb8=Q Qxb2 (2...Qe4 3.Qxf4 Qxf4 4.Rxf4#) 3.Qb3 Qc3 4.Qxc3#
- 1...cxb1=R 2.axb8=R (2.axb8=Q? Rxb2 3.Qb3 stalemate) Rxb2 3.Rb3 Kxc4 4.Rxf4#
- 1...cxb1=B 2.axb8=B (2.axb8=Q? Be4 3.Qxf4 stalemate) Be4 3.Bxf4 Bxh1 4.Be3#
- 1...cxb1=N 2.axb8=N (2.axb8=Q? Nxd2 and no mate) Nxd2 3.Nc6+ Kc3 4.Rc1#

However, Yarosh's problem has a small flaw: the key is a capture, something which is generally frowned upon in problems. Also, when first presented, the black piece at h4 was a pawn, but a computer discovered an additional solution by 1.axb8=N hxg3+ 2.Kh3 Bxb8 3.Qxc2 and mate next move. Yarosh then substituted a knight on that square; now 1.axb8=N fails to 1...Nf3+ 2.Bxf3 Bxb8 3.Qxc2 Bxg3+ and White is too late. Nevertheless, when Dutch author Tim Krabbé saw this version in the Soviet publication 64, he records that the realisation that somebody had at last solved the Babson task had the effect upon him as if he had "... opened a newspaper and seen the headline 'Purpose Of Life Discovered'."

Leonid Yarosh
Shakhmaty v SSSR, August 1983

Position: a8 white bishop, b8 black queen, d8 white bishop, f8 white king, d7 white pawn, e7 black pawn, f7 white knight, a6 white pawn, e6 white pawn, f6 black pawn, a5 white pawn, c5 black pawn, f5 white pawn, c4 white pawn, d4 black king, f4 black bishop, h4 white rook, b3 black pawn, a2 black pawn, b2 white knight, d2 white pawn, f2 white pawn, a1 white queen, b1 white rook

White to play and mate in four

Yarosh continued to work on the problem, and in August 1983, he created an improved version with a non-capturing key, which appeared in Shakhmaty v SSSR. Many chess problemists, including Tim Krabbé, consider the problem one of the greatest ever composed. Again, it is a mate in four moves.

The key here is non-capturing and also thematic (that is, it is logically related to the rest of the solution): 1.a7!. The variations are largely the same as in the original:

- 1...axb1=Q 2.axb8=Q Qxb2 3.Qxb3 Qc3 4.Qbxc3# (alternatively, 2...Qe4 3.Qxf4 Qxf4 4.Rxf4#)
- 1...axb1=R 2.axb8=R (2.axb8=Q? Rxb2 3.Qxb3 is stalemate) Rxb2 3.Rxb3 Kxc4 4.Qa4# (alternatively, 2...Re1 3.Rxf4+ Re4 4.Rxf4#)
- 1...axb1=B 2.axb8=B (2.axb8=Q? Be4 3.Qxf4 stalemate) Be4 3.Bxf4 B(any) 4.Be3#
- 1...axb1=N 2.axb8=N (2.axb8=Q? Nxd2 and no mate) Nxd2 3.Qc1 Ne4 4.Nc6# (alternatively, 2...Nc3 3.Rxf4+ Ne4 4.Rxf4#)

There is another defence for black that is non-thematic and also leads to mate in four: 1...Qxd8+ 2.Kg7 axb1=Q 3.Rxf4+ Qe4 4. Rxe4#. However, this is not considered a flaw according to the rules of the Babson task.

Pierre Drumare
Thèmes-64, 1985

Position: f8 black knight, g8 black queen, c7 white knight, f7 white pawn, g7 white pawn, h7 black pawn, g6 black bishop, h6 white pawn, f5 white pawn, g5 black king, a4 white queen, b4 black pawn, g4 white knight, b3 white king, d3 black pawn, e3 black rook, f3 white bishop, g3 white pawn, c2 black pawn, d2 white rook, e2 white pawn, g2 white rook, c1 white bishop

White to play and mate in five

Yarosh composed a completely different Babson task later in 1983 and another in 1986. Several other Babsons were later composed by other authors, including one by Drumare in 1985. The solution of this Babson is 1.fxg8=Q dxe2 2.Nxe3 e1=Q/R/B/N 3.gxf8=Q/R/B/N and now mate in two in all variations.

== The cyclic Babson ==
Peter Hoffmann, Die Schwalbe, 2003

Position: a8 white rook, e8 white bishop, g8 black rook, h7 white pawn, a6 white bishop, e6 black bishop, f6 black king, g6 white knight, h6 black pawn, a5 black pawn, g5 black pawn, h5 white rook, a4 white king, d4 white knight, f4 black pawn, g4 white pawn, c3 white pawn, f3 white pawn, a2 white pawn, b2 white bishop, c2 black pawn, d2 black pawn, e2 black pawn, h2 white queen, c1 white bishop, e1 white knight

White to play and mate in four

In a cyclic Babson, rather than Black’s promotions being matched by White, they are related in cyclic form: for example, Black promoting to a queen means White must promote to a bishop, Black promoting to a bishop means White must promote to a rook, Black promoting to a rook means White must promote to a knight, and Black promoting to a knight means White must promote to a queen.

The August 2003 issue of the German problem magazine Die Schwalbe contained the problem to the right, a mate in four by Peter Hoffmann. Hoffmann had previously published a number of conventional directmate Babsons, but this one is significant because it is the first cyclic Babson. However, as with Drumare's original Babson task, the problem uses promoted pieces and has a capturing key.

The key is 1.Nxe6, threatening 2.hxg8=Q and 3.Qf7#. The thematic defences are:

- 1...d1=Q 2.hxg8=B (2.hxg8=Q? Qd7+ 3.Bxd7 stalemate; 2.hxg8=N+? Kxe6 and no mate), threatening 3.c4+ Q-moves 4.BxQ#
  - 2...Qd7+ 3.Bxd7 Kxg6 4.Rxh6#
  - 2...Qxc1 3.Rxg5 (threat: 4.Rf5#) hxg5 4.Qh8#
- 1...d1=B 2.hxg8=R (2.hxg8=Q? stalemate; 2.hxg8=N+? Kxe6 and no mate) Kxe6 3.Rd8 3.Kf6 Rd6#
- 1...d1=R 2.hxg8=N (2.hxg8=Q? Rd4+ 3.c4 stalemate) Kxe6 3.Qxe2+ K-moves 4.Qe5#
- 1...d1=N 2.hxg8=Q (2.hxg8=N+? Kxe6 3.Qxe2+ Ne3! and no mate) Nxb2+ 3.Kb5(Bxb2) and 4.Qf7#

There are also a number of sidelines.

Peter Hoffmann, Schach, 2005

Position: f8 black rook, h8 white knight, b7 white pawn, c7 white pawn, e7 white pawn, b6 black pawn, c6 white pawn, e6 black king, f6 white pawn, a5 black pawn, d5 white knight, f5 black pawn, h5 white pawn, a4 white king, f4 white pawn, c3 white bishop, e3 white pawn, b2 white rook, c2 black pawn, d2 black pawn, e2 black pawn, c1 white queen, e1 white rook

White to play and mate in four

In the September 2005 issue of Schach, the first cyclic Babson without promoted pieces in the initial position was published. Again, the composer was Peter Hoffmann.

The key is 1.Nxb6. The thematic defences are:

- 1...d1=Q 2.exf8=B (2.exf8=Q? Qd4+ 3.Bxd4 stalemate; 2.exf8=N+? Kd6 3.Be5+ Kc5 and no mate)
  - 2...Qd4+ 3.exd4 Kxf6 4.d5#
- 1...d1=B 2.exf8=R (2.exf8=Q? stalemate; 2.exf8=N+? Kd6 3.Be5+ Kc5 and no mate)
  - 2...Kd6 3.Qd2+ with mate after any move by black
- 1...d1=R 2.exf8=N+ (2.exf8=Q? Rd4+ 3.Bxd4 stalemate; 2.exf8=B? Rd7 3.c8=Q(B) stalemate)
  - 2...Kd6 3.Be5+ Kc5 4.Qxc2#
- 1...d1=N 2.exf8=Q (2.exf8=N+? Kd6 3.Be5+ Kc5 and no mate)
  - 2...Nxc3+ 3.Kxa5 Ne4 4.c8=Q#

== Babson Task in an endgame study ==
Achieving a Babson task in an endgame study was long considered impossible because of the enormous complexity required to make every promotion the only winning move, avoid duals, and keep the position legal. Prior to 2025, some partial Babsons had been shown in the form of studies, but at a maximum only three quarters of the theme was achieved (usually missing the rook variation).

Gady Costeff - EG n. 238, 2024

Illegal position

Position: e8 black knight, a7 black pawn, b7 black rook, d7 black knight, f7 white pawn, g7 black pawn, h7 black pawn, a6 black pawn, f6 black king, g6 black rook, h6 black bishop, a5 white pawn, d5 white pawn, e5 white knight, g5 black pawn, a4 white king, d4 white pawn, g4 white pawn, a3 white pawn, b3 white knight, b2 white bishop, c2 black pawn, d2 black pawn, e2 black pawn, c1 white rook, e1 white knight

Black to move - White wins

In October 2024, the Israeli-American chess composer Gady Costeff published on EG an attempt of a complete Babson Task in an endgame study.

Solution:

1... d1=Q 2. fxe8=Q! [White wins]

1... d1=R 2. fxe8=R! [White wins] [Thematic Try 2. fxe8=Q? Nc5+ 3. Nxc5 Rxd4+! 4. Nc4 Rb4+! 5. axb4 Stalemate]

1... d1=B 2. fxe8=B! [White wins]

1... d1=N 2. fxe8=N+! [White wins] [2. fxe8=Q? Nxb2#! Checkmate]

Although the solution to Costeff's study is correct from a purely analytical perspective, the position is technically illegal: only the h-pawn could have promoted into one of the three white Knights, which would require an illegal move (such as jumping over h7) or an excessive number of white captures. While some modifications—such as removing the black pawn on a7—might seem to resolve the issue, even minor changes result in unintended side effects, including dual solutions, positional instability, or unsolvability. The study's construction also involves a high piece density, and some candidate black defenses (e.g. 1...Ke7, 1...Nd6, 1...Nc7) have been shown to require extended computer-assisted analysis to be conclusively refuted. Despite the illegality of the setting, the study marked the first demonstration of a complete Babson Task within the endgame study genre. A historical precedent exists in the direct-mate genre, where Pierre Drumare achieved the theme for the first time in 1980, also in an illegal setting.

Daniele Guglielmo Gatti - Inspired by and dedicated to Gady Costeff - EG n. 239, January 2025

Position: g8 black knight, e7 black pawn, h7 white pawn, e6 black pawn, g6 black knight, h6 black king, a5 black queen, b5 white knight, c5 white pawn, g5 white knight, a4 black pawn, c4 white king, d4 white pawn, g4 white pawn, a3 white pawn, d3 white pawn, e3 white bishop, a2 white pawn, e2 black pawn, f2 black pawn, g2 black pawn, e1 white rook, g1 white rook, h1 black bishop

Black to move - White wins

In January 2025, again on EG, the Italian chess composer Daniele Guglielmo Gatti showed a complete Babson Task in an endgame study. The composer claimed to have worked on it for only forty-five days, after having seen Costeff's failed attempt. Gatti composed a significantly different position, but retained some core elements and ideas of Costeff's one. He managed to make the position legal, absent of promoted pieces, and improved the economy of the problem. This made him the first composer to correctly achieve the Babson task in an endgame study, 141 years after the theme was proposed.

The solution of the study is as follows:

— 1…f1=Q 2.hxg8=Q! Ne5+ 3.dxe5 Qf4+ 4.Ne4! avoids stalemate and wins,

— 1…f1=R 2.hxg8=R!/i Rxg1/ii 3.Nd6/iii exd6 4.Ne4+ Kh7 5.Nf6 mate,

— 1…f1=B 2.hxg8=B!/iv Kg7 (Qxe1; Nf3+! wins) 3.c6 Qxe1 4.c7 Qb1 5.Nxe6+ Kxg8 6.c8=Q+ Kh7 7.Ng5+ Kg7 8.Qf5 Qxa2+ 9.Kc5 e1=Q 10.Ne6+ Qxe6 11.Qxe6 wins,

— 1…f1=N 2.hxg8=N+!/v Kg7 3.Nxe6+ Kxg8 4.Rxe2 Nxe3+ 5.Rxe3 Qd2 6.Ree1 Qxa2+ 7.Kb4 Qb3+ 8.Ka5 wins.

i) Thematic try: 2.hxg8=Q? Ne5+! 3.dxe5 Rf4+! 4.Ne4 Qc3+ (or Qxb5+) 5. Kxc3 stalemate.

ii) Rxe1 3.Rxe1 with: Qxe1 4.Nf3+ wins, or g1=Q 4.Nxe6+ (Rxg1? Bd5! mate;) Kh7 5.Rg7+ Kh8 6.Rxg1 wins.

iii) Threatens 4.Nf7 mate. Prematurely 3.Ne4+? Kh7! wins as there is no mate on f6.

iv) Thematic try: 2.hxg8=N+? Kg7 3.c6 Qxe1 4.c7 Qb1 5.Nxe6+ Kh7 The point: no promotion with check 6.c8=Q Qxa2+ 7.Kb4 Qb3+ 8.Ka5 (Kc5? Qc2+ skewer) e1=Q+ 9.Kb6 Qxe3 another point 10.Nf6+ Kh6 11.g5+ Qxg5 12.Ng8+ Kh5 and draw.

v) Other promotions all fail to Nxe3 mate.
