= Gady Costeff =

Israeli chess composer (born 1961)

Gady Costeff (born July 5, 1961 in Be’er Sheva, Israel) is an Israeli-American chess composer.

== Chess composition career ==
Costeff composed more than 100 endgame studies in his career. He also composed about 30 problems, often collaborating with Ofer Comay and Paz Einat. He was granted the title of FIDE International Master of Chess Composition in 2008. He also served as editor/director of EG, a magazine exclusively devoted to endgame studies, where he oversaw and contributed analytical content for many years.

Costeff is known in the chess composition community for his tendency to research tasks in endgame studies. He worked intensively throughout his career on the achievement of the Babson task in an endgame study, first achieving partial results (3/4 of the theme) in 1981, then achieving a complete Babson task in 2011, but in illegal position. The position was kept secret for over a decade, trying to find a correction, until Costeff decided to publish it on EG n. 238 in October 2024, due to the apparent impossibility of correcting the scheme.

Costeff declared on his editorial: "The position is unreachable by a single capture. [...] I composed this [setting] in 2011 and tried for a decade to make it legal. [...] I do think it is interesting and readers would be interested in how a Babson may look."

Gady Costeff - EG n. 238, 2024

Position: e8 black knight, a7 black pawn, b7 black rook, d7 black knight, f7 white pawn, g7 black pawn, h7 black pawn, a6 black pawn, f6 black king, g6 black rook, h6 black bishop, a5 white pawn, d5 white pawn, e5 white knight, g5 black pawn, a4 white king, d4 white pawn, g4 white pawn, a3 white pawn, b3 white knight, b2 white bishop, c2 black pawn, d2 black pawn, e2 black pawn, c1 white rook, e1 white knight

Black to move - White wins

Solution:

1... d1=Q 2. fxe8=Q! [White wins]

1... d1=R 2. fxe8=R! [White wins] [Thematic Try 2. fxe8=Q? Nc5+ 3. Nxc5 Rxd4+! 4. Nc4 Rb4+! 5. axb4 Stalemate]

1... d1=B 2. fxe8=B! [White wins]

1... d1=N 2. fxe8=N+! [White wins] [2. fxe8=Q? Nxb2#! Checkmate]

Although the solution to Costeff's study is correct from a purely analytical perspective, the position is technically illegal: only the h-pawn could have promoted into one of the three white Knights, which would require an illegal move (such as jumping over h7) or an excessive number of white captures. While some modifications — such as removing the black pawn on a7—might seem to resolve the issue, even minor changes result in unintended side effects, including dual solutions, positional instability, or unsolvability. The study's construction also involves a high piece density, and some candidate black defenses (e.g. 1...Ke7, 1...Nd6, 1...Nc7) have been shown to require extended computer-assisted analysis to be conclusively refuted. Despite the illegality of the setting, the study marked the first demonstration of a complete Babson task within the endgame study genre. A historical precedent exists in the direct-mate genre, where Pierre Drumare achieved the theme for the first time in 1980, after 20 years of research, but in an illegal setting with many promoted pieces.

After the publication of this scheme, the Italian chess composer Daniele Guglielmo Gatti worked on it and published a sound, legal and economical version on EG n. 239 (January 2025). Costeff was honored with a dedication from Gatti, as source of inspiration.

== CQL development ==
Costeff also co‑developed the Chess Query Language (CQL) — an engine and query syntax for searching motifs in chess study databases — together with Lewis Stiller.

== Publications ==
- Gady Costeff (2004). The Chess Query Language: CQL. ICGA Journal Vol. 27, No. 4 pdf
- Gady Costeff (2006). How I Became A Great Composer. (EG Volume 11 159-163 ARVES 2006) pdf
- Gady Costeff (2024): One Endgame Study in a Thousand
