= Joseph Ney Babson =

American chess composer (1852–1929)

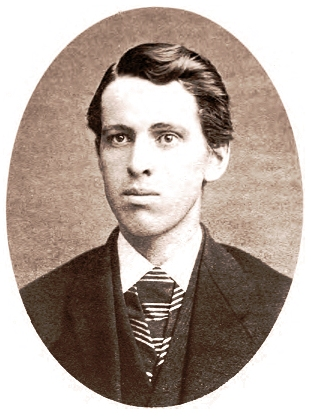
Joseph Ney Babson

Joseph Ney Babson (December 26, 1852 – December 20, 1929) was an American chess composer, known especially for his work in selfmate problems and conditional problems.

Babson served as an editor of the American magazine Brentano's Chess Monthly from 1881 to 1882. By profession, he was a sales representative.

== Babson Task ==
Joseph Ney Babson is primarily associated with the Babson Task, a well known problem theme characterized by the following conditions:

1. White moves first;
2. Black defends by promoting a pawn to a Queen, Rook, Bishop, or Knight;
3. White responds by promoting a pawn to the same piece chosen by Black;
4. The sequence continues for n moves, at the end of which White must achieve the stipulated goal.

Additional "minor" conditions include:

1. Both White and Black must always promote the same pawn on the same square in every variation;
2. The White counter-promotion must occur immediately after the Black promotion in every variation;
3. The fact that White is "forced" to make the corresponding promotion is not an arbitrary condition but the only way for White to achieve the stipulated goal.

Considered one of the most difficult and ambitious themes in chess composition, Babson initially proposed it for selfmate problems, publishing several examples including one as early as 1913. However, he never solved it in the directmate form ("White to move and mate in N moves"). For nearly fifty years, creating a directmate with all four promotions was considered impossible.

== Attempts to realize a directmate Babson Task ==
In 1912, German-Romanian composer Wolfgang Pauly created a problem with a partial Babson theme (3/4), a four-move mate with three different corresponding promotions (to Queen, Rook, and Knight).

In 1972, Swedish composer Bo Lindgren produced a "pseudo-Babson" in a five-move mate using three White Bishops, but it was not considered a true Babson since the Knight promotion violated the rule that White's counter-promotion must occur immediately after Black's.

In 1980, French composer Pierre Drumare created a directmate with the complete Babson theme, featuring four promotions, but in an illegal position using six promoted pieces. Dissatisfied, he abandoned the theme two years later, considering it impossible to achieve correctly.

In 1982, Peter Hoffmann also achieved a complete Babson Task in a four-move mate, but again in an illegal position with four promoted pieces.

In March 1983, Russian composer Leonid Yarosh, virtually unknown in the problemist community, composed the first complete Babson Task in a legal and economical position, later improved in August 1983. Subsequent Babson problems were composed, notably by Hoffmann, who achieved the first four promotions in a cyclic pattern (AB-BC-CD-DA). After seeing Yarosh's problem, Pierre Drumare finally succeeded in composing a complete Babson Task in 1985.

== Babson Task in endgame studies ==
In 1981, Israeli-American composer Gady Costeff achieved a partial Babson Task in an endgame study (3/4 of the theme). Other composers similarly created only partial versions, often failing to integrate the Rook promotion.

Only in October 2024 did Costeff publish a complete Babson Task in a study in EG No. 238, analytically correct but in an illegal position using promoted pieces. He had composed it in 2011 but, unable to resolve the illegality after over ten years of attempts, published it out of competition to inspire other composers.

In January 2025, Italian composer Daniele Guglielmo Gatti published a study featuring a complete Babson Task in a legal position without promoted pieces, improving also the economy. He declared having worked about 45 days starting from Costeff's position and dedicated the achievement to him.

== Bibliography and additional sources ==
- A. Chicco, G. Porreca, Dizionario enciclopedico degli scacchi, Mursia, Milan, 1971
