= András Flumbort =

Hungarian chess grandmaster (born 1984)

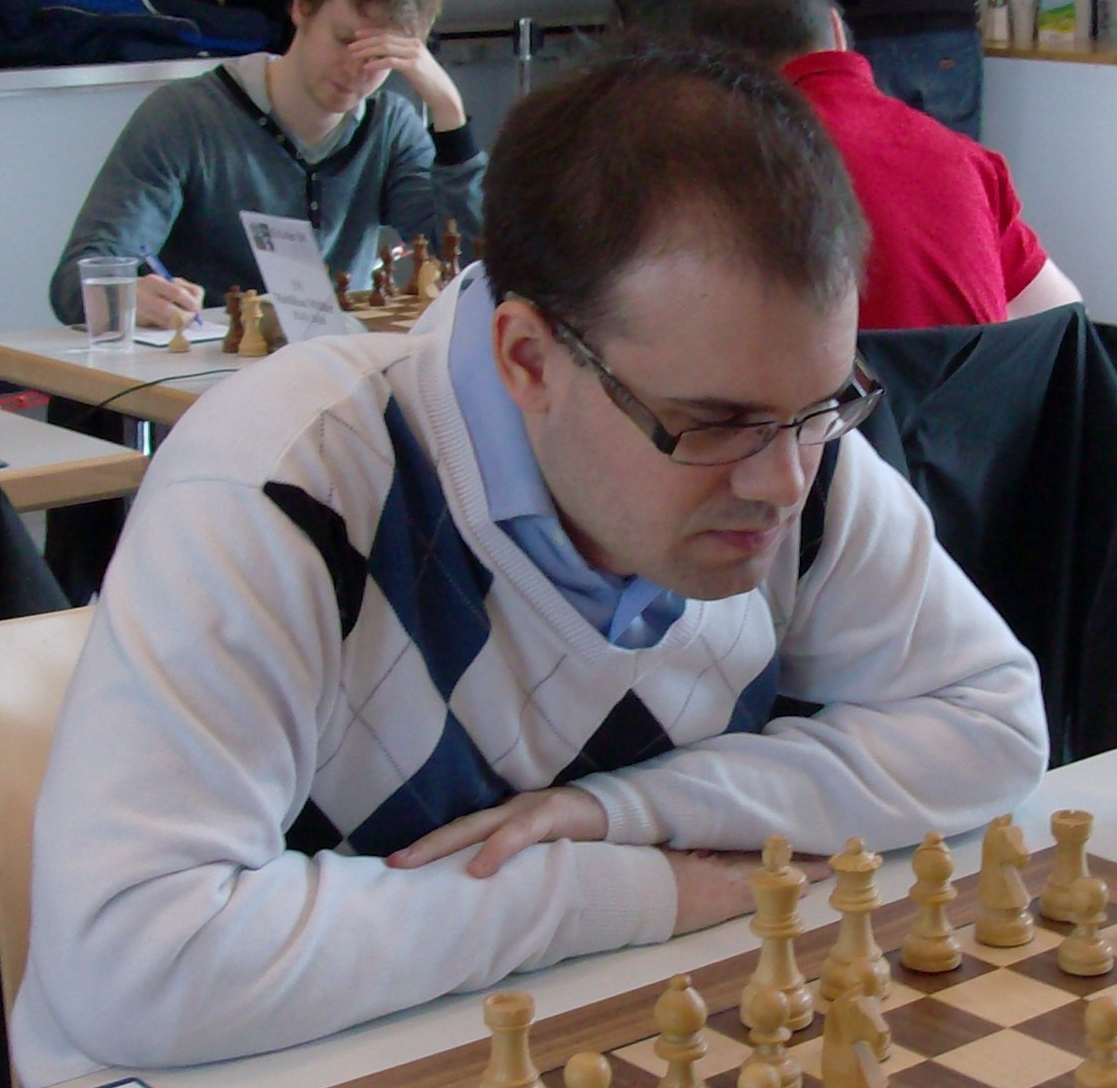

Personal information
- Born: August 17, 1984 (age 41) Nagykanizsa, Hungary

Chess career
- Country: Hungary
- Title: Grandmaster (2010)
- FIDE rating: 2441 (July 2026)
- Peak rating: 2572 (May 2011)

András Flumbort is a Hungarian chess grandmaster. He became the manager of Richárd Rapport in 2013.

== Chess career ==
In 1999, he was a member of the Hungarian national team at the Children's Chess Olympiad.

In 2000, he finished 3rd in the U16 Hungarian Chess Championship behind Gergely Antal and Ferenc Berkes.

In 2003, he won the U18 Hungarian Chess Championship and was coached by Zoltán Ribli.

He achieved the Grandmaster title in 2010, earning his norms at the:

- II PannonPower Kupa GM in March 2006
- Hungarian Team Championship Super League in April 2006
- Bundesliga tournament in April 2010
