= Global Chess Festival =

Chess event in Budapest, Hungary

The Judit Polgár's Global Chess Festival is an annual one-day festival celebrating the diversity of chess, held in Budapest, Hungary. The festival started in 2015, and connects fans and chess organizers around the world with chess-related activities.

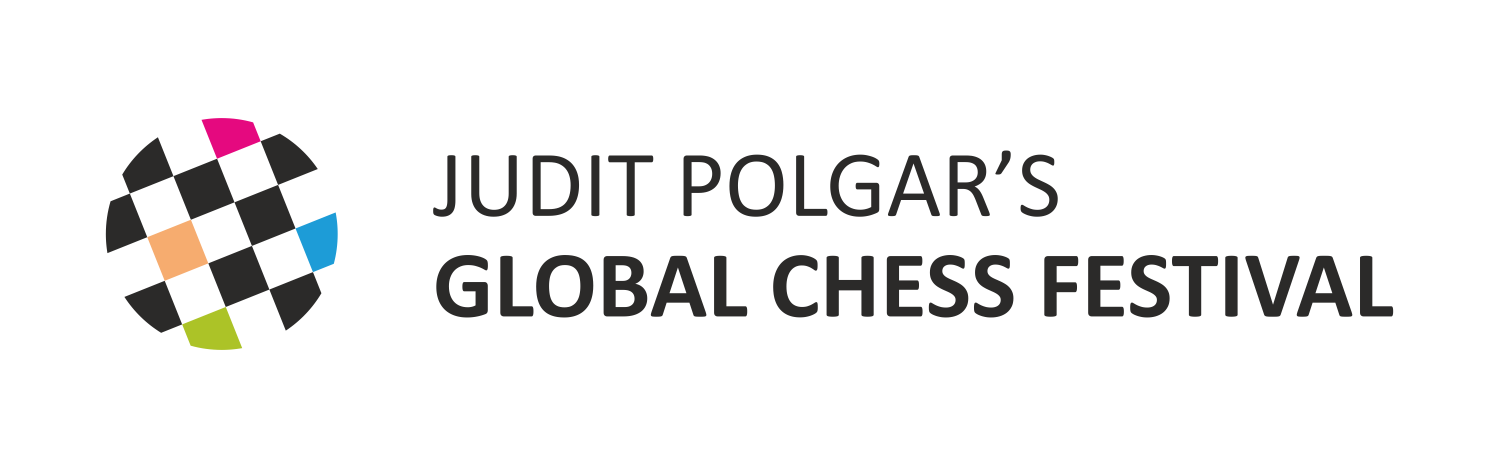
GCF logo

== The event ==
The festival is held every year on the second Saturday in October. Chess activities for adults and children include professional tournaments, simultaneous chess games, educational conferences, art shows and various programs for families. The festival's slogan is: "Chess Connects Us". A traditional simultaneous exhibition is held at the Budapest venue, with the sisters Judit and Sofia Polgar.

=== Global Chess Festival 2016 ===
It was held in the Buda Castle Garden Bazaar under the patronage of Tibor Navracsics, Member of the European Commission. The programs included professional chess tournaments, simultaneous exhibitions, school challenges, social gatherings, and art shows related to chess. The Highlander Cup hosted World Champion (2004) Rustam Kasimdzhanov from Uzbekistan, the Israeli World Chess Championship Challenger Boris Gelfand, two-time chess Olympiad silver medalist Zoltán Almási, six-time Hungarian champion Ferenc Berkes, member of the Olympic team Benjamin Gledura, Woman's European champion Hoang Thanh Trang and grandmasters Gabor Papp and Gergely Antal.

=== Global Chess Festival 2017 ===
The 3rd Global Chess Festival was held in Graphisoft Park, Budapest. Among the programs: the Chess Palace Cup for kids, Generational Clash, LIVE Chess Theme Artwork, a musical performance by the French composer Jason Kouchak, combining Chess & Music.

=== Global Chess Festival 2018 ===
In 2018, 250 venues from 23 countries took part in the Fourth Global Chess Festival. The main event was at the Hungarian National Gallery. The event was followed online by nearly 100,000 people. Educational chess was another highlight of the festival. Children, parents and teachers get the chance every year to find out more about Judit Polgár's Chess Palace and Chess Playground educational programs and also meet the authors of the books face to face.

A new award called the Goodwill Ambassador of Artistic Values of Chess was given to artists whose work has been inspired by chess. These include Japanese-American multimedia artist, peace activist Yoko Ono and her long-time collaborator Sam Havadtoy, Chilean singer-songwriter Juga, Hungarian pianist Gergely Bogányi and French composer Jason Kouchak.

=== Global Chess Festival 2019 ===
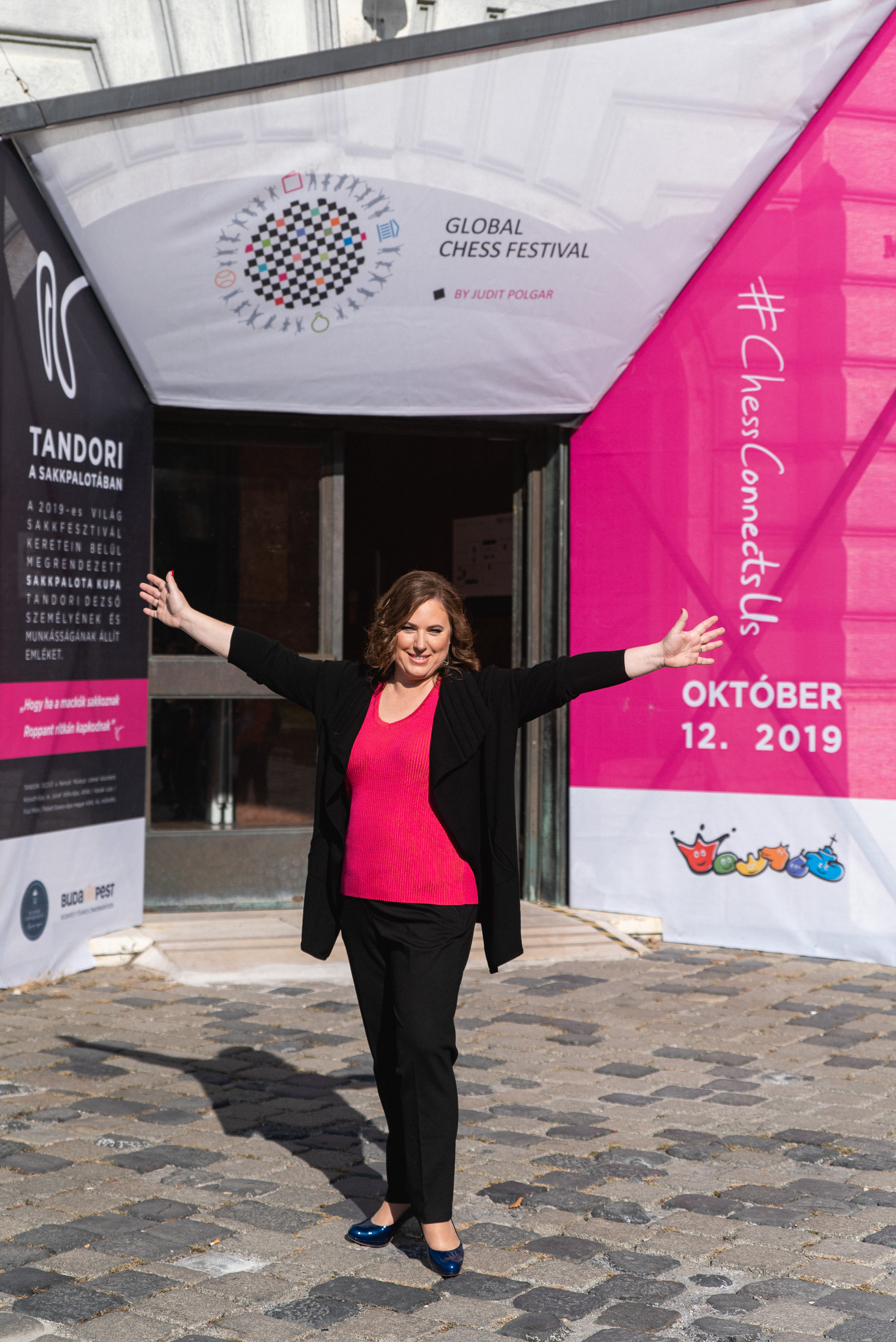
Judit Polgár opened the festival in 2019

The Fifth Global Chess Festival was again held in the Hungarian National Gallery in October 12, 2019. Among the special guests were Arkady Dvorkovich, president of the International Chess Federation (FIDE), Vladimir Kramnik, 14th world champion, and the legendary trio of the three Polgar Sisters. It was the first time to organize The Inspiration Cup, which is a funny and entertaining form of chess called "Hand&Brain", where couples compete with each other, one player being the "Brain" to name a piece and the other player being the "Hand" to decide where to move with the piece. Also this year was the first edition of the Chess Connects Conference with renowned scientists, world-famous chess players and educators. It highlighted the major role chess plays in art, its contribution to science, the opportunities it provides in education as well as the evolution of chess as a sport. Ken Rogoff, a professor at Harvard University, showed how he could use his experience as a chess player in his earlier career with a special focus on the human factor. Neuroscientist Sylvester E. Vizi, former president of the Hungarian Academy of Sciences, gave a lecture on artificial intelligence, which was also discussed by international female chess master Natasha Regan and grandmaster Matthew Sadler, co-authors of the bestselling book on AlphaZero. Spanish specialist Leontxo Garcia outlined the benefits of chess in education, Chilean singer Juga compared the universal language of chess and music, and grandmaster Susan Polgar highlighted the success of the institute she has founded (SPICE) to encourage college chess. The 2019 Goodwill Ambassador of Chess award went to Vladimir Kramnik for his life achievement in Chess as a Sport, Leontxo Garcia for his efforts with Chess in Education, Demis Hassabis, DeepMind's chief executive officer and one of the foremost artificial intelligence researchers and Alpha Zero for Science in Chess. The late grandmaster Pal Benko was awarded a posthumous award for his artful ways on the chessboard.

=== Global Chess Festival 2020 ===
Due to the pandemics the 6th Global Chess Festival was organized online on 10 October. On the program there were presentations on chess as a sport, science, education and a form of art by renowned experts. One of the highlights was a historic talk between Garry Kasparov, former World Champion and Judit Polgár, the greatest female chess player of all time. The Judit Polgár Chess Foundation also presented the returning Goodwill Ambassadors of Chess awards, which were handed out to notable figures that have emboldened the values of chess in their fields. These winners were: Simen Agdestein Goodwill Ambassador of Chess as a Sport; Oscar Panno, Goodwill Ambassador of Chess in Education; Jan Timman, Goodwill Ambassador of Art in Chess and John Nunn, Goodwill Ambassador of Science in Chess. Also a number of international and youth tournaments and exhibition matches took place throughout the day. While Judit Polgár and Sofia Polgar both played simultaneous games online from around the world, it was the competitions that chess fans were especially keen to see: the Chess Challenge, the Chess Palace Cup, and the World Continental Online Youth Cup. The latter was organised by the Judit Polgár Chess Foundation together with the European Chess Union and ended with the Asian team winning the tournament.

=== Judit Polgar's Global Chess Festival 2021 ===
The 7th edition of Judit Polgár's Global Chess Festival was a hybrid event with a focus on education and creativity. Some programs e.g. the presentation of the Judit Polgár Method, the Educational Chess Summit or the Creativity&Innovation Talks took place in the Hungarian National Gallery, while tournaments and chess masterclasses were running on an interactive online chess channel with renowned trainers, such as Surya Ganguly, Anna Muzychuk, Andras Toth, Noam Manella, Arthur Kogan, Gabor Papp, Krisztian Szabo and Judit Polgár. Also the live programs from the Hungarian National Gallery were broadcast on YouTube. Among the speakers were: Leontxo García, Dana Reizniece-Ozola, Jerry Nash, Lorena García, Jesper Hall, Rita Atkins, Eva Gyarmathy, Bachar Kouatly, David Ros, Noam Manella, Ashwin Subramanian and Norbert Fogarasi. Judit Polgár was in conversation with Hungarian legendary sport athletes Rita Kőbán and Tímea Nagy, and also with inventor Ernő Rubik. The Goodwill Ambassador of Chess Awards were given to Purling London for Chess in Art, to Kenneth Rogoff for Science and Chess, to Jerry Nash for Chess in Education and Viswanathan Anand for Chess as a Sport. Grandmasters Judit Polgár and Zoltán Almási gave simultaneous exhibitions to their challengers. The event was under the patronage of the Member of the European Commission Ms. Mariya Gabriel responsible for Innovation, Research, Culture, Education and Youth.

=== Judit Polgar's Global Chess Festival 2022 ===
The 8th edition of the Global Chess Festival was held on 8th October 2022 as a hybrid event, live in the Hungarian National Gallery and on online channels. The theme being Women in Chess, Women in Sciences reflected on FIDE's initiative which declared 2022 the "Year of Woman in Chess". Speakers and participants discussed topics inspiring young women how to become more successful in chess or STEM fields. Australian university lecturer and chess grandmaster David Smerdon spoke about the relationship between chess and gender in his lecture "Facts and Myths". Network researcher Albert-László Barabási spoke about the role of women in academia. The Educational Chess Summit international conference, in cooperation with the European Chess Union, showcased the best and latest educational programs, innovations and their results in terms of chess in school. Patron of the summit was the Minister of Education and Science of Georgia, Dr. Mikheil Chkhenkeli. Among the speakers were: Adriana Salazar, Rita Atkins, Marta Amigó, Philippe Vukojevic, Stefan Kindermann, Ashwin Subramanian, Jerry Nash, Anastasia Sorokina, Malcolm Pein, Nicolás González García, Jesper Bergmark Hall, Dana Reizniece-Ozola, Judit Polgár, Zurab Azmaiparashvili and Leontxo García. The Inspiration Cup tournament was organized for the 2nd time with the participation of prominent players, such as world No 7 Anish Giri, and which was won by Team Dracarys (Sofia Polgár and Yona Kosashvili). The Goodwill Ambassador of Chess Award was given to Jesper Hall for his merits in "Chess in Education".

=== Judit Polgar's Global Chess Festival 2023 ===
The Global Chess Festival, now a two-day event, celebrated its 9th edition on October 14-15, focusing on how chess influences decision-making in life. Featuring speakers, chess influencers, Olympiad participants, and grandmasters, the festival engaged nearly 350,000 participants both in person and online, exploring topics like the role of chess and artificial intelligence in education. At the National Gallery, Judit Polgár led a hybrid chess simul against 29 players, joined by Indian champion Tania Sachdev and Italian champion Alessia Santeramo, who consulted their online communities for moves. The Grand Decision chess party featured Polgár, Sachdev, Santeramo, and grandmasters Vasily Ivanchuk, Miguel Illescas, and David Howell. Young attendees enjoyed excerpts from Polgár’s book Chess Palace and skill-building activities.

The second day featured the 3rd Educational Chess Summit, with speakers like AI expert Shameed Sait discussing the intersection of chess and AI in education and Dr. Barry Hymer reflecting on the Grow Mindset theory in chess. Representatives from many countries participated, highlighting the global impact of chess. Over 200,000 people followed the Chess Triathlon, where four mixed teams competed in three formats. The event was won by Mighty Fox (Zsóka Gaál & Ferenc Berkes). The festival continues to highlight the diverse applications of chess and its global reach.

The Goodwill Ambassador of Chess in Education Award went to Anzel Laubscher.

=== Judit Polgar's Global Chess Festival 2024 ===
The 10th Judit Polgár’s Global Chess Festival took place on September 17-18, drawing over 6,000 visitors to the Hungarian National Gallery and BOK Hall, with more than 250,000 online participants. With the theme Inspiration, the festival offered over 20 programs for all ages, including the world’s first hybrid community chess simul, where Judit Polgár played against eight on-site and online communities. Visitors met the Polgár family, enjoyed chess challenges, robotics demonstrations, and Star Chess, while younger participants explored Judit Polgár’s Chess Palace series and skill-building activities.

The 4th Educational Chess Summit featured 23 international speakers, including Pep Suarez (Spain), Dijana Dengler (Singapore), Maurice Ashley (USA), Fernando Moreno (USA), and Maria Anna Stefanidi (Cyprus) discussing chess’s impact on education and mental health. Over 120 attendees joined the event at Hotel Intercontinental, with 2,500 watching online. At the Chess Olympiad venue, visitors viewed Judit Polgár’s Olympic medals and participated in chess puzzles and games.

Ernő Rubik, the festival’s patron, called the event a celebration of learning through play, tying it to the 50th anniversary of the Rubik’s Cube.

The Goodwill Ambassador of Chess in Education Awards were given to Dijana Dengler, Fernando Moreno, Csilla Őryné Gombás and Zsombor Rózsa.

=== Judit Polgar's Global Chess Festival 2025 ===
The Global Chess Festival 2025 was held on 30 September 2025 at the Hungarian National Gallery in Budapest. It marked the 11th edition of the event and continued its mission of promoting chess as a tool for education, creativity, and community engagement. The slogan was: Play. Inspire. Experience.

The festival attracted thousands of visitors and featured a wide range of programs combining chess with art, science, and technology. Activities included tournaments, communitiy simultaneous exhibitions led by Judit Polgár, and interactive events designed for players of all ages.

One of the highlights of the 2025 edition was the introduction of RubikChess, a mixed-pair format combining elements of chess and the Rubik’s Cube. The event also featured innovative elements such as human–robot chess interactions and global community simultaneous exhibitions connecting participants from different countries.
