= Peter Hoffmann (chess composer) =

German chess composer

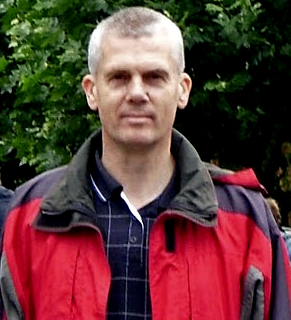
- Born: 1955 (age 70–71)
- Occupation: chess composer
- Era: 20th–21st century

Peter Hoffmann (born 1955) is a German chess composer.

Peter Hoffmann is particularly known for his contributions to the Babson Task, including the first multi-move cyclic realization in an orthodox position without promoted pieces in the initial setup.

== Biography ==
Hoffmann lives in Braunschweig, Germany, and works as a school librarian; in his free time, he is an avid hiker. In 2011, he was awarded the title of FIDE Master for Chess Composition.

== Compositional work ==
Hoffmann is active in orthodox moremovers with promotion themes. In 1986, he published a version of the Babson Task with four main echo promotions and no duals in the main lines, followed in 2009 by a version considered particularly clean with regard to secondary duals.

In 2003, he proposed in the German magazine Die Schwalbe a cyclic Babson in #4, using promoted pieces in the initial position; in 2005, he published in Schach the first cyclic version in an orthodox position without promoted pieces in the initial setup, which earned a Spezialpreis (special prize).

In addition to original compositions, Hoffmann curated two technical surveys on the Babson theme in collaboration with Erik Zierke, hosted on the specialized site BerlinThema: the monograph 100 Jahre Babson-Task im orthodoxen Direktmatt (99 pp.) and the subsequent essay Das produktivste Babson-Schema. These studies are frequently cited in recent chess composition literature.

== Publications ==
- 100 Jahre Babson-Task im orthodoxen Direktmatt (with Erik Zierke), BerlinThema, 2013– (updated).
- Das produktivste Babson-Schema (essay), BerlinThema, 2024/2025.

== Bibliography ==
- Frederic Friedel, The perfect Babson, ChessBase, 1 December 2018 (profile and survey of Hoffmann's work).
- Collection and documentation on the Babson (PDF) on BerlinThema.
- Das produktivste Babson-Schema (PDF) on BerlinThema.
