= Jason Kouchak =

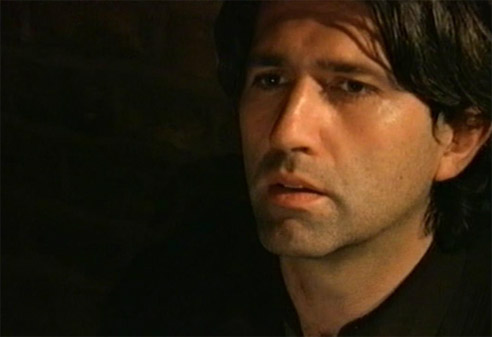

Background information
- Genres: Classical, chanson, new age
- Occupations: pianist, singer, songwriter, composer
- Instruments: piano, vocals, violin
- Years active: 1990–present
- Website: jasonkouchak.com

Jason Kouchak is a French pianist, composer and singer-songwriter.

== Early life ==
Jason Mariano Kouchak was born in Lyon, France. He was educated at Westminster School and studied classical piano at the Royal College of Music and the University of Edinburgh. He is a descendant of Alexander Kolchak, the Russian naval commander.

== Performing and recording career ==
Jason Kouchak has recorded five albums, two of which were recorded at Abbey Road Studios. He has appeared on British television network BBC and the Japanese broadcasting company NHK performing his own musical compositions. He has toured globally as a classical pianist, including Hong Kong, Singapore and Japan.

He has performed at the Royal Festival Hall (London), Salle Pleyel (Paris), and the Mariinsky Theatre (Saint Petersburg) with recitals at the Edinburgh International Festival.

Other performances include The Moon represents my Heart arranged for Julian Lloyd Webber & Jiaxin Cheng at the Chelsea Arts Club celebrating Lloyd Webber's 60th Birthday gala concert and Chopin's bicentennial Guildhall Concert with singer and actress Elaine Paige in 2010.

He has also sung in cabaret performances at the Café de Paris and the Café Royal.

Kouchak performed at the Galle Literary Festival 2012 with Tom Stoppard and in the same year gave a piano recital at the opening of the London Chess Classic. In 2012, he became the Director of Music for the 20th anniversary of the French Film Festival UK in London and Edinburgh, performing on Chopin's anniversary at the British Embassy in Paris.

== Select appearances ==
Kouchak performed his interpretation of Sakura for Emperor Akihito at London's Victoria and Albert Museum in 1998 and at the Kobe earthquake charity event in 1995. This piece was recorded with Julian Lloyd Webber on his album Cello Moods and presented by Olympic ice skater Yuka Sato in 1999. In 2017, the piece was performed at a 20-year celebration concert in Brussels for Kazuo Kodama, the Japanese Ambassador to the EU.

In 2011 and 2013, Kouchak performed the Russian song Dark Is the Night with the Royal Philharmonic Orchestra. In commemoration of the Russian Revolution 100 year anniversary, a special concert was given in 2017.

Kouchak performed Scheherazade at the official opening ceremony for the Emirates Airline Festival of Literature in March 2015 and composed the festival's official 2016 theme song. In 2017, Kouchak organised and performed at a special Suomi 100 year celebration concert at the Embassy of Finland in London.

Jason Kouchak published a music homage to Carlsen and Caruana on the eve of the World Chess Championship match 2018 entitled Victory Moves. In 2018, Kouchak also directed and composed a chess-themed ballet project with two orchestral ballet pieces at Holland Park outdoor chess set to mark the 100-year anniversary of women's rights and empowerment in the UK. In June 2019, at the Norway Chess closing ceremony, Kouchak played Edvard Grieg's Piano Concerto in A Minor and the world premier of his own composition Queen of the Knight. This performance was based on Philidor's Princess of Norway and Mozart's Queen of the Night aria reflecting the fusion of classical chess with blitz Armageddon that characterised the tournament. In July 2019, Kouchak performed at the Heart of Finland international chess tournament opening ceremony.

In spring 2020, Kouchak created an astronomy and music piece to mark the Royal Astronomical Society's 2020 bicentenary and the 60th anniversary of Yuri Gagarin's historic space flight. In spring 2021, he celebrated the ten-year anniversary of Holland Park Chess and in July, the Chessfest in Trafalgar Square. Kouchak produced the theme song of the chess festival Into the Light with a music and dance performance. The song was also performed during the exhibition Curiouser and Curiouser at the Victoria and Albert Museum in the same month.

In autumn 2021, Kouchak performed Rachmaninoff at the Royal Automobile Club to celebrate the return of the Oxford vs Cambridge Varsity match. In 2022, Kouchak wrote a musical A Queen Before Her Time about Vera Menchik, the world's best female chess player at the time, which was celebrated during the International Women's Day in London.

In July 2022, Kouchak celebrated the Platinum Jubilee of Elizabeth II with Pattie Boyd. In order to represent the Queen's years of sacrifice they created a specific chess problem on Holland Park giant chess board.

In September 2024, Jason Kouchak performed his chess-themed song "Royal Game" at the grand opening of the 45th FIDE Chess Olympiad in Budapest, Hungary for its 100 year anniversary.

In 2026, Jason Kouchak was appointed the director of chess and music at Simpson's-in-the-Strand, London.

== Public contributions ==
Kouchak's contributions include the launching of two Children's Giant Chess Sets at Holland Park, London with Stuart Conquest in 2010 and in The Meadows (park) Edinburgh in 2013 and John Tenniel's Alice in Wonderland chess set. In 2013, Kouchak led a campaign to save the famous piano department at Harrods.

He also composed the official chess charity theme song Moving Forward for CSC.

Kouchak founded the Tsubasa Children's Choir in 2011 which opened the Matsuri Festival and performed Jupiter from Holst's Planets suite in the Queen's Jubilee year 2012 at Trafalgar Square, London. In 2016, his chess and ballet musical work was performed at the British Museum and in New York celebrating the role of women as queens in chess. Kouchak choreographed and composed the theatrical stage production of the Queen's Journey in 2017 at Judit Polgar's Global Chess Festival. In 2018, he received an award as a Goodwill Ambassador of Artistic Values of Chess. In 2019, at the London Chess Conference, Kouchak contributed to education and empowerment in women's chess.

== Discography ==
- Space Between Notes (2017)
- Comme d'Habitude (2011)
- Midnight Classics (2008)
- Forever (2001)
- Watercolours (1999)
- Première Impression – 1997
- Cello Moods (Sakura only)
