= Pierre Drumare =

French chess composer (1913–2001)

- Born: 26 October 1913; Trouville-sur-Mer, France
- Died: 15 April 2001; Paris, France
- Occupation: chess composer
- Era: 20th century

Pierre Drumare (born 26 October 1913) was a French chess composer.

Pierre Drumare composed problems in a variety of genres: direct (especially multiple-move problems), retrograde analysis (including selfmates), helpmates, and fairy (heterodox).

Pierre Drumare
Memorial Camil Seneca, 1980

Position: d8 white rook, g8 black queen, h8 white bishop, f7 white pawn, b6 white knight, h6 white bishop, b5 white king, f5 white pawn, a4 white rook, b4 white pawn, c4 white pawn, e4 black pawn, f4 white rook, b3 white bishop, d3 white pawn, e3 black knight, a2 white rook, b2 black pawn, c2 black pawn, d2 black king, e2 black knight, g2 black pawn, a1 black bishop, b1 white queen, c1 black bishop, d1 black rook, e1 black rook, f1 black bishop, g1 black rook, h1 black bishop

White to play and mate in five

He is particularly known for his long-term attempt to construct a complete Babson Task over more than twenty years, from 1960 to 1982. In 1982 he published the result of his efforts in the article Mon dernier pas vers l'impossible ("My last step toward the impossible") in the magazine Thémes-64, which he had founded a few years earlier. However, the position was illegal, and Drumare acknowledged that he had not fully achieved the task. The following year, the Russian composer Leonid Yarosh succeeded in publishing a fully legal and economical complete Babson Task.

== See also ==
- Joseph Ney Babson
- Leonid Yarosh
- Babson Task
