= Harold van der Heijden =

Dutch chess composer (born 1960)

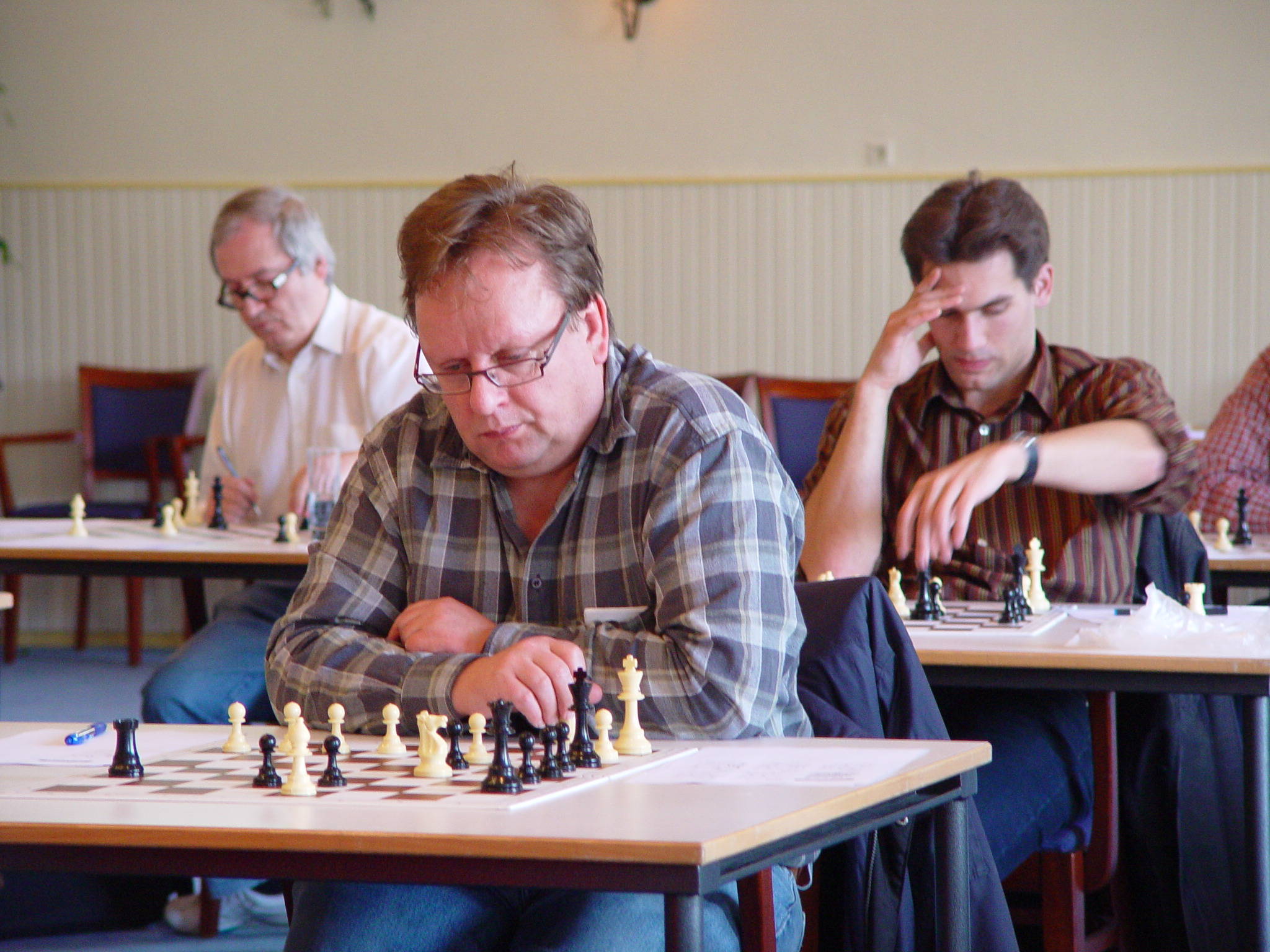
- Harold van der Heijden participating in the 2007 ARVES Dutch Endgame study solving tournament (behind left: Marcel Van Herck (Belgium), right: Martin van Essen (Netherlands)

Personal information
- Born: Harold van der Heijden; 18 December 1960 (age 65) Veghel, Netherlands

Chess career
- Country: Netherlands

Harold van der Heijden is a Dutch composer of chess endgame studies. He was born in Veghel, The Netherlands, on 18 December 1960. By profession, after finishing his PhD in 2009, he is head of the Research and Development laboratory of a veterinary institute.

His collection of endgame studies is considered to be the largest and the most comprehensive in the world. As of December 2025, it contained 103,157 studies. This collection is helpful for judges in anticipation checking. He was consulted by judges of many tourneys and also organized and/or judged several endgame study tourneys himself. In 2001 he was awarded by the Permanent Commission of the FIDE for Chess Compositions (PCCC) the title of International Judge for Chess Composition for endgame studies and in 2012 the FM title for chess composition.

He has published well over 130 of his own studies. With his 101 studies participating in tourneys, he won 28 prizes, 31 honourable mentions and 17 commendations (as of September 2014). He was appointed by the Permanent Commission of the FIDE for Chess Compositions (PCCC) as Section Director of the FIDE Album for the endgame study section starting with the 1998-2000 Album until the 2007-2009 Album.

He was editor (1989) and later chief editor (1993) of the magazine EBUR of the Dutch endgame circle ARVES. EBUR merged in 2007 with the famous international endgame study magazine EG founded by John Roycroft in 1965. He was also editor of this magazine since 1991 and took over chief editorship from John Roycroft with the merger of the magazines.

== Books ==
- Harold van der Heijden (1996): Pawn Promotion to Bishop or Rook in the Endgame Study, New in Chess, Alkmaar ISBN 90-5691-005-1
- Harrie Grondijs & Harold van der Heijden (2008): Inleiding tot de Eindspelstudie, RUEB, Rijswijk.
