= Leontxo García =

Spanish chess player (born 1956)

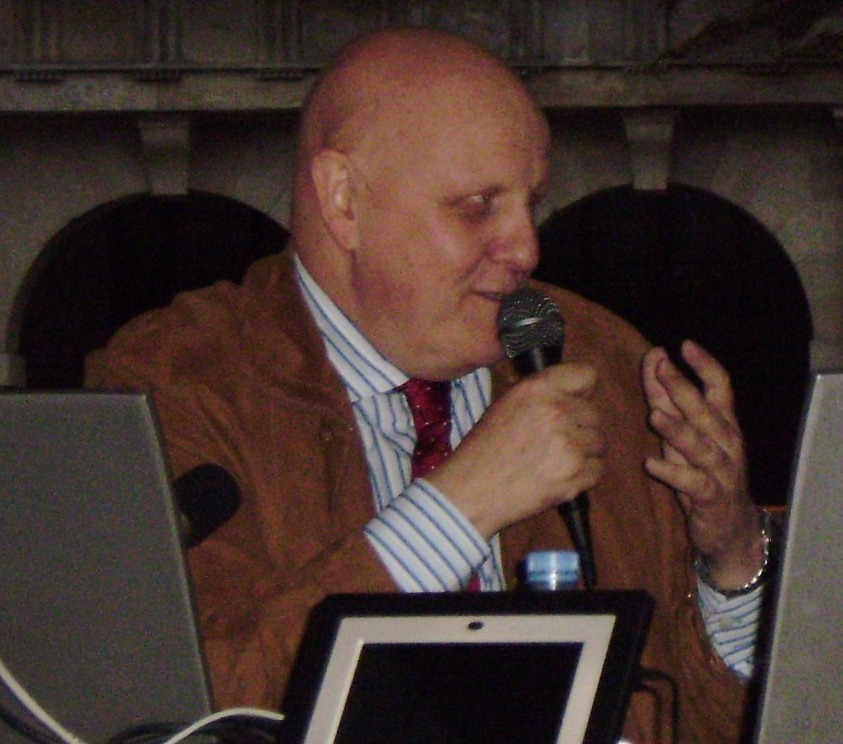

Personal information
- Born: February 12, 1956 (age 70) Irún, Guipúzcoa

Chess career
- Country: Spain
- Title: FIDE Master (1984)
- Peak rating: 2300 (January 1982)

Leontxo García Olasagasti (born February 12, 1956, in Irún, Guipúzcoa) is a Spanish lecturer, presenter, commentator and journalist specialized in chess.

== Biography ==
Leontxo García got into chess relatively late: he learned to play at school, when he was 13, but he didn't start to play seriously until he was 17. In 1975, at age 19, he became the absolute champion of Guipúzcoa and six years later, in 1981, he achieved the FIDE Master title. Later he achieved two International Master norms and everything suggested that he would remain devoted to playing chess when he was approached, in 1983, by the Basque newspaper Deia to be the special correspondent at the Kasparov–Korchnoi and Smyslov–Ribli matches (London). It was then when he discovered that his vocation as journalist was even stronger than his vocation as player, and shortly after he stopped participating in chess competitions.

From Deia Leontxo went on to Agence France-Presse, Spanish news agency EFE and La Gaceta del Norte, a former Bilbao newspaper; later he worked for the radio network Cadena SER and, finally, for El País (in 1985 he was special correspondent for two and a half months for the second Kasparov-Karpov match, in Moscow, and now he has a daily column at this newspaper) and Radio Nacional de España (1986). During those years he also worked with other media such as Radio Moscow, former magazine El Globo and, later, Argentine newspaper La Prensa.

During the World Match Kasparov–Karpov in Seville 1987 he presented 50 special programmes at Televisión Española (TVE) on a daily basis.

Leontxo ran Jaque magazine for ten years (1991–2001) and has lectured chess in many countries.

He ran and presented En Jaque (In Check), a 39 programmes series broadcast by TVE (1990–91), and produced, with Kasparov, the series La pasión del ajedrez (The passion for chess), containing 64 magazines and 25 videos, at Editorial Salvat (1998–99).

As chess instructor for the Basque Government (1985), he has experience coaching children and has taught postgraduate chess courses to school teachers.

He's broadcast on several occasions the chess commentaries of the most important tournaments, such as the Ciudad de Linares, Grand Slam Masters Final (Bilbao, Shanghai and São Paulo), World Championship, etc. But his journalist effort goes beyond the game-science; he writes about other sports (suffice it to say that he was special correspondent for El País at the Sydney 2000 Olympic Games; that he produced and presented the series Destino Atenas (Destination: Athens) about the 28 olympic sports at Radio Nacional in 2004 and that he wrote a book about Radomir Antić) and international politics. His second specialty sport is handball, and he has covered several World and Europe Championships for El País, Radio Nacional and Agencia Colpisa.

Since 2007 Leontxo has a regular section (Sundays at 09.20) at the popular programme No es un día cualquiera, with Pepa Fernández, at RNE Radio Nacional.

Tireless chess propagandist, Leontxo promotes the teaching of this game to both children (in Spanish schools and abroad) and adults. "Regular chess exercise improves brain aging and may even be useful in preventing Alzheimer's and other senile dementias", he says.

Leontxo thinks Spain needs a Rafael Nadal of chess: "It's the country with more international tournaments, about a hundred. In over a thousand schools chess is taught as an extracurricular activity... but it lacks a champion. Vallejo could have been it but he's lacked dedication. I'm confident about the Galician Iván Salgado, aged 19, junior world runner. We'll see.".

Leontxo considers that the best chess player of all time, "the most complete has been Kasparov, for his talent, work and energy. When he sat at the board, his rivals felt as though they were fighting against a force of nature".

== Prizes and awards ==
- Medal of Sporting Merit ( Consejo Superior de Deportes) 2011
- I National Chess Prize 2008 for his effort in spreading chess in 2007
- Listed in 1999 in the FIDE Golden Book "for his outstanding contribution to the development of chess"
- Awarded by the University of Oviedo for the 39 programmes of the series En Jaque, broadcast by TVE (1990–91), "for his exceptional effort in spreading culture"
- Awarded for the best coverage of the World Chess Championship 1986 in Leningrad (Saint Petersburg), awarded by the Sports Committee of the USSR
- Absolute champion of Guipúzcoa 1975

== Books ==
- Magistral Ciudad de León, 20 años de ajedrez (Magistral Ciudad de León, 20 years of chess), cowritten with Paraguayan Grand Master Zenón Franco Ocampos, Editorial MIC, 2008
- Radomir Antić: Jaque a la liga (Radomir Antić: Check to the league], Plaza y Janés, 1996. The football coach reveals his training methods, how he revolutionized Atlético de Madrid and he shows some of his action-packed life.

== Quotes ==
- "Chess is a gold mine, as yet hardly explored by the press"
- "In chess, beauty is the daughter of error"
- His phrase "Outstanding move", has become a popular internet meme (it depicts a still of him in a video showing a winning chess move)

== See also ==
- Chess
