= Martin van Essen =

Dutch chess composer

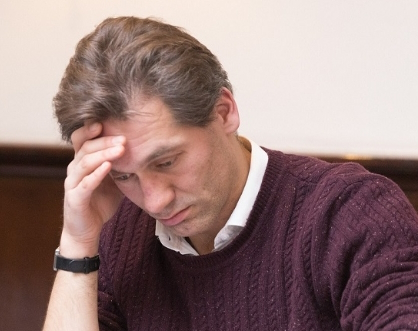
- Occupation: Chess composer
- Years active: 2000s

Martin van Essen is a Dutch chess composer of endgame studies, with compositions recorded in the Harold van der Heijden database (Volume V, updated 31 December 2015). He has earned recognition in international composition tournaments. In 2003, he won 2nd Prize in the Jubilee Tournament dedicated to journalist Tim Krabbé on his 60th birthday. In 2005, he took 2nd Prize at the Humor Study Composing Tournament, behind Ukrainian composer Serhiy Didukh. In the same year, he won 1st Prize at the Jubilee Tournament celebrating the 50th birthday of Israeli composer Amatzia Avni.

In the 2004–2006 World Championship of Chess Composition, he ranked 38th out of 47 participants in Section D (Studies).

He is also recognized for his skill in solving chess problems: in 2011, he won a Solving Championship organized by the Dutch ARVES community, a site dedicated to the composition and solving of chess studies, and he continues to participate in solving contests at national and international levels.
