= Allumwandlung =

Chess problem theme

Niels Høeg, 1905

Position: a7 white rook, e6 black king, f6 white pawn, g6 white pawn, d5 black pawn, e5 black pawn, f5 black pawn, d4 white bishop, f4 white pawn, b3 white king, d3 white pawn, f3 white pawn

Mate in three

Allumwandlung ([ˈalʊmˌvandlʊŋ], German for "complete promotion", sometimes abbreviated AUW) is a chess problem theme where, at some stage in the solution, a pawn (or sometimes pawns) is promoted variously to a queen, rook, bishop, and knight. Allumwandlung's main requirement is promotion, either a white pawn or a black pawn. A Babson task may appear if both pawns are spotted in an individual problem, corresponding one another.

== Examples ==
The diagram shows a chess problem with Allumwandlung composed by Niels Høeg and first published in 1905. White to move and mate in three. The key move (White's first move) is 1.f7, and depending on how Black defends, White promotes to either a queen, a rook, a bishop or a knight on move two. The lines are:

- 1... e4 2. f8=Q any 3. Qe7/Qf6#
- 1... Kd6 2. f8=Q+ Kc6 3. Qc5#
- 1... exf4 2. f8=R Kd6 3. Rf6#
- 1... exd4 2. f8=B Kf6 3. Ra6#
- 1... Kf6 2. f8=N exd4 3. Rf7#

The importance of White's underpromotions can be understood by considering what happens if White promotes incorrectly:

- After 1...exf4 or 1...exd4 2.f8=Q?? is stalemate, as black no longer has a legal move to play.
- After 1... exf4, 2. f8=B?? is stalemate.
- Any other promotions will not allow mate on the third move. For example, 1... Kf6 2. f8=Q+ Kxg6: there is no knight to defend the g6 pawn. Or, 1... Kd6 2. f8=R Kc6 and there is an escape on b5.
Geir Sune Tallaksen Østmoe, 2013

Position: g8 white king, a7 white pawn, c7 white pawn, e7 white pawn, f6 black king, h6 black pawn, h5 black pawn, h4 white pawn, b3 white pawn, a2 white pawn, d2 black pawn

Black to play, white to win

Another example is at right. Here, four different pawns are promoted to the four possible pieces. 1...d1=Q threatens checks on d5, g1 and g4. White's only defence is 2. e8=N+. Black can continue the pressure with 2...Kg6. Now, Qd5+ is still a threat, but 3. a8=Q?? Qd5+ 4. Qxd5 is stalemate. Instead, White defends with 3. a8=B! There are no checks available, so Black plays 3...Qd3 and now 4. c8=Q?? Qd5+ 4. Bxd5 is also stalemate. White plays 4. c8=R and has a decisive lead (Stockfish evaluation +6.7).
