= Gergely Antal =

Hungarian chess grandmaster (born 1985)

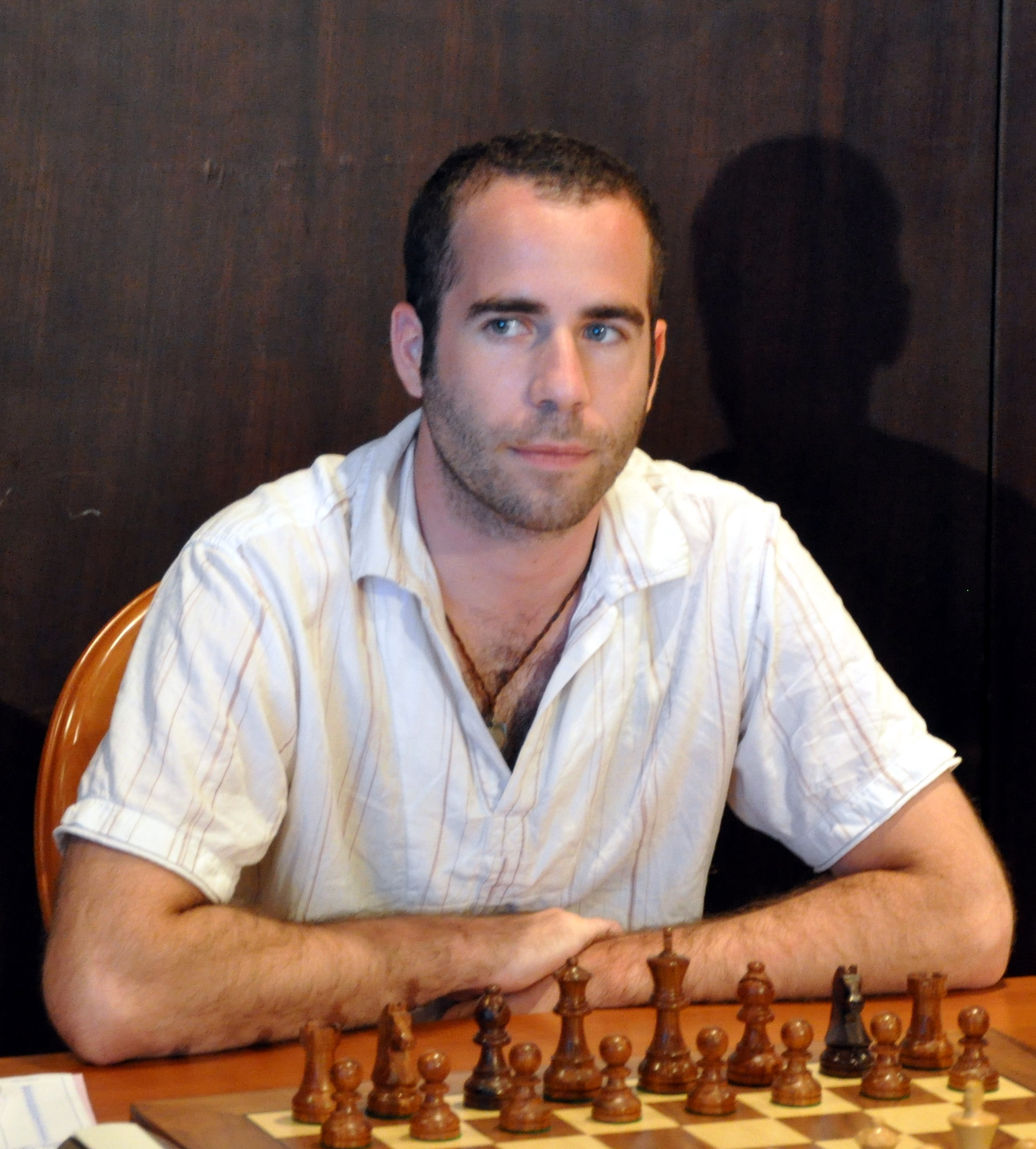
- Gergely Antal at the Pula Open, 2011

Personal information
- Born: 20 March 1985 (age 41) Budapest, Hungary

Chess career
- Country: Hungary
- Title: Grandmaster (2011)
- FIDE rating: 2541 (July 2026)
- Peak rating: 2587 (April 2024)

Gergely Antal (born 20 March 1985) is a Hungarian chess grandmaster. He became a chess Grandmaster in 2011.

Gergely Antal is the son of economist Laszlo Antal, who was a chess training partner of GM Andras Adorjan in their youth.
