= Leonid Yarosh =

Russian chess composer (born 1957)

Leonid Vladimirovič Jaroš (born 1957) is a Russian chess composer.

== Biography ==
Leonid Vladimirovich Yarosh
- Born: 1957 (age 68–69); Horycja, Chernihiv Oblast, Ukraine
- Other name
- Occupation: Chess composer
- Era: 20th–21st century

Leonid Yarosh was born in the village of Horycja in Ukraine. As a young man, he moved to Russia, settling in Kazan, where he graduated from the State Institute of Physical Culture. He initially pursued a career as a football coach.

He is best known for composing the first complete chess problem featuring the Babson task in 1983: a four-move checkmate problem with multiple promotions to four different pieces. In such a problem, White can achieve mate by promoting to the same piece chosen by Black for promotion; any other promotion fails to deliver checkmate in the prescribed number of moves. Unlike conditional or heterodox chess, White is not forced to replicate Black's promotion – success comes naturally through the Babson theme.

Leonid Yarosh
Šachmaty v SSSR, 1983
1st Prize

Position: a8 white bishop, b8 black queen, d8 white bishop, f8 white king, d7 white pawn, e7 black pawn, f7 white knight, a6 white pawn, e6 white pawn, f6 black pawn, a5 white pawn, c5 black pawn, f5 white pawn, c4 white pawn, d4 black king, f4 black bishop, h4 white rook, b3 black pawn, a2 black pawn, b2 white knight, d2 white pawn, f2 white pawn, a1 white queen, b1 white rook

White to move and mate in 4
with the Babson theme

Solution:

1. a7!

If 1... axb1=Q 2. axb8=Q Qxb2 (or 2... Qe4 3. Qxf4 Qxf4 4. Rxf4#) 3. Qxb3 Qc3 4. Qxc3#

If 1... axb1=R 2. axb8=R Rxb2 3. Rxb3 Kxc4 4. Qa4#

If 1... axb1=B 2. axb8=B Be4 3. Bxf4 Bxa8 4. Be3#

If 1... axb1=N 2. axb8=N Nxd2 3. Qc1 Ne4 4. Nc6#

Afterward, both Yarosh and other composers created additional problems incorporating the complete Babson theme.

Yarosh was a member of the Russian team that won the World Chess Composition Team Championships in 1992 and 2004. He also won the Soviet Individual Composition Championship in 1992.
