= Promotion (chess) =

Chess rule

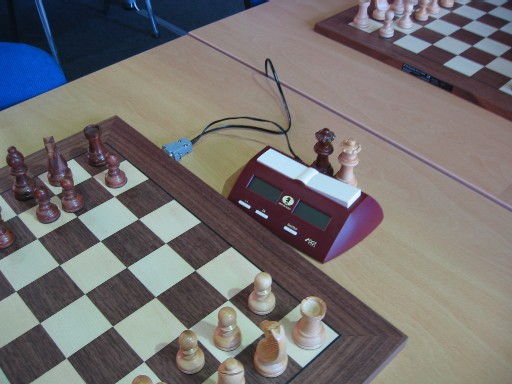
Chess set with extra black and white queens for promotion, 35th Chess Olympiad

In chess, promotion is the replacement of a pawn with a new piece when the pawn is moved to its last rank. The player replaces the pawn immediately with a queen, rook, bishop, or knight of the same color. The new piece does not have to be a previously captured piece. Promotion is mandatory when moving to the last rank; the pawn cannot remain as a pawn.

Promotion to a queen is known as queening; promotion to any other piece is known as underpromotion. Promotion is almost always to a queen, as it is the most powerful piece. Underpromotion might be done for various reasons, such as to avoid stalemate or for tactical reasons related to the knight's unique movement pattern. Promotion or the threat of it often decides the result in an endgame.

== Rules ==
When a pawn is promoted, it is removed from the board, and the new piece is placed on the square the pawn moved to. The promotion may be to any other piece (except king) regardless of whether the original piece has been captured. Consequently, a player might have two or more queens, or three or more rooks, bishops, or knights. In theory, a player could have as many as nine queens, ten knights, ten bishops, or ten rooks, though those scenarios are highly improbable.

=== Representation of promoted pieces ===
Most chess sets come with only the 32 pieces used in the starting position. Some sets come with an extra queen of each color, but this does not accommodate the possibility of having three or more pieces of the same type. When multiple sets are available, promoted pieces are borrowed from other sets if required. Under FIDE rules, a player may stop the clocks and summon the arbiter to provide a piece for promotion. (Note: Article 6.11.2 in FIDE Laws of Chess)

Under US Chess Federation rules and in casual play, an upside-down rook may designate a queen. (Note: Article "8F7. Promoted piece not available" in USCF Laws of Chess) (Note: "It is common practice, however, to play using an upside-down rook for a second queen. In the absence of a player's announcement to the contrary, an upside-down rook will be considered a queen." However, according to FIDE arbiter guidelines, such a move is treated as a legal promotion to a rook (not an illegal move, which would incur a time penalty).<ref>Arbiters' Manual 2022, 4.4.4, FIDE)

== History ==
Promotion first existed in chaturanga, an ancestor of chess created in the 6th century. In chaturanga, a pawn is promoted upon reaching the last rank of the board. Historians dispute what the pawn could be promoted to. Some sources state that a pawn can be promoted only to a mantri, an early form of the queen only able to move one square diagonally, with the idea being that a foot soldier that advanced all the way through the enemy lines was promoted to the lowest rank of officer. Others claim that the pawn, if the piece is available for promotion, is promoted to the piece initially positioned on the file on which the pawn stands, except if the pawn stands on the king's file, in which case it is promoted to a mantri. If the piece is unavailable, the pawn remains unpromoted on its square.

Chaturanga was introduced to the Middle East as shatranj around the 7th century. In shatranj, a pawn can be promoted only to a fers (equivalent to chaturanga's mantri). As chaturanga and shatranj spread to the Western world and East Asia, as well as several other regions of the world, the promotion rule evolved. (See Regional games of the chess family section for more information.)

After the queen gained its modern identity and abilities in the 15th century, replacing the farzin or ferz, some players objected to the fact that a king could have more than one queen via promotion. One old set of chess rules says, "A promoted pawn became a ferz, with the move of the queen."

In Italy, in the 18th and early 19th centuries, a pawn could be promoted only to a captured piece; if none of the promoting player's non-pawn pieces were captured, the pawn remained inactive until a piece became available, whereupon the pawn immediately assumed that piece's role. Philidor did not like the possibility of having two queens; in all editions of his book (1749 to 1790), he stated that a promotion could only be to a piece previously captured. Lambe also stated this rule in a 1765 book. A player could thus never have more queens, knights, rooks, or bishops on board than the number the player starts with. The restricted promotion rule was applied inconsistently. Jacob Sarratt's 1828 book gave unrestricted promotion. By Sarratt's time, unrestricted promotion was popular, and according to Davidson, it was universal by the mid-19th century. However, Howard Staunton wrote in The Chess-Player's Handbook, originally published in 1847, that Carl Jaenisch said that the restricted promotion rule was still in force in northern Europe, Russia, Scandinavia, and Germany. For instance, an 1836 Norwegian game-book by Peter Tidemand Malling clearly states "Queen, Rook, or any other officer that has been lost", and this wording was used as late as 1862 for the third and final reprint.

=== 1862 British Chess Association rule ===
The dead pawn rule

Position: a8 black rook, b7 white pawn, c7 black pawn, c6 white pawn, g6 black pawn, g4 black pawn, h4 black bishop, e3 black pawn, g3 black king, h3 white bishop, e2 white pawn, g2 black pawn, g1 white king

White to move

Position: a8 white pawn, c7 black pawn, c6 white pawn, g6 black pawn, g4 black pawn, h4 black bishop, e3 black pawn, g3 black king, h3 white bishop, e2 white pawn, g2 black pawn, g1 white king

Capturing the white bishop is now a stalemate.

Under Law XIII of the 1862 "Code of Laws of the British Chess Association", a pawn reaching its last rank had the option to remain as a pawn instead of being promoted. (Note: Law XIII of the 1862 "Code of Laws of the British Chess Association" states: "When a pawn has reached the eighth square, the player has the option of selecting a piece, whether such piece has previously been lost or not, whose names and powers it shall then assume, or of deciding that it shall remain a pawn.") In his 1889 work The Modern Chess Instructor, Wilhelm Steinitz, the first World Chess Champion, endorsed this rule, explaining its purpose by referring to the position diagrammed, which he cited from Johann Löwenthal's Book of the London Chess Congress, of 1862.

1.Bxg2? loses quickly after 1...Ra1+ 2.Bf1 Rb1, putting White in zugzwang, so the pawn must capture the rook. If White plays 1.bxa8=Q? or promotes to rook, bishop or knight, Black wins with 1...gxh3, whereupon 2...h2# is unstoppable. Instead, White draws by 1.bxa8=P!!, when 1...gxh3 or 1...Kxh3 stalemates White, and other moves allow 2.Bxg2, with a drawn endgame. Steinitz wrote, "We approve of the decision of the London Chess Congress, of 1862, although the 'dummy' pawn rule was denounced by some authorities." The same rule and explanation are given by George H. D. Gossip in The Chess-Player's Manual.

Promotion to a piece of opposite color

Position: f7 white rook, g7 white pawn, h7 black king, g6 white knight, h5 white king

Position: g8 black knight, f7 white rook, h7 black king, g6 white knight, h5 white king

The broad language of Law XIII appears to allow promotion to any piece of either color. This led to the whimsical joke chess problem illustrated. White is to play and checkmate in one move. No solution is possible under modern-day rules, but with Law XIII in effect, the surprising solution is 1.g8=BlackN#!!, when the newly promoted knight blocks its own king's flight square. Other amusing problems have been created involving promotion to a white or black king, which Law XIII also appears to allow.

Howard Staunton vigorously opposed the 1862 rule when it was proposed, but the tournament committee passed it by a large majority of votes. It did not catch on, however. Philip Sergeant wrote:

A correspondent in the May [1865] Chess World ... did not exaggerate when he wrote that the B.C.A. Code had been very generally rejected by British amateurs, and emphatically condemned by the leading authorities of America, Germany, and France. In particular, the absurd "dead Pawn" rule, against which Staunton had made his protest in 1862, had failed to win acceptance.

The British Chess Association code was superseded by the "Revised International Chess Code" of the London 1883 international chess tournament, under which promotion is mandatory. (Note: In its entirety, Rule 10 provided, "A Pawn reaching the eighth square must be named as a Queen or piece, at option of player, independent of the number of pieces on the board. The created Queen or piece acts immediately in its new capacity. Until the pawn has been so named the move is incomplete.")

== Strategy ==
The ability to promote is often the critical factor in endgames and thus is an important consideration in opening and middlegame strategy. A far-advanced pawn can threaten to be promoted and thus be a valuable asset. Almost all promotions occur in the endgame, but promotion can happen at any point in the game.

Due to the pawn's ability to be promoted, having an extra pawn can often be a decisive advantage. In general, a pawn is more valuable the farther advanced it is, as it is closer to promotion. As a result, it is often beneficial to place a pawn in enemy territory; even if it does not control any important squares, it may still be useful, as it forces the opponent to ensure that it is not promoted.

A passed pawn is a pawn that no enemy pawns can stop from reaching promotion. A passed pawn is highly valuable in the endgame, where few enemy pieces remain to prevent it from being promoted.

A pawn race is a situation in which each side tries to promote a passed pawn before their opponent. Usually, the first player to promote wins unless their opponent can promote immediately afterward.

== Examples ==
=== Opening promotion ===
Promotion occasionally occurs in the opening, often after one side makes a blunder, as in the Lasker Trap, which features a promotion to a knight on move seven:

1. d4 d5 2. c4 e5 3. dxe5 d4 4. e3? Bb4+ 5. Bd2 dxe3! 6. Bxb4?? exf2+! 7. Ke2 fxg1=N+!

Schlechter–Perlis, Karlsbad 1911 could have featured a promotion to queen on move 11:

1. d4 d5 2. c4 c6 3. Nf3 Nf6 4. e3 Bf5 5. Qb3 Qb6 6. cxd5 Qxb3 7. axb3 Bxb1? 8. dxc6! Be4?? 9. Rxa7! Rxa7 10. c7

Threatening both 11.cxb8=Q and 11.c8=Q. Perlis avoided the trap with 8...Nxc6!, losing more slowly.

The British grandmaster Joe Gallagher used the same tactical pattern a half-move earlier in Terentiev–Gallagher, Liechtenstein Open 1990:

1. d4 Nf6 2. Bg5 Ne4 3. Bf4 c5 4. c3 Qb6 5. Qb3 cxd4 6. Qxb6 axb6 7. Bxb8? dxc3 8. Be5?? Rxa2!

And now White could have resigned, since if 9.Rxa2, ...c2 promotes the c-pawn. In the actual game, White played 9.Nxc3, dropping a rook, and played on in a hopeless position for several more moves.

Another example occurs after the moves:

1. e4 c6 2. d4 d5 3. Nc3 dxe4 4. Nxe4 Nf6 5. Ng3 h5 6. Bg5?! h4 7. Bxf6?? hxg3 8. Be5 Rxh2! 9. Rxh2 Qa5+! 10. c3 Qxe5+! 11. dxe5 gxh2

With the dual threat of 12...hxg1=Q and 12...h1=Q, as in Schuster–Carls, Bremen 1914 and NN–Torre, Mexico 1928. If 10.Qd2 instead of 10.c3, then 10...exf2+! 11.Kd1 (11.Kxf2 Qxd2+) Qxd2+ 12.Kxd2 fxg1=Q rather than 10...Qxe5 11.dxe5 gxh2 12.Nf3 h1=Q 13.0-0-0 with a strong attack.

P. Short vs. Daly, 2006

Position: a8 black rook, d8 black queen, e8 black king, f8 black bishop, h8 black rook, a7 black pawn, b7 black bishop, d7 black knight, f7 black pawn, g7 black pawn, h7 black pawn, c6 black pawn, e6 black pawn, f6 black knight, e5 white pawn, b4 black pawn, d4 white pawn, c3 white knight, f3 white knight, a2 white pawn, b2 white pawn, e2 white bishop, f2 white pawn, g2 white pawn, h2 white pawn, a1 white rook, c1 white bishop, d1 white queen, e1 white king, h1 white rook

Position after White's 10th move

There are also a few opening lines where each side gets a desperado pawn that goes on a capturing spree, resulting in each side queening a pawn in the opening. An example is seen in P. Short–Daly, 2006 Irish Chess Championship, where play continued 10... bxc3 11. exf6 cxb2 12. fxg7 bxa1=Q 13. gxh8=Q.

Both players promoted by White's seventh move in Casper–Heckert:

1. e4 Nf6 2. Nc3 d5 3. e5 d4 4. exf6 dxc3 5. d4 cxb2 6. fxg7 bxa1=Q 7. gxh8=Q

=== More than two queens ===
Fischer vs. Petrosian, 1959

Position: g8 white queen, h8 white queen, b6 black king, c6 black pawn, d6 black queen, e5 black pawn, c4 white pawn, d4 black pawn, e4 white pawn, c3 black knight, d3 white pawn, g3 white pawn, a1 black queen, f1 white bishop, g1 white king

Position after 37.h8=Q, four queens

In master play, it is rare for one or both players to have more than one queen. One of the best-known games in which each side had two queens is Bobby Fischer–Tigran Petrosian, 1959 Candidates Tournament, illustrated in the diagram and analyzed extensively in Fischer's My 60 Memorable Games. Four queens existed from move 37 until move 44.

Szalanczy vs. Nguyen, 2009

Position: a8 white queen, g8 black knight, b7 white king, c7 white queen, f7 black pawn, g7 black queen, h7 black king, c6 white queen, d5 white knight, e4 white pawn, f2 black queen, g1 black queen

Position after 58.a8=Q, six queens

Very few games have been played with six queens; two examples are Emil Szalanczy–Nguyen, Thi Mai (2009) and David Antón Guijarro–Alejandro Franco Alonso (2011). In the first game, each side had three queens from move 58 to move 65. The game ended in a draw with a single queen on each side. In the second game, both sides also had three queens; Black ultimately resigned with each side having one queen.

=== Linares incident ===
Karpov vs. Kasparov, 1993

Position: c8 black bishop, d8 black queen, f8 black rook, g8 black king, d7 black knight, f7 black pawn, h7 black pawn, g6 black pawn, e5 white pawn, b4 black pawn, d4 white queen, e4 black knight, f4 white pawn, h4 white pawn, b3 white pawn, a2 white knight, c2 black pawn, g2 white pawn, b1 white knight, d1 white rook, e1 white king, f1 white bishop, h1 white rook

Position before 24...cxd1=Q+

An unusual incident occurred in a 1993 game between Anatoly Karpov and Garry Kasparov. When the game reached the diagrammed position, Karpov was in serious time trouble, having one minute to make 16 moves in order to reach overtime. Kasparov captured the rook on d1 with the pawn on c2 and said, "Queen!", indicating promotion to a queen. However, no queen was immediately available; it took some time for the arbiter to find a black queen. Kasparov later said that, if he had been more attentive, he would have promoted to a rook, using the black rook that had been taken on move 23.

Kasparov's clock was running while the arbiter was getting a queen, so he started Karpov's clock. Karpov immediately played 25.Qxe4, and Kasparov told him that he was in check, to which Karpov replied, "From what? It might be a bishop on d1." At this point, the clocks were stopped. The arbiter eventually found a black queen, and the game was backed up to the position after 24...cxd1=Q+. Kasparov's move was ruled to be illegal, as he had started his opponent's clock without placing the promoted piece on the square of promotion; as a result, Karpov was given two extra minutes on his clock. Regardless, Kasparov soon won the game. Kasparov later disputed that his move had been illegal.

=== Canadian championship incident ===
Sambuev vs. Noritsyn, 2017

Position: a7 white pawn, h7 white rook, g5 black pawn, b4 black pawn, e4 black king, f4 black knight, d2 black pawn, f2 white king, h2 black pawn

Position before 50...d1=R

The 2017 Canadian Chess Championship, played under FIDE rules, was controversially decided by an incorrectly executed promotion.

At the end of the regular tournament, Bator Sambuev and Nikolay Noritsyn, both former champions, were tied for first place and were required to decide the title by playoff. After a series of rapid games failed to resolve the tie, a "sudden death" blitz playoff began; pairs of games would be played, and the first player to win a game and to win or draw the reverse would win the championship.

The first blitz game was drawn. In the second game, Noritsyn had seconds remaining on the clock and was about to make his 50th move, an automatic promotion to a queen on d1. Noritsyn moved his pawn to d1, and not seeing a queen readily available (Sambuev was holding it in his hand), grabbed a rook, turned it upside down, placed it on the promotion square, and announced, "Queen!" The arbiter immediately stepped in and ruled that the newly promoted piece was in fact a rook. Noritsyn subsequently lost the game and the title. Sambuev denied that he had deliberately concealed the queen in order to make it difficult for Noritsyn to execute the queen promotion correctly in the available time. Noritsyn's appeal was dismissed.

== Underpromotion ==
An underpromotion is a promotion to a knight, rook, or bishop. Although these pieces are less powerful than the queen, there are some rare situations where underpromotion is advantageous. In practice, many underpromotions are inconsequential, described as "silly jokes" by Tim Krabbé.

Due to the knight's unique movement pattern, promotion to a knight may be useful for a variety of reasons (illustrated below). Because the queen combines the powers of the rook and the bishop, there is rarely a reason to promote to either of those pieces. Doing so is occasionally advantageous, however, usually to avoid an immediate draw by stalemate if the promotion were to a queen.

Promotion to knight or rook in practical play is rare, and promotion to bishop is even rarer, but they are a popular theme in composed chess problems, such as the Saavedra position. For example, a study by Jan Rusinek sees White promoting to knight, bishop and rook in order to induce stalemate. An Allumwandlung is a problem where promotions to all four possible pieces occur. An extreme example is the Babson task, a directmate where promotions by Black must be countered by matching promotions by White (so if Black promotes to a rook, so does White, and so on).

=== Promotion to a knight ===
Murray Chandler and Helen Milligan

Position: g8 black king, f7 black pawn, b2 white queen, d2 black pawn, f2 white king, h2 white pawn

Black to move

In the diagrammed position, 1...d1=Q? leaves material equal and leads to a drawn position. Instead, promotion to a knight with 1...d1=N+ wins by virtue of a fork: 2.K(any) followed by 2...Nxb2 leaves Black a piece up with a winning endgame.

Kamsky vs. Bacrot, 2006

Position: f3 white king, e2 black pawn, h2 white rook, f1 black king

Position before 74...e1=N+. Promotion to a knight gets to a drawn endgame.

Promotion to knight may also be done for defensive reasons. For example, a knight promotion is a standard defensive technique in a rook versus pawn endgame; a 2006 game between Gata Kamsky and Étienne Bacrot shows such a case. White threatens to capture the pawn or checkmate by Rh1 if the black pawn promotes to a queen, rook, or bishop. The only move that does not lose for Black is 74...e1=N+! The resulting rook versus knight endgame is a theoretical draw (see pawnless chess endgame). In the actual game, mistakes were made in the rook versus knight endgame, and White won on move 103.

Zurakhov vs. Koblencs, 1956

Position: c7 black king, g7 white pawn, d5 white king, f5 black knight, a4 white pawn, c3 white pawn

Position before 57.g8=N!

Position: a7 black king, c7 white pawn, a6 white pawn, b5 white king, d5 white knight, f5 black knight

Position before 79.c8=N+!

Zurakhov–Koblencs, Tbilisi 1956 is a very rare example of a game with two significant promotions to knights; it also features a rare instance of a non-checking knight promotion. In the first diagram, Black threatens 57...Nxg7, and if White avoided this by promoting to queen, rook, or bishop, Black would reach a drawn position with the knight fork 57...Ne7+ and 58...Nxg8. The only winning move is 57.g8=N!, which White played.

Twenty-one moves later, the players reached the position in the second diagram. Once again, a promotion to anything other than a knight would allow a knight fork, e.g. 79.c8=Q?? Nd6+ and 80...Nxc8, with a drawn ending. White instead played 79.c8=N+! (there are other winning moves, such as 79.Kc5) 79...Kb8 80.Kb6 and Black resigned, since White cannot be stopped from promoting a third pawn, this time to a queen.

=== Promotion to a rook ===
White to move

Position: g7 white pawn, h6 black king, g4 white king

Promotion to queen draws; promotion to a rook wins.

In the diagrammed position, Black threatens to capture White's pawn and draw the game. Promotion to a queen would result in a stalemate, whereas the move 1.g8=R! wins because White can force an elementary checkmate from the resulting position.

P. Short vs. Daly, 2006

Position: e6 white queen, f4 black queen, b2 black pawn, e2 white king, h2 black king

Position before 70...b1=R!

In the diagrammed position from the game P. Short–Daly, 2006 Irish Chess Championship, a promotion to queen would allow stalemate: 70...b1=Q?? 71.Qh3+! Kxh3 stalemate (or 71...Kg1 72.Qh1+!, and now the black king is forced to capture). Instead, the game concluded 70...b1=R! 0–1

F. Lazard
L'Opinio 1935, 2nd prize

Position: d7 white pawn, d6 black bishop, b3 black pawn, e3 black king, h3 black pawn, b2 white pawn, c2 black pawn, h2 white pawn, c1 white king

White to play and draw

Less often, promotion to rook is necessary to induce stalemate to save a draw in an otherwise hopeless position. The example shown is from the end of a study by Frédéric Lazard. Black threatens checkmate by moving the king and playing ...Bf4. Promotion to queen does not work: 4.d8=Q? Bf4 5.Qd2+ Kf3 6.Qxf4+ Kxf4, and Black easily wins the pawn ending. Promotion to rook saves the draw, however:

4. d8=R! Bf4

If 4...Bxh2, then 5.Rd3+!

5. Rd2

Now king moves by Black cause stalemate because the rook is pinned and cannot move. If Black instead moves the bishop along the c1–h6 diagonal, White can parry this with a perpetual pursuit of the bishop with the rook, so Black cannot make any progress: 5...Bg5 6.Rd5 Kf4 7.Rd2 Bh6 8.Rd6 Kg5 9.Rd2 is one possible continuation.

=== Promotion to a bishop ===
Position: a8 black king, b8 black bishop, c7 white pawn, a6 white king, c5 white knight

White to play and win

In the diagrammed position, the pawn must be advanced to c8 and promoted; otherwise, it is captured, resulting in a draw. Promotion to a queen or rook would pin the bishop, leaving Black with no legal moves, resulting in a stalemate; promotion to knight may appear to threaten checkmate via 2.Nb6#, but Black moves their bishop next turn, so there is no mate, and White cannot make any further progress. Promotion to bishop is the only way to win, threatening mate with Nd7 followed by Bb7, that the enemy bishop, being confined to dark squares, is helpless to prevent:

1. c8=B! B(any) 2. Nd7 B(any) 3. Bb7# 1–0

Hermanis Matisons
Rigaer Tageblatt, 1914

Position: a8 white king, c8 white knight, g8 black rook, b7 white pawn, c7 black rook, e5 black king

White to move and draw; position after Black's fifth move

Less often, promotion to bishop is necessary to induce stalemate to save a draw in an otherwise hopeless position. The example shown is from the end of a study by Hermanis Matisons.

Both king moves lose quickly (they can be met by 6...Rgg7, for example), so the pawn must be promoted. 6.b8=Q and 6.b8=R both lose to a capture on c8, and 6.b8=N, while leaving a stalemate after 6...Rgxc8??, loses quickly after 6...Rcxc8. This leaves only 6.b8=B!: since the c7-rook is now pinned, Black must either lose it (possibly getting the bishop in return, after 6... Rgg7 7. Bxc7+, which results in a theoretical rook versus knight draw) or play 6...Rxc8 which, with a bishop on b8 rather than a queen or rook, is stalemate.

Reshko vs. Kaminsky, 1972

Position: e8 white queen, a7 white pawn, b7 black queen, g7 black pawn, h7 black king, f6 black pawn, h6 black pawn, f5 white pawn, h5 white king, g4 white pawn, h4 white pawn

61.a8=B! is the only way to win.

In the diagrammed position from a 1972 game between Aron Reshko and Oleg Kaminsky, promotion to a queen or rook would allow 61...Qf7+! 62.Qxf7 stalemate. White could promote to a knight, but that would not be sufficient to win after 61...Qa7! White wins after:

61. a8=B! Qb3

Now 61...Qf7+?? 62. Qxf7 is not stalemate as the h8-square is not attacked by the promoted piece.

62. Qd7

Also winning is 61.a8=B Qb3 62.Bc6 Qa2 63.Bd7 Qg8 64.Qxg8+ Kxg8 65.Kg6.

62... Qg8 63. Bd5 Qf8 64. Bf7 Kh8 65. Qe8 Qxe8 66. Bxe8 Kh7 67. Bf7 Kh8

Black is in zugzwang for two moves.

68. Kg6 h5 69. Kxh5 wins.

This position has been included in several books with the move 61.a8=B! as the problem-like solution. According to Müller and Pajeken, however, the actual game continuation was 61.a8=N? Qa7 62.g5 hxg5 63.hxg5 fxg5 64.Qg6+ Kg8 65.Qc6 Qf7+? (65...Kh7! draws) 66.Kg4 1–0.

=== Insignificant underpromotions ===
Shirov vs. Kramnik, 2005

Position: c8 black king, h8 black rook, c7 black pawn, g7 black pawn, h7 black pawn, b6 black pawn, e5 black pawn, f5 black pawn, b4 white queen, f3 white pawn, g3 white pawn, a2 white pawn, c2 white pawn, e2 black pawn, f2 white king, h2 white pawn, b1 white rook, d1 black rook

Position before 25...e1=B+

In practical play, the majority of underpromotions are made when there is no real reason not to promote to a queen. These occur usually because the promoted piece is immediately captured, rendering the choice of promotion unimportant, or because the game is easily won regardless of the choice of promoted piece. One high-level example of the former occurred in the game Shirov–Kramnik, Amber Blindfold, 2005. In the diagrammed position, Black played 25...e1=B+. This underpromotion is inconsequential, as 26.Qxe1 is forced whether Black promotes to a queen or bishop.

Vidmar vs. Maróczy, 1932

Position: g8 white bishop, d7 white pawn, e7 black bishop, g7 black king, h7 white pawn, g5 black pawn, g4 white king

Position before 124.h8=B+

In 1932, a long game between Milan Vidmar and Géza Maróczy had reached an opposite-colored bishops endgame and been a theoretical draw for many moves. White promoted to bishops on two successive moves, both pieces being immediately captured by Black's king:

124. h8=B+ Kxh8 125. d8=B Kxg8

The game was drawn on move 129.

== Promotion in other games of the chess family ==
=== Western chess variants ===
Most variants of Western chess feature promotion. The promotion rule in these variants is usually similar to that of standard chess, though it is sometimes amended to cohere with the variant's rule set. In general, the following apply:

- A pawn is promoted upon reaching the last rank of the board, regardless of the board's size.
- A pawn may be promoted to any non-royal fairy piece featured in the variant. The mann, a non-royal version of the king, may be one such piece.

Due to the first guideline, a pawn on a longer board has to move further to be promoted. Some variants partially compensate for this by allowing the pawn to advance further than two squares on its initial move; for example, in the 16×16 chess on a really big board, a pawn can advance up to six squares on its first move.

The second guideline has unusual consequences in some games. For example, in Knightmate, the knight is royal while the king is not, so the player may promote a pawn to a king but not to a knight. In losing chess, the king is not royal, so a pawn can be promoted to a king.

=== Regional games of the chess family ===
Most regional games of the chess family (with the notable exception of janggi) include promotion, though the rule varies.

==== Makruk ====
In makruk, pawns begin the game on their third rank. When a pawn reaches its sixth rank, it is promoted to a Met (Makruk's queen), a piece that may move one square diagonally.

The pawn in makruk has a flat shape and can be flipped over to represent the new piece.

==== Sittuyin ====
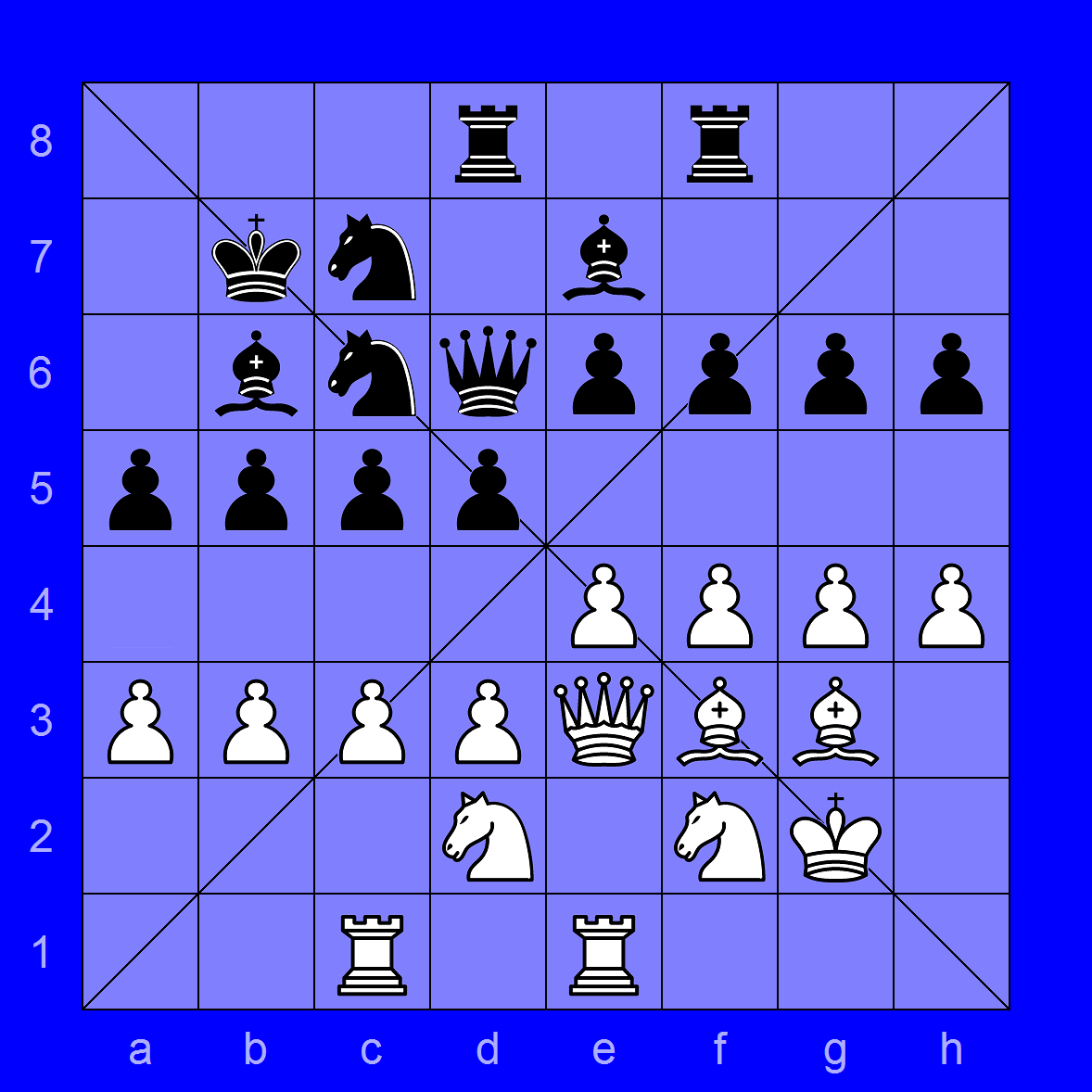
A sittuyin position after the initial setup phase. Promotion zones consist of the squares located on the two diagonal lines through the middle of the board.

In sittuyin, the promotion zone is marked by two diagonal lines, each line connecting two opposite corners of the board. A pawn standing on a promotion square on the opponent's half of the board may be promoted to a queen. Promotion can occur only if the player's queen is captured, so a player cannot have several queens at once.

A pawn is not promoted the moment it reaches a promotion square; it may be promoted only on a subsequent move. It is unclear how this promotion is effected: some sources claim that the pawn is simply replaced with the new piece as a move, but others state that the pawn moves one square diagonally like a queen and then is promoted to one within the same move, as long as this move does not give check or capture an enemy queen.

A pawn may move through a promotion square without being promoted, whereupon it loses its opportunity to do so. A pawn that reaches the back rank must remain there until captured, unless it is on a promotion square.

==== Shogi ====
Uniquely among modern games of the chess family, shogi allows almost all pieces to be promoted. Promotion usually occurs multiple times in a game of shogi.

In standard shogi, a player's promotion zone consists of the three farthest ranks of the board. A piece can be promoted when it moves into, out of, or within its promotion zone. A piece can be dropped, however, only in its unpromoted state, regardless of where it is dropped and whether it was promoted when captured, though it can then be promoted on subsequent turns.

Six of the eight types of pieces can be promoted. Unlike in chess, each piece can be promoted only to one particular piece. Two of these promoted pieces have movement patterns that are only available by promotion, and the remaining ones have the same movement as the gold general.

Promotion in shogi is usually optional; the only exception is when an exclusively forward-moving piece advances so far forward that it would have no legal move on subsequent turns if left unpromoted (e.g. a pawn moving to the last rank). Once a piece is promoted, it cannot be demoted back into its original form unless it is captured.

The ability to choose whether or not to promote is important, as some pieces lose some of their power upon being promoted (e.g. a promoted silver general can no longer move diagonally backwards); thus, there can be a legitimate reason not to promote, even though all pieces theoretically gain more than they lose upon promoting.

===== Shogi variants =====
Most shogi variants have similar promotion rules to standard shogi, where all but a few pieces have the ability to be promoted, each to one type of piece. In most variants, the player's promotion zone is bounded by the position of the opponent's pawns at the start of the game.

There are, however, some differences, especially in variants larger than shogi itself. For example, in the historical variants chu shogi and dai shogi, among others, the option of promotion is more restrictive than in the standard game: a piece can be promoted normally as it enters the promotion zone, but if it makes a move out of or wholly within the zone, it can be promoted only if it also captures another piece. Also unlike standard shogi, a forward-moving piece in these variants may be left unpromoted at the far end of the board, unable to move. Furthermore, some pieces have different promoted states depending on the variant played (e.g. a silver general is promoted to a gold general in shogi but to a vertical mover in chu shogi and dai shogi).

In maka dai dai shogi, there is no promotion zone at all; instead, pieces can be promoted only upon capturing an opponent piece. Promotion is optional if the captured piece is unpromoted but mandatory if the captured piece is promoted. This is particularly important, as many pieces' promoted forms are in fact far weaker, so these pieces will often avoid capturing promoted pieces. This variant is also unique in that the king can be promoted as well: it is promoted to a very powerful piece called the emperor, which can jump to any unprotected square on the board. The king in the three-player hexagonal variant sannin shogi can also promote, gaining the ability to move like a hexagonal chess queen and the ability to capture, without moving, any undefended pieces it could capture by moving.

Many large variants (including chu shogi, dai shogi, and maka dai dai shogi, as well as sho shogi which is a direct predecessor of standard shogi) have a piece known as the drunk elephant, which is promoted to a prince. The prince has exactly the same movements as the king and is also a royal piece; this means that, when a drunk elephant is promoted, the player has two royal pieces, and the opponent must capture both to win the game.

==== Xiangqi ====
Xiangqi has a rule that resembles promotion: the soldier, which moves and captures one point vertically forward, gains the additional ability to move and capture one point horizontally after crossing into the opposing half of the board. This does not change the piece's identity, however.

== See also ==
- Checkers § King
