= EG (magazine) =

Chess magazine

End Game (EG)
- Editor: Harold van der Heijden
- Founder: The Chess Endgame Study Circle
- Founded: 1965

EG is a magazine which publishes endgame studies and discusses various aspects of the endgame in chess. The letters "EG" signify "End Game" and also the Latin phrase exempli gratia. While many chess magazines include sections for endgame studies, EG is unique for its exclusive focus.

== History ==
The magazine was founded by The Chess Endgame Study Circle, a British group of chess endgame study composers and enthusiasts, that formed on 16 March 1965. The eleven members included Robert ″Bob″ Wade, Hugh Blandford, and John Roycroft. Roycroft was the magazine's publisher for the first 102 issues, from July 1965 until 1991. Since then the Dutch company Alexander Rueb Vereniging voor Schaakeindspelstudie (ARVES) has been the publisher, but Roycroft stayed as editor-in-chief thereafter. The current editor-in-chief is Harold van der Heijden. The magazine is focused on endgame studies but in some cases includes practical endgames in articles. Another main focus is the collection and re-publication of awards for endgame study tourneys. In October 2019, the German endgame expert Karsten Müller joined the editorial staff with his own column aimed at practical players.
