= Joke chess problem =

Humorous chess puzzle

A joke chess problem is a puzzle in chess that uses humor as an element. Although most chess problems, like other creative forms, are appreciated for serious artistic themes (such as Grimshaw, Novotny, and Lacny), joke chess problems are enjoyed for some twist. In some cases the composer plays a trick to prevent a solver from succeeding with typical analysis. In other cases, the humor derives from an unusual final position. Unlike in ordinary chess puzzles, joke problems can involve a solution which violates the inner logic or rules of the game.

== Self-solving problems ==
V. Ropke, Skakbladet 1942

Position: a8 white king, c8 black king, a7 white pawn, c7 white pawn, d7 black pawn, b6 black pawn, d6 white pawn, a4 black pawn, a3 white pawn, d3 white pawn

White to play and mate in 6

Some chess puzzles are not really puzzles at all. In the diagram, White is asked to checkmate Black in six moves. The joke in this case is that, by the rules of chess, White has no choice in the matter; the only legal moves lead directly to the "solution":

1. d4 b5 2. d5 b4 3. axb4 a3 4. b5 a2 5. b6 a1=any 6. b7#

Tim Krabbé provides other examples on his chess website.

== Offbeat interpretations of the rules of chess ==
Position: a8 black rook, a7 black king, b7 white pawn, c7 white rook, a5 white king

Mate in 1

Some composers have relied on real or perceived ambiguities or loopholes in the rules of chess to create humorous puzzles. The diagram on the right shows one such example. According to chess legend, a composer stipulated, "White mates in one move." It appears to be impossible to mate in one move and now is, but when it was presented, the promotion rule did not specify the color of the piece to which a pawn may be promoted; thus, the "solution" is for White to promote to a black knight on b8, which deprives the black king of a potential flight square (as the king cannot capture friendly pieces), and ends the game via a discovered checkmate by the white rook on c7. Similar problems have been created involving promotion to kings or pawns.

Tim Krabbé, 1972

Position: e6 white pawn, d5 black pawn, c4 black pawn, g4 black pawn, b3 black pawn, c3 white pawn, e3 black king, f3 white pawn, g3 white pawn, h3 black pawn, b2 white pawn, h2 white pawn, a1 white rook, e1 white king, h1 white rook

Mate in 3

A more sophisticated example was composed by Tim Krabbé and relied on a loophole that supposedly existed in the definition of castling. In the diagram, White must mate in three moves. The solution begins 1. e7, then the two main variations are:

- 1... Kd3 2. e8=Q gxf3 (other moves allow Qe2#) 3. 0-0-0#
- 1... Kxf3 2. e8=R! (an underpromotion), and now:
  - 2... d4 3. 0-0#
  - 2... Kg2 3. 0-0-0-0#!
Josef Klinger, 1980s

Position: e7 white pawn, g7 white bishop, g3 white rook, a2 black king, e1 white king, h1 white rook

Mate in 2

In the final line, White "vertically castles" with their newly promoted rook (and notated as "0-0-0-0"), moving the king two ranks upward to e3 and the rook downward to e2 just below the white king, checkmating the black king. Krabbé claimed that under the rules of chess at the time, this move was arguably legal because the rook had not moved yet, and further claimed that FIDE subsequently amended the rules to require that the castling rook must occupy the same rank as the king. In reality, no such amendment occurred, as the original FIDE Laws from 1930 already stated that the rook and king had to occupy the same rank.

In the third diagram, the solution begins with 1. e8=R Kb1 2. 0-0-0-0#, vertically castling by moving the king to e3 and rook to e2, much akin to that of Krabbé's example above.

== Unusual piece placement or movement ==
Some problems are notable for extremely unusual patterns of piece placement. For example, direct mates and especially helpmates have been composed with the pieces in the shape of a letter or number, or even a tree.

=== The "back home task" ===
M. Kirtley, The Problemist 1986

Position: d8 white queen, a7 black pawn, a6 white pawn, b6 white pawn, f6 black pawn, a5 white rook, f5 white pawn, b4 black pawn, c4 white pawn, f4 black pawn, h4 white pawn, a3 white knight, e3 white bishop, f3 white knight, a2 black king, b2 black rook, e2 white bishop, f2 white king, h2 white pawn, e1 white rook

Selfmate in 8

In this problem by M. Kirtley, the final position echoes a familiar pattern. Krabbé calls this problem the "back home task", as all eight white pieces retreat to their initial positions. He writes that "Strategy and deep themes are absent, Black only has forced moves, but it's one of the funniest chess problems I ever saw." White must selfmate in eight moves; i.e., they must force Black to checkmate White against Black's will. The solution is:

1. Nb1+ Kb3 2. Qd1+ Rc2 3. Bc1 axb6 4. Ra1 b5 5. Rh1 bxc4 6. Ke1 c3 7. Ng1 f3 8. Bf1 f2#

=== The "caterpillar theme" ===
G. Bridgewater, Chess 1936

Position: a8 black king, a7 white pawn, b7 black pawn, b6 black pawn, b5 black pawn, f5 white bishop, b4 black pawn, f4 white king, b3 black pawn, a1 white rook

Mate in 6

Krabbé named the "caterpillar theme" for problems and studies where doubled or tripled pawns move one after the other. The diagram at the right has White forcing mate in six moves. The solution is:

1. Bb1 b2 2. Ra2 b3 3. Ra3 b4 4. Ra4 b5 5. Ra5 b6 6. Be4#

Krabbé wrote a whole article on the caterpillar theme, citing about ten examples.

W. A. Shinkman, 1887

Position: a8 black king, a7 white pawn, a6 white pawn, a5 white pawn, a4 white pawn, a3 white pawn, a2 white pawn, a1 white rook, e1 white king

Mate in 8

The American composer William A. Shinkman (1847–1933) is famous for composing the problem in the diagram, with sextupled pawns on the a-file. As Krabbé writes on his website, "The solution, as it should be in a joke, is not difficult: 1. 0-0-0 Kxa7 2. Rd8 Kxa6 3. Rd7 Kxa5 4. Rd6 Kxa4 5. Rd5 Kxa3 6. Rd4 Kxa2 7. Rd3 Ka1 8. Ra3#".

The problem is "cooked" (ruined, in the lingo of chess composition), however, because 1.Kd2 also forces mate in eight moves. But this problem was not intended to be a sound mate in eight, and was instead intended to be a proof game in 34 moves with seven consecutive captures by Black.

== Humour in more traditional chess problems ==
Humour is a component of some traditional themes, such as grotesque and Excelsior.

In 2004, Hans Böhm sponsored a chess composing tournament for humorous endgame studies. The top two entries appear with solutions on Krabbé's website.

== Chess problem riddle ==
T. R. Dawson

Position: f8 black king, h8 white king, e7 black pawn, g6 white pawn, h6 white pawn, e5 black queen, g5 black knight, h5 white bishop

White to play

In this kind of problem, although the problem is posed as a standard chess problem, the solution has nothing to do with chess moves. An example is this problem composed by British composer Thomas Rayner Dawson:

In the position in the diagram, Black had decided to resign (although it wasn't his turn). White advised his opponent not to give up so quickly. "But I am bound to lose, and there is nothing I—or you, for that matter—can do," said Black. But White insisted: "I'll bet you $100 that I can lose!" So the two made the bet and White actually lost. He did not resign, lose on time, or anything like that. How did he lose?

The solution is in the words (i.e. it is a riddle): White did not lose the game of chess (which is impossible in the diagram position, as White is in check and the only legal moves are 1.g7+ Qxg7+ 2.hxg7#), but rather the bet itself, by failing to lose the chess game.

== See also ==
- Sam Loyd
