= Motif (chess composition) =

In chess composition, a motif is basic element of a move in the consideration why the piece moves and how it supports the fulfillment of a stipulation. Any move may and often does contain multiple motifs. Some composition schools put specific emphasis on motivation in chess problems, especially strategical school and Slovak school.

A composition where a maximum number of a certain motif occurrences is shown is called a task, even if the term task is more general.

== Classification of motifs ==
Motifs may be classified according to various viewpoints. In the usual twomovers they might be:

- Positive - those working towards the accomplishment of the stipulation
  - Attacking - positive motifs of white moves
  - Weakening - negative motifs of white moves
- Negative - those tending to hinder the accomplishment of the stipulation
  - Defensive - negative motifs of black moves
  - Harmful - positive motifs of black moves

Similar classification is valid for all directmates, selfmates, reflexmates and other problems with antagonistic aims of sides, while for helpmates and other help-problems only positive/negative level is applicable.

== Contents of motifs ==
The basic orthodox motifs are:

- Preventing the move of other unit (includes taking of a flight of the king)
- Allowing the move of other unit (includes creating of a flight of the king)
- Guarding of some square or line
- Unguarding of some square or line
- Attacking of king (checking)

In fairy chess some other motifs are possible.

== Forms of motifs ==
Any of the above-listed motifs may be presented in various forms. In orthodox chess problems these forms include:

- Capture (prevents move of captured unit, allows move of king to square previously guarded by captured piece)
- Line opening (allows move of pieces along opened line, guards square on the opened line, checks by opening the line)
- Line closing (prevents move of pieces along closed line, unguards square on the closed line, removes checks by closing the line)
- Blocking (prevents move of the king or any other piece to the blocked square)
- Unblocking (allows move of the king or any other piece to the unblocked square)
- Pinning (prevents move of pinned piece, unguards square previously guarded by pinned piece)
- Unpinning (allows move by the unpinned piece, guards square by unpinned piece)
- Exchange sacrifice

In the fairy chess, other forms of motifs are possible, e.g., allowing the move by a grasshopper by providing the hurdle or allowing the capture by a piece by patrolling in Patrol chess.

While studies also may contain problem motifs, they often contain usual tactical motifs.
