= Glossary of chess problems =

The glossary of chess problems explains commonly used terms in chess problems, in alphabetical order.

For a list of:

- unorthodox pieces used in chess problems, see Fairy chess piece;
- terms used in chess in general, see Glossary of chess;
- terms specific to computer chess, see Glossary of computer chess terms;
- chess-related games, see List of chess variants.

== A ==
actual play
See post-key play.
Albino
A chess problem theme in which, at some point in the solution, a white pawn on its starting square makes each of its four possible moves (forward one square, forward two squares, capture to the left, capture to the right). If the same behaviour is exhibited by a black pawn, it is a Pickaninny theme.
Allumwandlung
A chess problem theme in which the solution includes pawn promotions to all possible pieces (in orthodox chess, to bishop, knight, rook and queen; in fairy chess, possibly to fairy pieces).
anti-Bristol
The interference of one black piece by another like-moving one on the same line (if the pieces are on different lines, it is a Holzhausen).
anticipation
If the theme and setting of a particular problem has already appeared in an earlier problem without the knowledge of the later composer, the problem is said to be anticipated. The position does not have to be exactly the same, just very similar. Where this is done deliberately by the later composer, the term plagiarised is used. There is a real chance of anticipation if the problem has a relatively simple theme, since there are only a finite number of positions and themes, and chess problems have been composed for hundreds of years. Anticipations are not always noticed immediately, however.
aristocrat
A problem in which no pawns are in the initial position.

== B ==
Babson task
A problem in which black promotion defences to all possible pieces are answered by a promotion of the same white piece—an extreme form of Allumwandlung.
battery
A pair of pieces, where the front piece moves away to discover an attack from the back piece. For example, if a white knight stands between a white rook and the black king, moving the knight – that is, "firing" the battery – results in check.
block
A problem in which the key provides no threat, but instead puts Black in a position of zugzwang, where every move leads to a mate. In a complete block, all of Black's moves have mates provided in the set play and the key is simply a waiting move; in an incomplete block, not all black moves are provided with mates in the set play – the key provides for those that do not; in a mutate, some of the mates provided in the set play are changed following the key.
by-play
Variations not directly connected to the problem's theme.

== C ==
clearance
In general, the movement of one piece so that another can move to a particular square. In square vacation, the first piece moves so that the second can occupy the square where it stood. In line vacation, the first piece moves so that the second can pass over the square on which it stood on the way to its destination; line clearance, also known as the Bristol, is a particular type of line vacation in which a piece moves along a line so that another piece can move a shorter distance behind it along the same line.
composition
A constructed position (as opposed to a position found in a game) serving as a chess problem or chess puzzle.
cook
A second key move, unintended by the composer. A cook is a serious flaw, and invalidates a problem. The publication of cooked problems was once common, but in the modern era computers can be used to check for cooks, and cooked problems are rarely published.
cylindrical board
A board in which a- and h-files are considered connected (a "vertical cylinder"), or the first and eighth ranks are connected (a "horizontal cylinder"). A combination of the vertical and horizontal cylinders (a toroidal board) is called an anchor ring.

== D ==
directmate
A type of problem where White, moving first, is required to checkmate Black in a specified number of moves against any defence. Such a problem is usually indicated by the stipulation "mate in two" (or however many moves is necessary) or "checkmate in two". The term directmate distinguishes these sorts of problems from helpmates, selfmates, reflexmates and others.
domination
In studies, a situation whereby a piece has relatively wide freedom of movement but nevertheless must be lost.
doubling
A manoeuvre in which two pieces are placed on the same line (rank, file or diagonal) such that they support each other. Special cases are Turton doubling and Zepler doubling.
dual
Ideally, White should have only one move at each juncture that solves a problem (unless the plan is conceptual such as in the well-known "Trojan Horse Puzzle" study by Ben Schultz). Barring examples such as these, if White has an alternative at any stage but the first move, this is a dual; if multiple winning moves are available at the start, this is a cook. A dual is not as serious of a flaw as a cook; and, in minor lines, duals may be permissible (although opinions differ on this point). Some problems make a virtue out of dual avoidance: of two apparently equivalent White moves, only one works.
duplex
A type of problem in which there are two solutions, the second one reversing the roles of the colours in the first. The most common type is the duplex helpmate, in which the two solutions are: Black moves first and cooperates with White to be mated; and White moves first and cooperates with Black to be mated.

== E ==
economy
Economy is generally regarded as a good thing in chess problem composition, though exactly what is meant by it, and exactly what it is most important to be economical with, is open to debate. Economy of material or force (not using more pieces than necessary), economy of space (using the chessboard to its fullest, not cramming all the pieces into one corner) and economy of motivation (keeping all lines in the solution relevant to the theme) are all regarded as important.
Excelsior
A chess problem theme in which a pawn on its starting square in the initial position moves the length of the board to be promoted during the course of the solution. Named after one such problem by Sam Loyd; see Excelsior (chess problem).

== F ==
fairy chess
Chess played with non-orthodox rules. Examples are circe, maximummers, problems with unorthodox pieces (fairy pieces) and problems with unorthodox boards (such as cylindrical boards, or grid boards).
field
See king's field.
flight square
A square to which a checked king can legally move (that is, one not guarded by an opponent's piece, and not occupied by a friendly piece). If, prior to being checked, the player moves a friendly piece to a potential flight square and thereby decreases the king's mobility, it is a self-block. Similarly, if a player moves a friendly piece out of a potential flight square prior to check, it is square vacation.

== G ==
grid board
A kind of board used in fairy chess that is divided into a grid of sixteen 2×2 squares. For a move to be legal, the moving piece must pass over at least one of these grid lines.
See also Grid chess.
Grimshaw
A common device featuring two black pieces mutually interfering with each other on a single square.
grotesque
A problem or study with an especially unnatural initial position, particularly one with large amounts of material or with a large material disparity between the sides.

== H ==
heavy
Adjective applied to a problem with a relatively large number of pieces in the initial position. Heaviness should be avoided where possible, in the interests of economy.
Antonym: light.
helpmate
A type of problem where White and Black cooperate to put Black in mate within a specified number of moves. Unless otherwise specified, Black moves first in helpmates.
See also duplex.
Holzhausen
The interference of one black piece by another like-moving one on a different line (if the pieces are on the same line, it is an anti-Bristol).

== I ==
ideal mate
A pure mate in which all units of both colours take part in the mate.
illegal position
A position that is impossible to reach in a game by any sequence of legal moves.
interference
The closure of the line of one piece by a second piece, thus limiting its movement and cutting it off from certain squares. Various names are given to particular types of interference, among them Grimshaw, Novotny, anti-Bristol, Holzhausen, Würzburg–Plachutta and Plachutta.

== K ==
key
The first move of a solution. A problem that, unintentionally, has more than one key is said to be cooked.
king's field
The set of squares—horizontal, vertical and diagonal—adjacent to the square occupied by a king. The squares to which the king might ordinarily move, unless attacked by enemy pieces. Inspection of the field is important in both problems and real gameplay to evaluate threats, and to confirm checkmate.

== L ==
Lacny
A theme in which defences a, b and c are answered by the continuations A, B and C respectively in one phase of play and by B, C and A respectively in another.
light
Adjective applied to a problem with a relatively small number of pieces in the initial position. Lightness is usually desirable in the interests of economy.
Antonym: heavy.

== M ==
maximummer
A problem in which Black must make the geometrically longest moves available to them, as measured from square-centre to square-centre. If two or more longest moves of equal length are available, Black may choose between them. This stipulation is most often attached to selfmates.
meredith
A problem with no less than eight and no more than twelve pieces on the board in the starting position. A problem with less than eight pieces is a miniature.
miniature
A problem with no more than seven pieces on the board in the initial position.
model mate
A pure mate in which all white units, with the possible exception of king and pawns, are involved in the mate. A particular feature of problems by members of the Bohemian School.
more-mover
A directmate with the stipulation "White to move and checkmate Black in no more than n moves against any defence" where n is greater than 3. In composition tourneys, there are often separate classes for more-movers, two-movers and three-movers (as well as classes for helpmates, selfmates and others).
motif
An element of a move in the consideration why the piece moves and how it supports the fulfillment of the problem stipulation.
mutate
A type of block problem in which at least one mate in the set play is changed following the key.

== N ==
Novotny
A sacrificed white piece can be taken by two differently moving black pieces—whichever piece makes the capture, it interferes with the other. Essentially a Grimshaw brought about by a white sacrifice on the critical square.

== O ==
obtrusive piece
A piece in a chess problem that is legally placed and could only have been created through promotion. It does not include pieces promoted after the initial problem position.
orthochess
Synonym for orthodox chess.
orthodox chess
Chess according to FIDE's The Official Laws of Chess; see Rules of chess.

== P ==
phase
After the key, after tries and set play each constitutes a phase of play. A problem with set play is said to have two phases (the set play being one phase, the post-key play being another); a problem with three tries would be a four-phase problem (each try being one phase, with the post-key play the fourth). Plays in different phases sometimes relate to each other.
Pickaninny
A chess problem theme in which, at some point in the solution, a black pawn on its starting square makes each of its four possible moves (forward one square, forward two squares, capture to the left and capture to the right). If the same behaviour is exhibited by a white pawn, it is an Albino. (The term, which derives from an archaic reference to small black children, has a derogatory meaning in modern English.)
Plachutta
A theme in which a sacrificed white piece can be taken by two similarly moving black pieces, but whichever piece makes the capture, it interferes with the other. Essentially a pair of Holzhausen interferences (or a Würzburg–Plachutta interference) brought about by a white sacrifice on the critical square.
post-key play
The play following the key, that is, the lines of play that fulfill the stipulation of the problem. This is opposed to set play and virtual play (both of which may also be important elements in the attractiveness of a problem).
problem
Together with chess study is part of a chess composition.
proof game
A type of problem in which the job of the solver is to construct a game of a given number of moves in which the final position is the one given by the composer. A kind of retrograde analysis.
pure mate
A mating position in which each of the king’s potential moves to an adjacent square is prevented in exactly one way: either occupied by a friendly man or attacked by a single hostile man, but not both (unless such an attacking man is pinning a friendly man to the king to prevent it from interposing to block the check).
puzzle
Synonym for composition.

== R ==
reflexmate
A selfmate in which both sides must deliver checkmate if they are able to do when it is their move. A problem where this stipulation applies only to Black is a semi-reflexmate.
retrograde analysis
Or retroanalysis. Deduction of the move or moves leading up to a given position. A problem may be completely made up of retrograde analysis (as in a proof game, or a problem in which the task is to determine Black's last move, for example), or it may be a part of some larger problem (for example, it may be necessary to determine that Black has moved their king leading up to a given position, meaning they are unable to castle, and thus rendering correct a solution that otherwise would be incorrect).
round trip
A piece leaves a square, and then later in the solution returns to it by a circuitous route (for example, a rook moves e3–g3–g5–e5–e3).
Cf. switchback, in which the route taken to the original square is direct.
royal piece
In the context of chess variants, a piece subject to check and checkmate, as the king is in orthodox chess. Any piece can be royal; a royal piece moves according to its piece type. Variants in which kings are not royal may allow promotion to a king and disallow castling.

== S ==
S
In algebraic chess notation, the letter N is used to indicate the knight. In chess problems, however, the letter S (representing Springer, German for "knight") is often used instead, while N is reserved for the nightrider, a popular fairy piece.
selfmate
A type of problem where White forces Black to mate them against Black's will within a specified number of moves.
seriesmover
A problem in which one side makes a series of moves without reply.
set play
Play that is possible from the initial position of a problem if the other player moves first. For example, in a directmate, set play consists of lines of play starting with a Black move (rather than a White move). When set play exists, the key move may be something that does not change the set play lines, in which case the problem is a complete block, or the lines in the set play may change, in which case the problem is a mutate. Set play is one phase of play.
solus rex
Or rex solus. When either colour (though usually Black) has only their king left. The term is derived from Latin and literally means "lone king".
switchback
A piece leaves a square, and then later in the solution returns to it by the same route (for example, a rook moves e3–e5–e3).
Cf. round trip, in which the route taken back to the original square is circuitous.

== T ==
task
Chess problem or study with a record content or with highly unusual, bizarre theme, e.g., Babson task or Valladao task.
theme
The underlying idea of a problem, which gives it logic, coherence and beauty.
threat
A move or variation that White plays (usually following their key) if Black does nothing to defend against it. Problems with no threats following the key are blocks.
three-mover
A problem with the stipulation "White to move and checkmate Black in no more than three moves against any defence". In composition tourneys, there are often separate classes for three-movers, two-movers and more-movers (as well as classes for helpmates, selfmates and others).
try
A move that almost solves a problem, but is defeated by a single Black defence, as opposed to the key (which actually does solve the problem). Variations after tries are called virtual plays and may be an important part of what makes some problems pleasing.
Turton doubling
A kind of doubling in which one piece moves along a line allowing a second to move onto the same line in front of it; this second piece then moves in the opposite direction to the first. Named after Henry Turton.
Cf. Zepler doubling.
twin
Two or more problems that are slight variations on each other, often composed by the same person. The variation is usually brought about by adding, removing or moving a piece in the initial setup.
two-mover
A problem with the stipulation "White to move and checkmate Black in two moves against any defence". In composition tourneys, there are often separate classes for two-movers, three-movers and more-movers (as well as classes for helpmates, selfmates and others).

== U ==
unblock
To create a flight square, or a move that creates a flight square.
uncapture
To reverse a capture, or a move that reverses a capture. Used in describing retrograde analysis.

== V ==
version
Said of a problem that is an adaptation of an earlier one (it may have been altered to improve its economy or to eliminate a cook).
virtual play
The play following a try, as opposed to set play and post-key play.

== W ==
Würzburg–Plachutta
Mutual interference between two like-moving black pieces on different lines; essentially a pair of Holzhausen interferences where piece A interferes with pieces B in one variation, and piece B interferes with piece A in another. If the interference is brought about by a white sacrifice on the critical square, it is a Plachutta.

== Z ==
Zepler doubling
A kind of doubling in which one piece moves along a line allowing a second to move onto the same line behind it; the first piece then moves again in the same direction as before. Named after Erich Zepler.
Cf. Turton doubling.
