= Plachutta =

Device found in chess problems

The Plachutta is a device found in chess problems wherein a piece is sacrificially positioned in blockade to deny coverage of multiple distant squares required by the opposition. For example, two of an opponent's bishops, queen, or rooks are defending locations through an intersection square, and an enemy unit moved into that square blocks disrupts coverage in such a way that, even if captured, the previous defensive situation cannot be restored.

The Plachutta is named after Joseph Plachutta (1827–1883), and related to a number of other problem themes: it can be regarded as a Würzburg–Plachutta brought about by a sacrifice on the critical square (a Würzburg-Plachutta itself being a pair of Holzhausen interferences); or it can be thought of as a Novotny with similarly moving (rather than differently moving) black pieces involved (a Novotny itself being a Grimshaw brought about by a white sacrifice on the critical square). It can also be compared to the anti-Bristol, in which two similarly moving black pieces interfere with each other along the same line.

== Examples ==
=== 1. ===
William Shinkman, White Rooks, 1910

Position: d8 black king, h8 white king, a7 white rook, d7 black pawn, g7 white rook, a6 black pawn, d6 white pawn, d4 white pawn, a2 black queen, g2 black bishop

White to play and mate in three.

The problem to the right is a relatively simple example by William Shinkman, published in White Rooks, 1910. It is a mate in three (white moves first and must checkmate black in three moves against any defence). The key (first move of the solution) is 1.d5!. Examining the initial position reveals why this works: white would like to play either 1.Ra8 or 1.Rg8, but the former is prevented by black's bishop and the latter is prevented by black's queen. 1.d5 blocks the paths of both black pieces to these squares, and whichever black piece takes the pawn interferes with the other and has to defend against both threats itself (to use chess jargon, it becomes overloaded). So, if 1...Qxd5 white can play 2.Ra8+ Qxa8, when the queen is deflected from her defence of g8, allowing 3.Rg8#, while if 1...Bxd5 white can play 2.Rg8+ Bxg8, deflecting the bishop from defence of a8, allowing 3.Ra8#.

=== 2. ===
D. J. Densmore, Gazette-Times, 1916

Position: b8 black rook, g8 white bishop, a7 black rook, e7 white rook, d6 white knight, b5 white rook, d5 black knight, e5 white bishop, f5 black pawn, a3 black pawn, f3 white king, e2 white knight, h1 black king

White to play and mate in three.

To the right is another relatively simple example, but this time it is two rooks, rather than bishop and queen, involved in the interferences. The problem, by D. J. Densmore, published in the Gazette-Times, 1916, is another mate in three. The key is 1.Nb7!, which interferes with both rooks and so threatens both 2.Rh7# and 2.Rb1#. Black can defend with Raxb7, but this overloads the capturing rook, so white can play 2.Rb1+ Rxb1 3.Rh7#. The other capture is similar: 1...Rbxb7 2.Rh7+ Rxh7 3.Rb1#. Whichever rook captures, it interferes with the other and becomes overloaded, having to defend against two threats on its own.

=== 3. ===
Aleksandr N. Pankrat'ev & Josip Varga,
Sahovski Glasnik, 1991

Position: d7 white knight, a6 black pawn, d6 white pawn, e6 white king, h6 black bishop, a5 white bishop, d5 white rook, e5 black pawn, f5 black pawn, a4 white bishop, c4 black king, d4 white pawn, e4 black pawn, a3 black rook, f3 white pawn, a2 black knight, c2 white pawn, e2 white pawn, h2 black queen, b1 black rook, d1 white knight

White to play and mate in four.

A more sophisticated modern example is the award-winning mate-in-four problem to the right by Aleksandr N. Pankrat'ev and Josip Varga, which was published in Sahovski Glasnik in 1991 and won 1st prize. White begins with 1.e3, adding protection to d4 and threatening 2.Rc5#. Black's two main defenses are the two captures on e3, but each one allows a different Plachutta interference by White on move 2. If 1...Rxe3, White plays 2.f4!, a Plachutta interference with the queen and bishop: 2...Qxf4 allows 3.Nxe3+ Qxe3 4.Nxe5# and 2...Bxf4 allows 3.Nxe5+ Bxe5 4.Nxe3#. If 1...Bxe3, White plays 2.Bb3+!, a Plachutta interference with the two black rooks: 2...Rbxb3 allows 3.Nxe3+ Rxe3 4.Nb6# and 2...Raxb3 allows 3.Nb6+ Rxb6 4.Nxe3#.

- 1.e3 anything-else 2. Rc5#
- 1.e3 Rxe3 2.f4 Qxf4 allows 3.Nxe3+ Qxe3 4.Nxe5#.
- 1.e3 Rxe3 2.f4 Bxf4 allows 3.Nxe5+ Bxe5 4.Nxe3#.
- 1.e3 Bxe3 2.Bb3+ Rbxb3 allows 3.Nxe3+ Rxe3 4.Nb6#.
- 1.e3 Bxe3 2.Bb3+ Raxb3 allows 3.Nb6+ Rxb6 4.Nxe3#

=== 4. ===
Tarrasch vs. Allies, Naples 1914

Position: c8 black rook, g8 black rook, d7 black queen, h7 black pawn, a6 black pawn, h6 black bishop, a5 white pawn, b5 black king, c5 black pawn, e5 white bishop, b4 black pawn, d4 black pawn, f4 white pawn, b3 white pawn, d3 white pawn, f3 white queen, c2 white rook, g2 white pawn, h2 white pawn, c1 white rook, g1 white king

White (Tarrasch) to move

Although the term Plachutta is confined to the world of chess problems, not being used in a wider chess context, the underlying Plachutta pattern does occasionally (though rarely) appear in an actual game. One example is to the right, a position which occurred in a 1914 game between Siegbert Tarrasch (with white) and a team of opponents consisting of Davide Marotti (who became the champion of Italy in 1921), E. Napoli, de Simone, and del Giudice. In the diagrammed position, the black queen defends against Qb7 and the rook on c8 defends against Rxc5. Tarrasch played 31.Bc7!, a Plachutta interference after which black cannot maintain control over both b7 and c5 (Black actually resigned after this move). If 31...Rxc7 the rook is overloaded, having to look after both the key squares: 32.Qb7+ Rxb7 and the rook is deflected from defence of c5, allowing 33.Rxc5#. If instead 31...Qxc7 it is the queen which is overloaded: 32.Rxc5+ Qxc5 deflects the queen from defence of b7, allowing 33.Qb7+ Kxa5 34.Ra1#.
