= Lačný =

Lačný (feminine: Lačná) is a Slovak surname. Notable people with this surname include:

- Ľudovít Lačný (born 1926), Slovak chess problem composer and judge
- Miloš Lačný (born 1988), Slovak footballer

== See also ==
- Lacny, a chess problem theme named after Ľudovít Lačný
- Lačna Gora, Slovenia
- Lačen, a Slovenian surname
