= Walter Grimshaw =

British chess composer

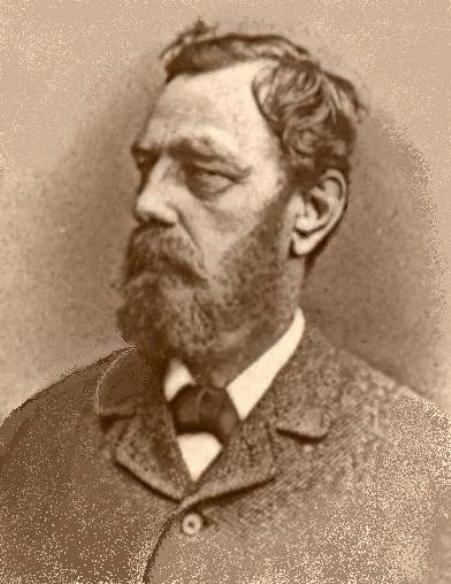
Grimshaw, c. 1880

Walter Grimshaw (12 March 1832 – 27 December 1890) was a 19th-century British composer of chess problems. In 1854 he won the first ever chess problem composition tourney in London. He is perhaps best known for giving his name to the Grimshaw, a popular problem theme.

== Sample compositions ==
Walter Grimshaw (1850)

Position: e8 black rook, g8 black rook, a6 white bishop, d6 white knight, b5 white pawn, d5 black king, g5 black knight, b4 white king, e4 black pawn, f4 white pawn, g4 black bishop, c3 white queen, f3 black pawn, h3 black knight, c2 white pawn

White to mate in 5

This is one of his problems, a mate in five (white moves first, and must checkmate black within five moves against any defence) first published in the Illustrated London News in 1850. The key is 1.Bc8 which threatens 2.Qc5# or Qd2#. To defend, black plays 1...Bxc8 white plays 2.Qf6 (threatening 3.c4#) and now a Grimshaw interference comes into play: black can defend by cutting off the white queen from the defence of d6 with 2...Ne6 or 2...Be6, but this interferes with the rook's guard of e5, and so allows 3.Qe5#. If instead black plays 2...Re6, this interferes with the bishop's guard of f5 which is significant after 3.Qd4+ Kxd4 4.Nf5+, because the knight cannot be captured. Instead, there follows 4...Kd5 5.c4#.

Walter Grimshaw (1852-1854)

Position: b7 black knight, g7 white king, a6 black queen, b6 black pawn, c6 white bishop, h6 black pawn, d5 white rook, h5 white pawn, e4 black king, f4 black pawn, h4 white knight, c3 black pawn, h3 white pawn, c2 white pawn, e2 black pawn, f2 white pawn, g1 white rook

White to mate in 3

The second example is one of Grimshaw's better-known problems, a mate in three composed for a competition organised by the Chess Players Chronicle, 1852-54. The key is the paradoxical 1.Rf1, sacrificing a strong white piece. This carries the threats 2.Nf3 (leading to various mates delivered by the d5 rook) and 2.f3+ (leading to knight mates on f5 or g2). Black's obvious defence, 1...exf1Q is answered by 2.Nf3 Kxf3 3.Rd2#. After 1...f3 (giving black a flight at f4), white plays his rook back to where it came from (a switchback) to take advantage of the newly opened fourth rank: 2.Rg1 any 3.Rg4#.

== Match Chess ==
A game by Grimshaw was already documented in 1853 in the British Chess Review. Grimshaw founded a chess club in Whitby, presumably around the year 1859, and remained its president until his death. He participated in several chess tournaments, mostly in Yorkshire, and seems to have been quite a good match player. It was even reported that around 1875, he won a private game in London against the later world champion Wilhelm Steinitz.
