= The Problemist =

Bimonthly chess problem magazine

The Problemist is a bimonthly chess problem magazine which has been in publication since January 1926. It originally had the subtitle "Proceedings of the British Chess Problem Society" but the words "Proceedings of" were dropped in January 1985.

== History and profile ==
The foreword to the first issue, written by the editor T. R. Dawson, begins: "This little journal, bringing Happy New Year Greetings to every member of the B. C. P. S., will be to most of you a surprise calling for explanation. Its origin lies in the desire to have a medium in which the Society, as a collection of units and as a unity, may give expression to its thoughts and life. Following a suggestion from Mr F. F. L. Alexander, at the last annual general meeting, I obtained quotations for printing this periodical which enabled me to formulate a practical scheme for its continuance within the limits of our income. The scheme was unanimously adopted at a special meeting on Nov. 27th last, with Mr B. G. Laws in the chair and I accepted the meeting's invitation to edit these pages. Our title is a happy suggestion from Mr C. D. Locock."

T. R. Dawson continued as editor of The Problemist until May 1931 when he resigned to devote more time to The Problemist Fairy Chess Supplement which he had begun in August 1930 (in 1936 it was renamed the Fairy Chess Review).

The post of editor of The Problemist was taken on by C. S. Kipping who held the position until his death in 1963. Subsequent editors have been John Ling, Colin Vaughan from March 1972, Paul Valois from May 1985, John Rice from March 1999, and David Friedgood from January 2013.

All these general editors have been assisted by a team of section editors devoted to specific topics. The Problemist continues to be devoted essentially to orthodox chess problems, including regular columns on endgames, selfmates and helpmates using the orthodox chess pieces. A fairy chess column was reintroduced by A. S. M. Dickins in March 1968.

In January 1997, as a result of modern computer production methods, the page-size of the magazine was reduced from the traditional quarto size to A5, though with more pages. Although the magazine is published by the British Chess Problem Society, membership of the Society is open to people throughout the world, and this is reflected in the names of the contributors of problem compositions and articles.

In 2006 the Problemist was named as the Magazine of the Year by English Chess Federation. John Rice was the editor-in-chief.
