= Albino (chess) =

Problem in the game of chess

Pawns

An Albino is a type of chess problem, "in which, at some point in the solution, a white Pawn on its starting square makes each of its four possible moves (forward one square, forward two squares, capture to the left, capture to the right)." When a Black pawn exhibits similar activity or a quadruple defense instead of "Albino" it is termed a "Pickaninny" (see: albino and pickaninny). The Albino is, "the four possible moves of a WP [white pawn] on its initial square (excluding squares a2 and h2)," and, the Pickaninny, "the four possible moves of a BP [black pawn] on its initial square (excluding squares a7 and h7)". The latter term was coined by Frank Janet by 1916.

== Examples ==
Camil Seneca,
Bulletin Ouvrier des Echecs, 1949

Position: b6 white queen, a4 black king, c4 black bishop, a3 white knight, f3 white rook, c2 white pawn, d1 white bishop, h1 white king

A simple example of an Albino is the problem to the right, a mate in 2 (White moves first and must checkmate Black in two moves against any defense). It is by Camil Seneca and was first published in the April 1949 edition of the Bulletin Ouvrier des Echecs. The first move of the solution (or key) is 1.Nb1. This threatens 2.Ra3#. Black has four ways to defend against this, each of which leads to a different move of the White pawn. After 1...Bb3, the only move that mates is 2.cxb3# (the pawn captures to the left). After 1..Bd3, the only mate is 2.cxd3# (capturing to the right). After 1...Bb5 only 2.c3# will do (forward one square; 2.c4 is no good because the b4 square needs to be covered by the pawn now the White queen has been cut off). After 1...Bd5 only 2.c4# will do (2.c3 is no good, because Black could play 2...Bb3).

Lev Loshinsky,
Moskau-Rostow, 1930

Position: a7 white king, e7 white rook, f7 black bishop, g7 black pawn, h7 white pawn, e6 black pawn, f6 white knight, h6 white rook, c5 white bishop, e5 black king, g4 white queen, h4 black pawn, c3 white knight, d3 black rook, f3 black knight, d2 black knight, e2 white pawn, b1 white bishop, d1 black rook

The Albino pawn moves need not necessarily be in the post-key play of the problem; they can instead be tries: moves which almost solve a problem but which fail to a single Black defense. The mate in 2 to the right, which combines the Albino with a Pickaninny, is an example. It is by Lev Loshinsky and was published in Moskau-Rostow in 1930. The key is 1.Nfd5 (threatening 2. Qf4#) with the variations 1...g5 2. h8=Q#; 1...Rxc3/Rxd5 2.Qf5#; and 1...Rd4 2.Qxg7/f5#. The main point of the problem however, is in the Albino tries, each of which is refuted by a Pickaninny defense. The relevant variations are:

- 1.exd3 (capture to the left; threatens 2.Nd7#) fails to 1...gxf6 (capture to the right)
- 1.exf3 (capture to the right; threatens 2.Qg5# and 2.f4#) fails to 1...gxh6 (capture to the left)
- 1.e3 (one square forward; threatens 2.Qf4#) fails to 1...g5 (two squares forward)
- 1.e4 (two squares forward; threatens 2. Qf5#) fails to 1...g6 (one square forward)

In each of these cases there are other ways for Black to counter White's threat, but the Pickaninny move is the only one that doesn't give White a new mate (for example, after 1.exf3, Bg6 prevents White's threats, but is not any good because it allows 2.Rxe6#).

Adrian Storisteanu,
British Chess Magazine, 1977

Position: c8 black queen, e8 black rook, f8 black knight, d6 white pawn, f5 black pawn, a4 black upside-down queen, b4 black pawn, h4 white king, a3 black rook, e3 black upside-down queen, b2 white rook, c2 white pawn, h2 black king, a1 black upside-down queen, b1 white upside-down queen, f1 black upside-down queen, h1 black upside-down queen

An albino chess problem with a fairy chess piece called a grasshopper.

The nature of the Albino theme is such that in orthodox chess there must be at least four variations to show the four different moves of the White pawn. However, if the rules of circe chess are applied, the number of required variations can be reduced to two (circe is a chess variant in which captured pieces, rather than being removed from the board, are returned to their home squares). The problem to the right is an example; it is by Adrian Storisteanu and was first published in the British Chess Magazine in 1977. The problem is a helpmate in 2, which means Black moves first and cooperates with White to move to a position where Black is in checkmate after White's second move. This problem features grasshoppers (represented here by inverted queens), a fairy chess piece which moves along the same lines as a queen, but which must "hop" over another piece (friendly or enemy) and land on the square immediately beyond.

There are two solutions to the problem (note that in helpmates, Black's moves are given first):

- 1.Rd3 c3+ 2.Gaxc3(pc2) cxd3(Ra8)#
- 1.Rb3 c4+ 2.Gxc4(pc2) cxb3(Ra8)#

The first solution has the White pawn moving forward one square, then, after its rebirth on c2, capturing to the right; the second solution has the pawn first moving two squares and then capturing to the left. Problems like this, showing an Albino with fewer than four variations, are very unusual.
