= Fairy Chess Review =

- Editor: C. E. Kemp (June 1956–April 1958)
- Former editors: Thomas Rayner Dawson (1930–August 1951); Dennison Nixon (April 1952–April 1956)
- Categories: Chess
- Frequency: Bi-monthly
- Founder: Thomas Rayner Dawson
- First issue: August 1930
- Final issue Number: April 1958; Vol 9
- Company: British Chess Problem Society
- Country: United Kingdom
- Based in: Thornton Heath, Surrey
- Language: English
- OCLC: 150381193

Fairy Chess Review (FCR) was a British magazine devoted principally to fairy chess problems, but also included extensive original results on related questions in mathematical recreations, such as knight's tours and polyominoes (under the title of "dissections"), and chess-related word puzzles. It appeared six times per year and nine volumes were published, from 1930 to 1958.

Although they are often referred to under the title Fairy Chess Review, the first two volumes (August 1930 to June 1936) in fact bore the title The Problemist Fairy Chess Supplement. These were published by the British Chess Problem Society (BCPS) as an offshoot of their magazine The Problemist which began in 1926. The first two volumes were supported financially by the Falmouth businessman Charles Masson Fox who was also a problemist, who died in 1936.

From volume 3 onwards the FCR was independent of the BCPS, although most of its contributors were members. The editor from 1930 until August 1951 was Thomas Rayner Dawson who died in November that year. An "In Memoriam" issue was edited by C. E. Kemp in February 1952, and the magazine then continued under the editorship of Dennison Nixon (April 1952 to April 1956) and C. E. Kemp (June 1956 to April 1958).

== See also ==
- The Problemist
