= Joseph Plachutta =

Austrian chess composer (1827–1883)

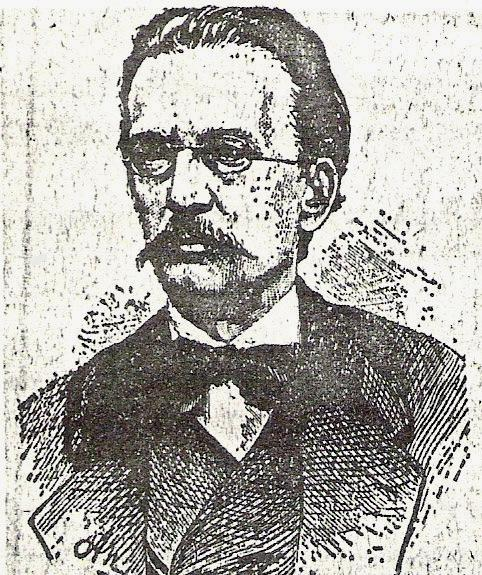
Joseph Plachutta

Joseph Plachutta (13 May 1827 in Zadar, Austrian Empire, today's Croatia – 22 July 1883), also called Josef Plachutta or Josip Plahuta, was a Slovene-descent chess problemist and chess player, known for his famous problem with the Plachutta theme.

Joseph Plachutta
Leipziger Illustrirte Zeitung, 1858

Position: d8 white bishop, g8 black rook, h7 black rook, a6 black knight, e6 black pawn, f6 black bishop, c5 white pawn, e5 black king, c4 white king, e4 white pawn, c3 black pawn, d3 white pawn, d1 white queen, g1 white rook

Mate in 4 moves

Solution:

1.Qf3! (threat 2.d4 mate)

1...Nxc5 2.Rg7! (this is the actual Plachutta. threats 3.Qg3 and 3.Bc7)

2...Rgxg7 3.Bc7+ Rxc7 4.Qg3#

2...Rhxg7 3. Qg3+ Rxg3 4.Bc7#
