= Antonín Novotný (chess composer) =

Czech chess composer and lawyer

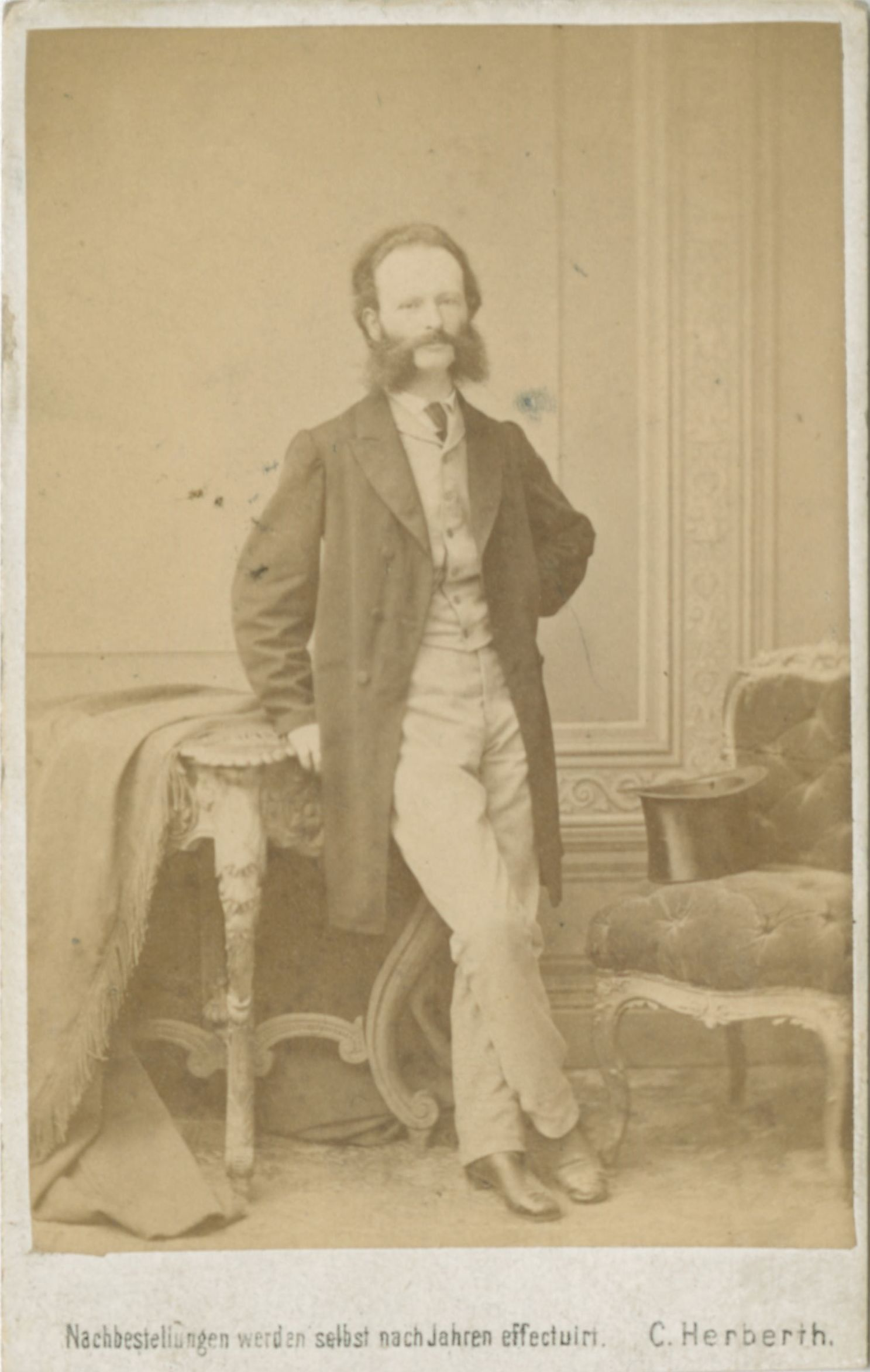
Antonín Novotný

Antonín Novotný (22 August 1827 in Dobromilice – 9 March 1871) was a Czech chess composer and lawyer in Brno. The Novotny theme is named after him – the first appearance of the theme was in a Novotný three-mover from 1854.

Antonin Nowotny
Leipziger Illustrirte Zeitung, 1854

Position: c8 black bishop, h8 black rook, c7 black knight, g7 black bishop, h6 white knight, b5 white rook, c4 white pawn, e4 black king, h4 white bishop, f3 white knight, g3 white pawn, b2 white pawn, e2 white king

Mate in 3

Solution:

1.Rf5! threatens 2.Rf4 mate. If 1... Bxf5 then 2.Nf7 threatens both mate with either 3.Nd6# and N7g5# which can't be stopped.

1...Rf8 2.Bf6! Blocks both f8-f4 and g7-e5 lines and threats 3.Rf4# and 3.Re5#

2...Rxf6 3.Re5#, 2...Bxf6 3.Rf4#, 2...Bxf5 3.Ng5# or 3.Nd2#
