= Seriesmover =

T. R. Dawson
Fairy Chess Review, 1947

Position: a5 white knight, f2 black pawn, a1 black king, c1 white king

Serieshelpmate in 17 moves.

A seriesmover is a chess problem in which one side makes a series of legal moves without reply at the end of which the other side makes a single move, giving checkmate or yielding stalemate, depending on the precise stipulation. Checks cannot be given except on the last move of the series. There are various types of seriesmover:

- Seriesmate: a directmate with White playing a series of moves without reply to checkmate Black (the seriesmover analogue to the directmate).
- Serieshelpmate: a helpmate in which Black plays a series of moves without reply after which White plays one move to checkmate Black (the seriesmover analogue to the helpmate).
- Seriesselfmate: a selfmate in which White plays a series of moves leading to a position in which Black is forced to give mate (the seriesmover analogue to the selfmate).
- Seriesreflexmate: a reflexmate in which White plays a series of moves leading to a position in which Black can, and therefore must, give mate. Further, White is obliged to mate whenever he can, therefore he has to avoid in his series of moves a position in which he would have mating possibility (the seriesmover analogue to the reflexmate).

Thus a serieshelpmate in n moves consists of n legal unique moves by Black (all but possibly the last non-checking moves) followed by one move by White that mates Black. To the right is a serieshelpmate in seventeen by T. R. Dawson (published in Fairy Chess Review, 1947). An effective way to solve long serieshelpmates such as this is to envisage a position in which Black could be checkmated, and then to work out how such a problem could be reached. Here, with just one knight, the only way to checkmate Black is to have the black king in the corner and another black piece on a2, allowing Nb3 giving mate. It might seem there are many ways to do this, but the need to avoid exposing the white king to check means that there is only one. The piece on a2 has to be a rook, since if it is a queen or bishop, it would cover the b3 square, and if it was a knight, it would check the king. The black king needs to walk half-way over the board to avoid the newborn rook giving check and then back to a1. (As usual, chess problems with unintended multiple solutions are considered flawed; they are often said to be cooked.) The solution here is:

1.Ka2 2.Ka3 3.Kb4 4.Kc3 5.Kd3 6.Ke2 7.Ke1 8.f1=R 9.Rf2 10.Ke2 11.Kd3 12.Kc3 13.Kb4 14.Ka3 15.Ka2 16.Ka1 17.Ra2 Nb3#
