= Grotesque (chess) =

Type of chess problem, often humorous

In chess, a grotesque is a problem or endgame study which features a particularly unlikely or impossible initial position, especially one in which White fights with a very small force against a much larger black army. Grotesques are generally intended to be humorous.

== Examples ==
=== Ottó Bláthy ===
Ottó Bláthy
The Chess Amateur, 1922

Position: c5 black pawn, b4 black pawn, c4 black pawn, a3 black bishop, b3 black rook, c3 black pawn, d3 black pawn, a2 black queen, b2 black pawn, c2 black pawn, d2 black rook, e2 black pawn, f2 white king, h2 white pawn, b1 black knight, c1 black king, d1 black bishop, e1 black knight

White to play and win

A particularly extreme example by Ottó Bláthy is illustrated in the adjacent diagram. In the initial position Black has all sixteen pieces remaining and White has just a single pawn on its starting square, yet it is White who will deliver checkmate.

This position in Forsyth-Edwards Notation (FEN) is: 8/8/8/2p5/1pp5/brpp4/qpprpK1P/1nkbn3 w - - 0 1

The solution is:

1.Kxe1 Qa1 2.h3!! Qa2 3.h4 Qa1 4.h5 Qa2 5.h6 Qa1 6.h7 Qa2 7.h8=N! Qa1 8.Nf7 Qa2 9.Nd8 Qa1 10.Ne6 Qa2 11.Nxc5 Qa1 12.Ne4 Qa2 13.Nd6 Qa1 14.Nxc4 Qa2 15.Na5 Qa1 16.Nxb3#

The fact that the black queen must be on a1 rather than a2 when White plays Nxb3 explains why 2.h4? does not work. Similarly, if the white knight takes a more direct route to the b3-square with 8.Ng6 Qa2 9.Ne5 Qa1 10.Nxc4? Qa2 11.Na5, Black can lose a move with 11...c4! 12.Nxc4 Qa1 13.Na5 Qa2 and there is no mate. By the same token, there are several alternatives to 8.Nf7 and 12.Ne4, as long as the knight arrives on time for 11.Nxc5 and 14.Nxc4 respectively. This kind of precise timing is quite a common feature in this type of problem.

=== Tigran Gorgiev ===
The composer most closely associated with the grotesque is probably Tigran Gorgiev; here is one of his examples.

This position in Forsyth-Edwards Notation (FEN) is : 8/8/4N3/4Q3/1pp5/1p3N2/bpqp1p2/nrkrbK2 w - - 0 1

Tigran Gorgiev
Third Prize, Schach Echo, 1969

Position: e6 white knight, e5 white queen, b4 black pawn, c4 black pawn, b3 black pawn, f3 white knight, a2 black bishop, b2 black pawn, c2 black queen, d2 black pawn, f2 black pawn, a1 black knight, b1 black rook, c1 black king, d1 black rook, e1 black bishop, f1 white king

White to play and draw

This time, White is to play and draw. This is achieved by sacrificing most of his already small force to compel Black to repeat moves:

1. Nf4 Qd3+

Otherwise 2.Ne2+ leads to mate.

2. Nxd3+ cxd3 3. Qc3+ bxc3 4. Ne5 Kc2 5. Nc4 Kc1 6. Ne5

and Black has nothing more than a draw by repetition. Note that only the squares c4 and e5 will do for the white knight; if, for example, 4.Nd4 then 4...Nc2 allows Black to free himself (this is not possible with the knight on e5 because of Nxd3#); and if, for example, 5.Nc6 then Black can free himself with 5...Rbc1 or 5...Rdc1 (not possible with the knight on c4 because of Na3# and Ne3# respectively).

== Moremover ==
Paul Lamford
Chess America, March 1981

Position: b5 black king, f5 black pawn, a4 black pawn, c4 black pawn, e4 black pawn, f4 white pawn, g4 black pawn, a3 white pawn, b3 black pawn, c3 white pawn, d3 black pawn, e3 white pawn, g3 white pawn, h3 black pawn, b2 white pawn, d2 white pawn, h2 white pawn, a1 white queen, b1 white knight, c1 white king, f1 white knight, g1 white rook, h1 white rook

White to play and win

Similar play to that found in grotesques such as these may also be found in very long moremovers (problems with the stipulation "White to play and checkmate Black in no more than n moves", where n is very high, sometimes over 100), known as longmovers, of which Ottó Bláthy was also a notable composer.

To the right is a kind of problem quite closely related to these kinds of grotesques: this time it is White who has a clear material advantage, but it is difficult to make anything of it because of the locked pawn chain.

This position in Forsyth-Edwards Notation (FEN) is : 8/8/8/1k3p2/p1p1pPp1/PpPpP1Pp/1P1P3P/QNK2NRR w - - 0 1

At first glance it seems there is nothing to be done—on moves like Rg2, White cannot make progress unless Black captures—but White does have one plan: to play Qa2 at an appropriate moment in order to threaten Qxb3. Doing this immediately does not work (Black simply promotes on a1 and it is Black who wins by ...Qa2–b3–c2 mate), but there is a way. With the knights locked in place and the king unable to leave the back rank except for f2, White must carefully shuffle the king and rooks around each other until the queen receives enough support for a sacrificial breakthrough:

1. Kd1 Kb6 2. Ke1 Kb5 3. Rg2 Kb6 4. Re2 Kb5 5. Kf2 Kb6 6. Re1 Kb5 7. Rg1 Kb6 8. Rg2 Kb5 9. Rc1 Kb6 10. Ke1 Kb5 11. Re2 Kb6 12. Kd1 Kb5 13. Re1 Kb6 14. Rc2 Kb5 15. Kc1 Kb6 16. Qa2!! bxa2 17. b4! a1=Q 18. Rb2 Kb5 19. Rd1 Qxb2+ (if 19...Ka6 then 20.b5+ Kb6 21.Re1 Ka7 22.b6+ Kb7 23.Rd1 Ka8 24.b7+ Kb8 25.Re1 Kc7 26.b8=Q+) 20. Kxb2 Kb6 21. Rc1 Kb5 22. Rc2 dxc2 (if 22...Kb6 then 23.Kc1 Kb5 24.Rb2 Kb6 25.Kd1 Ka6 26.b5+ Ka7 27.b6+ Kb7 28.Kc1 Ka8 29.b7+ Kb8 25.Kd1 Kc7 26.b8=Q+) 23. Kxc2 Kc6 24. d3 exd3+ 25. Kd1 Kd5 26. Nbd2 Kc6 27. Nxc4

and the connected passed b- and c-pawns will queen in short order.

== See also ==
- Joke chess problem
