= Reflexmate =

Type of chess problem

A reflexmate is a chess problem in which White, moving first, must force Black to deliver checkmate within a specified number of moves against their will – with the added condition that if either player can give checkmate, they must. If this condition applies only to Black, it is a semi-reflexmate. (Without this condition, the problem is just ordinary selfmate.)

== Example ==
Štefan Sovík
Second Place IV WCCT 1990

Position: c8 white rook, d8 black rook, e8 black king, c7 black pawn, e7 black knight, f6 white pawn, g6 black bishop, h6 black bishop, a5 white pawn, b5 black queen, e5 white pawn, f5 white queen, a4 white bishop, b4 black pawn, c4 white rook, d4 white bishop, e4 white knight, g4 white pawn, h4 white pawn, b3 black rook, c3 black pawn, d3 white king, e3 black pawn, e2 white pawn, a1 black knight, b1 white knight

Reflexmate in two moves

The problem illustrated is a fairly recent example, successful in the World Chess Composing Tournament despite only a single phase of play present. It is by Štefan Sovík and is a reflexmate in two moves.

The key is 1.Qh5! and White threatens 2.Nbxc3, after which Black is compelled by additional condition to mate by Rxc3#, with triple pin of Rc4, Bd4 and Ne4.

There are three thematical variations with unpinnings of three pieces, but every time Black has to mate by switchback after selfpin of unpinned piece on c3:

- 1...Qxa4 2.Rxc3 Qb5# (White move: rook unpinned by queen move selfpins)
- 1...Rxc8 2.Bxc3 Rd8# (White move: bishop unpinned by rook move selfpins)
- 1...Bxh5 2.Nexc3 Bg6# (White move: knight unpinned by bishop move selfpins)

Another three variations result in unpinnings of white pieces, but the mates are not by switchback:

- 1...Qd7 2.Rc6 Qxd4# (White move: unpinned rook unguards d4 and unpins queen)
- 1...Nd5 2.Bxe3 Nf4# (White move: unpinned bishop opens d-file and blocks e3)
- 1...Kd7 2.Bxc3 Kxc8# (White move: unpinned bishop opens d-file and selfpins on c3)

In the next three variations the black pieces are unpinned and mate:

- 1...Qc6 2.Bxb3 Qxe4# (White move: bishop unpins queen)
- 1...Nf5 2.Rxc7 Rxd4# (White move: rook unpins rook)
- 1...Bf7 2.Qf5 Bxc4# (White move: queen unpins bishop)

The last variation is just technical:

- 1...Rxb1 2.Bd1 Rxd1#

The example is putting emphasis on unpinning and pinning (see motivatioñs) and illustrates one of the artistic advantages of reflexmate over selfmate, namely the presence of more varied mates (on average).
