= Ľudovít Lačný =

Slovak chess problem composer and judge (1926-2019)

Ľudovít Lačný (December 8, 1926 – December 25, 2019) was a Slovak chess problem composer and judge.

Lačný was born in Banská Štiavnica and studied mathematics, working as a teacher, and as a computer programmer.

In 1956 Lačný was appointed an International Judge of Chess Compositions and in 2005 was awarded the International Master for Chess Composition title. He is best known as the eponym of the Lacny cycle, according to the theme invented by him in 1949.
