= Grid chess =

Chess variant where every move must cross a grid line

	a	b	c	d	e	f	g	h
8	a8	b8	c8	d8	e8	f8	g8	h8	8
7	a7	b7	c7	d7	e7	f7	g7	h7	7
6	a6	b6	c6	d6	e6	f6	g6	h6	6
5	a5	b5	c5	d5	e5	f5	g5	h5	5
4	a4	b4	c4	d4	e4	f4	g4	h4	4
3	a3	b3	c3	d3	e3	f3	g3	h3	3
2	a2	b2	c2	d2	e2	f2	g2	h2	2
1	a1	b1	c1	d1	e1	f1	g1	h1	1
	a	b	c	d	e	f	g	h

Grid chess sample position

Grid chess is a chess variant invented by Walter Stead in 1953. It is played on a grid board. This is a normal 64-square chessboard with a grid of lines further dividing it into larger squares. A single additional rule governs Grid chess: for a move to be legal, the piece moved must cross at least one grid line.

Grid chess is also used in chess problems.

== Description ==
Various arrangements of the grid have been tried, but the original, and by far the most popular, is that illustrated, which divides the board into sixteen 2×2 squares.

In the sample position, White can play either a3 or a4, but cannot move the b-pawn. Black cannot play ...Bd5 but can play any other bishop move – to put the bishop on d5, it will take two moves (for example, first ...Ba8, then ...Bd5). The white king is not in check from the queen, but would be, if the queen were to take a step back with ...Qe3. The white king cannot take the queen, although the white knight can. The black king, on the other hand, is in check from the rook on c8. Black cannot escape check as in standard chess with ...Ke7 or ...Kf7, as these moves do not cross a grid line. Black can play ...Kd7, however, and also ...Kd8, bringing the king into the same large square as the rook.

== Example problem ==
	a	b	c	d	e	f	g	h
8	a8	b8	c8	d8	e8	f8	g8	h8	8
7	a7	b7	c7	d7	e7	f7	g7	h7	7
6	a6	b6	c6	d6	e6	f6	g6	h6	6
5	a5	b5	c5	d5	e5	f5	g5	h5	5
4	a4	b4	c4	d4	e4	f4	g4	h4	4
3	a3	b3	c3	d3	e3	f3	g3	h3	3
2	a2	b2	c2	d2	e2	f2	g2	h2	2
1	a1	b1	c1	d1	e1	f1	g1	h1	1
	a	b	c	d	e	f	g	h

Helpmate in four

It is possible to play entire games under Grid chess conditions, and a number of chess problems using Grid chess rules have also been composed. The one shown won first prize in the first Grid chess problem tournament. It is by H. Ternblad and was published in Fairy Chess Review, 1954. It is a helpmate in four (Black moves first and cooperates with White to checkmate him within four moves). The solution:

1. Ke2 Bc4+ 2. Kd3

This brings the king into the same large square as the bishop, and so escapes the check.

2... Bxb5+

Withdrawing the bishop over a grid line gives check again.

3. Ke4 Bc6+ 4. Kd5

Two kings can coexist next to each other so long as they are in the same large square.

4... Bxb7#

This problem displays attractive correspondence between the paths taken by the king and bishop. There is a zigzagging path the black king must take to reach d5: the straightforward route Kd1–d2–d3–d4–d5 is not possible because two of the moves do not cross grid lines, and Kd1–e2–e3–d4–d5 is not possible because on d4 the king is checked by White's king.
