= Dobromilice =

- Municipality
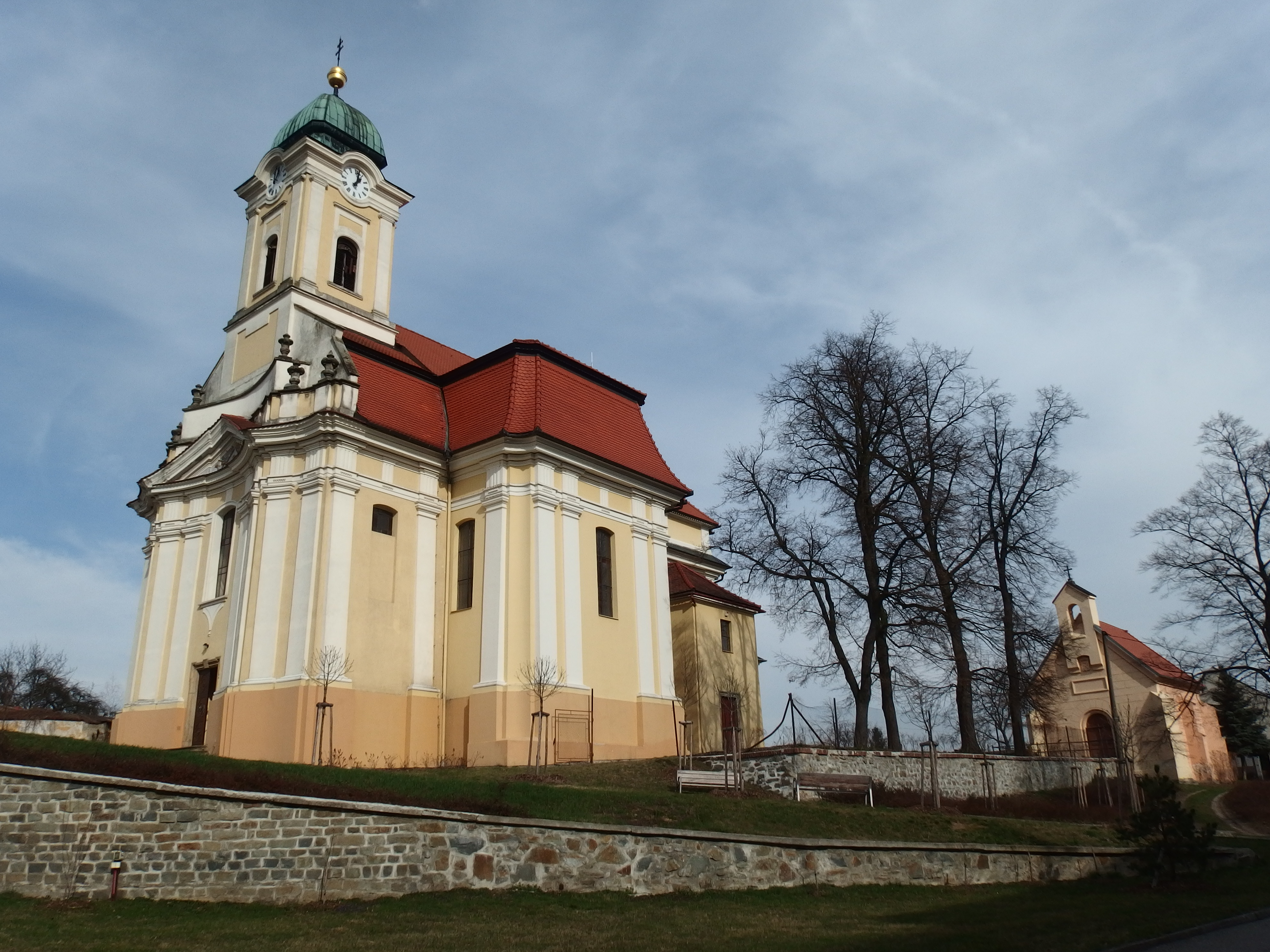
- Church of All Saints

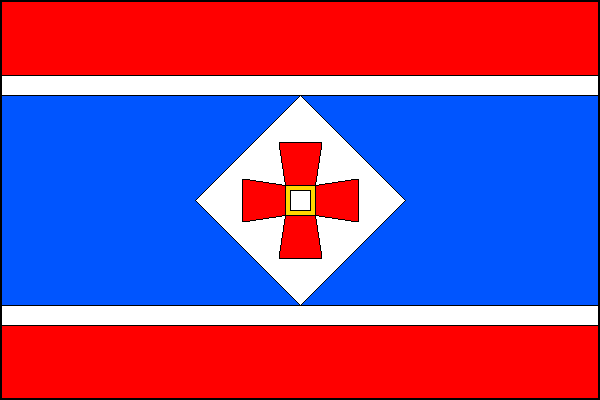
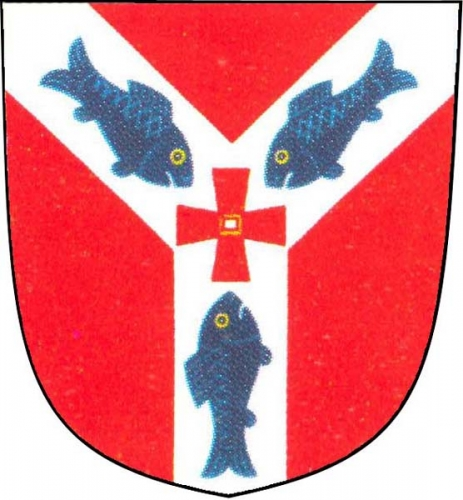
- Flag Coat of arms

- Location in the Czech Republic
- Coordinates: 49°21′30″N 17°8′30″E
- Country: Czech Republic
- Region: Olomouc
- District: Prostějov
- First mentioned: 1280

Area
  - Total: 7.95 km^{2} (3.07 sq mi)
- Elevation: 218 m (715 ft)

Population (2026-01-01)
  - Total: 783
  - Density: 98.5/km^{2} (255/sq mi)
- Time zone: UTC+1 (CET)
  - Summer (DST): UTC+2 (CEST)
- Postal code: 798 25
- Website: www.dobromilice.cz

Dobromilice (German: Dobromilitz) is a municipality and village in Prostějov District in the Olomouc Region of the Czech Republic. It has about 800 inhabitants.

Dobromilice lies approximately 13 kilometres (8 mi) south of Prostějov, 27 km (17 mi) south of Olomouc, and 212 km (132 mi) east of Prague.

== Demographics ==
Historical population
Year	Pop.	±%
1869	884	—
1880	938	+6.1%
1890	1,247	+32.9%
1900	1,238	−0.7%
1910	1,337	+8.0%
1921	1,177	−12.0%
1930	1,257	+6.8%
1950	1,026	−18.4%
1961	1,094	+6.6%
1970	993	−9.2%
1980	909	−8.5%
1991	792	−12.9%
2001	786	−0.8%
2011	789	+0.4%
2021	782	−0.9%
Source: Censuses

== Notable people ==
- Antonín Novotný (1827–1871), chess composer
- Karl Michael von Levetzow (1871–1945), German poet and librettist
