= Patrol chess =

Chess variant

Example of Patrol chess

Position: b7 white knight, f7 white knight, e5 black king, b4 black knight, c4 white pawn, c3 white king, e3 black rook, a2 black rook

1.Nbd8+? Ke4#

Patrol chess is a chess variant in which captures can be made and checks given only if the capturing or checking piece is guarded (or patrolled) by a friendly unit. Non-capturing and non-checking moves are played as normal.

The variant was invented by Frederik Hendrik von Meyenfeldt who published a chess problem using the rules in The Problemist (the magazine of the British Chess Problem Society) in 1975.

Patrol chess has often been used as a condition in chess problems. It is also possible to play complete games under Patrol chess rules.

== Example ==
The diagram position shows some of the peculiarities of Patrol chess. The white king cannot take the black knight because it is not guarded by a friendly piece. Similarly, the black rook is not giving check, and neither is the white knight on f7. If White were to play Nbd8, however, this would be check, as the knights would patrol one another. Black could reply ...Ke4, with checkmate: the king patrols the rook on e3 giving check and guarding b3 and d3; the rook on a2 is patrolled by the knight on b4 and so controls the squares b2, c2 and d2; Kd4 is not possible because the black king, patrolled by the e3 rook, controls that square; and Kxb4 is not possible because the white king is not patrolled and so cannot capture.

== See also ==
- Quantum, a 1975 abstract strategy board game
