= British Chess Problem Society =

- Abbreviation: BCPS
- Formation: August 10, 1918; 108 years ago
- Type: Chess problem society
- Headquarters: London, United Kingdom
- Region served: International / United Kingdom
- First President: B. G. Laws
- Publication: The Problemist
- Website: www.bcps.org.uk
- Remarks: Considered the oldest chess problem society in the world.

The British Chess Problem Society is considered the oldest chess problem society in the world.

The inaugural meeting of the British Chess Problem Society took place on 10 August 1918 at St George's Restaurant, 37 Martin's Lane London WC at 3pm. The meeting was chaired by the mathematical puzzle expert Henry Ernest Dudeney who was chairman of the Sussex Chess Problem Fraternity (SCPF). Officers elected were: President B. G. Laws, Treasurer H. D'O. Bernard, Auditor P. H. Williams, Secretary H. W. Butler.

The first meeting of the new Society was on 2 November 1918, at the same venue, when its constitution was approved. The BCPS Minute Book gives a full list of the 18 vice-presidents and 63 members who had been enrolled, plus 34 SCPF members. The British Chess Magazine for December 1918 reported the membership as being 126.

A short-lived British Chess Problem Journal was started by H. W. Butler in April 1919, but he had to resign due to ill health and G. W. Chandler took over as Secretary. The doings of the BCPS were then mainly published in G. W. Chandler's chess column in the Hampshire Telegraph and Post until the founding of The Problemist in 1926. The Problemist was published with the subtitle "Proceedings of the British Chess Problem Society" until it was dropped in 1985.

== See also ==
- Fairy chess
