= Novotny (chess) =

Chess term

The Novotny (also often spelled as Nowotny, even in non-German sources) is a device found in chess problems named after a problem from 1854 by Antonín Novotný, though the first example was composed by Henry Turton in 1851. A piece is sacrificed on a square where it could be taken by two different opposing pieces (almost invariably a rook and bishop), but whichever makes the capture, it interferes with the other. It is essentially a Grimshaw brought about by a sacrifice on the critical square.

This pattern can arise as part of a combination in an actual game, but it is extremely rare (see games below). Most chess players would not use the term "Novotny" to describe such a move, since that term is almost exclusively used in the context of chess problems.

== Examples ==
=== Basic ===
Position: b6 white queen, d6 white bishop, e5 black pawn, f5 black pawn, a4 white knight, f4 black king, h4 white king, d3 white pawn, a2 black rook, g2 white pawn, a1 black bishop

White to play and mate in two

The device can be understood by reference to the problem shown here, a mate in two moves (White moves first, and must checkmate Black in two moves against any defence). The key (first move of the solution) is 1.Nb2. This interferes with Black's rook and bishop, and whichever of those pieces takes the knight, it will interfere with the other—this is the Novotny idea at its most basic. So, if Black plays 1...Bxb2, this interferes with his rook and allows 2.Qf2#, while if he plays 1...Rxb2, it is the bishop that is interfered with, allowing 2.Qd4#.

Problemists would generally agree that a single Novotny with no other play, as in this example, makes for a relatively uninteresting problem. Usually, Novotnys are combined in problems with other ideas, or several Novotnys are shown in a single problem.

=== Multiple Novotnys ===
R. C. O. Matthews
British Chess Magazine, 1957

Position: a8 black bishop, b8 black rook, a7 black bishop, a6 white rook, d6 white knight, b5 white rook, h5 black rook, c4 white pawn, d4 black pawn, g4 black pawn, b3 white pawn, c3 black king, d3 white pawn, f3 white queen, g3 black pawn, a2 white bishop, c2 white knight, e2 white pawn, g2 black pawn, b1 black knight, c1 white king, g1 white bishop, h1 black knight

White to play and mate in three

The problem as shown here is very well known. It contains no fewer than six separate Novotnys. It is by R. C. O. Matthews, was published in the British Chess Magazine in 1957 and won the Brian Harley Award. It is a mate in three.

The key is 1.b4, threatening 2.Bxb1 and 3.Ra3#. Black has six thematic defences, each of which White meets with a Novotny on move two:

- 1...Bb6 threatens 2...Ba5, interfering with the path of the white rook to a3. White counters with a Novotny interference: 2.Rd5. This interferes with the black rook on h5 and the bishop on a8, and so threatens 3.Nb5# and 3.Ne4#. Black can prevent one by capturing on d5, but not both, because the capturing piece interferes with the other (so 2...Rxd5 3.Ne4#; or 2...Bxd5 3.Nb5#).
- 1...Rbxb5 threatens 2...Ra5 stopping the threat. White can now play 2.Qd5 with the same interferences and threats as follow 1...Bb6.
- 1...Bc5 threatens 2...Bxb4 to defend a3, stopping White's threat. White counters with 2.Rb7, interfering with the bishop on a8 and the rook on b8 and leading to the same threats and comparable continuations as follow 1...Bb6 (additionally, 2...Bxd6 allows 3.Bxd4#).
- 1...Bb7 threatens to capture the white rook which would give mate. White can now play 2.Rc5 interfering with the bishop on a7 and the rook on h5, and so threatening 3.Nb5# and 3.Bxd4#. As before, a capture on c5 stops one of the threats, but not both.
- 1...Bd5 threatens 2...Bxc4, after which Black could meet White's threatened 3.Ra3 with 3...Bb3. White instead plays 2.Rbb6 with the same threats and variations as follow 1...Bb7.
- 1...Rhxb5 threatens 2...Ra5, stopping the threat. White instead plays 2.Rb6 with the same threats and variations as follow 1...Bb7.

The solution, in short form, is thus:

1.b4

- 1...Bb6 2.Rd5
- 1...Rbxb5 2.Qd5
- 1...Bc5 2.Rb7
- 1...Bb7 2.Rc5
- 1...Bd5 2.Rbb6
- 1...Rhxb5 2.Rb6

Four of White's Novotnys in these variations are executed by the rook on b5—only the rook will do in those variations, because the square it comes from, b5, must be vacated for the white knight to deliver mate. In the other two lines, that rook is captured, meaning it cannot execute the Novotny, but also meaning the square vacation is no longer necessary (the white knight can simply capture the black piece on b5). Therefore, another piece can make the Novotny interference in those lines. (There is one other non-thematic defence in the problem: 1...Nd2, threatening a nuisance check on b3. This allows 2.Ra3+ Nb3+ 3.Rxb3#.)

=== As part of a larger scheme ===
Milan Vukcevich, Schach-Echo, 1976

Position: a8 black bishop, b8 black bishop, g8 black queen, a7 white bishop, d7 black rook, e6 black pawn, g5 black knight, c4 white knight, g4 white rook, h4 black pawn, a3 black pawn, f3 black king, a2 white king, d2 black pawn, g2 white rook, h2 white queen

White to play and mate in two

Many problems include a Novotny as part of some larger scheme. The problem here, by Milan Vukcevich, published in Schach-Echo in 1976, includes a Novotny as just one part of a more complex problem. It is a mate in two. The key is 1.Qd6, which is a Novotny interference with the black rook and bishop on b8, so threatening 2.Ne5# and 2.Nxd2#. After the capture of the queen by the rook or bishop, the other black piece is still interfered with by the capturing unit; so 1...Rxd6 rules out 2.Nxd2 but still allows 2.Ne5#, while 1...Bxd6 rules out 2.Ne5 but allows 2.Nxd2#. Just as these Novotny lines work as a pair, so the other Black defences work in pairs:

1...Rxa7 (removes white guard of e3) 2.Qd3#
1...Bxa7 (removes white guard of e3) 2.Qf4#
1...e5 (pins the knight that gives the mate in the Novotny lines) 2.Qf6#
1...Bd5 (pins the knight) 2.Qxa3# (not otherwise possible because of 2...Rd3)

=== The Novotny theme in practical play ===
Macdonald vs. Burn, 1910

Position: c8 black queen, a7 black pawn, b7 black pawn, c7 black rook, g7 black king, d6 black pawn, a5 white pawn, c5 black pawn, d5 white pawn, e5 black pawn, g5 black bishop, h5 white bishop, c4 white pawn, h4 black knight, b3 white pawn, h3 white pawn, d2 white queen, f2 white pawn, h2 white king, g1 white rook

Position after White's 33rd move

The Novotny theme occurs extremely rarely in actual play. The strong English master Amos Burn produced such an example in an offhand game in Liverpool in 1910 (see diagram). In a seemingly desperate position, with his king apparently about to fall to a powerful attack by White's pieces, Burn played 33...Qg4!! The point is that if the bishop or pawn takes the queen, the white rook's pin on the black bishop is lifted, allowing 34...Bxd2; if the rook takes the queen, the white bishop no longer protects f3, so Black can play the royal fork 34...Nf3+ and 35...Nxd2. Finally, if 34.Qxg5+, Qxg5 35.Rxg5+ Kh6 (a king fork) wins a piece. Burn won in 15 more moves and was to comment afterwards that his 33...Qg4 demonstrated that there is an element of luck in chess.

Rubtsova vs. Belova, 1945

Position: a8 black rook, e8 black rook, g8 black king, c7 black pawn, b6 black pawn, c6 white knight, g6 black bishop, a5 black pawn, b5 white queen, f5 black pawn, g5 black queen, c4 white pawn, d4 white pawn, e4 black pawn, g4 white rook, a3 white pawn, c3 white pawn, e3 white pawn, g3 black knight, g2 white pawn, d1 white bishop, e1 white rook, g1 white king

Position after 1.Rf4–g4?

In this position, from Rubtsova–Belova, USSR 1945, White has just played the attractive-looking 1.Rf4–g4? Black cannot capture the rook (1...Qxg4? 2.Bxg4; 1...fxg4?? 2.Qxg5), and White would win a piece after 1...Qf6? 2.Rxg3. However, Black responded with a decisive Novotny, 1...Ne2+! This enables Black to win the rook after 2.Rxe2 Qxg4; 2.Bxe2 Qxe3+ and 3...fxg4; or 2.Kf1 Qxg4. Black won.

Berg vs. Zezulkin, 2000

Position: h8 black king, h7 black pawn, a6 black pawn, d6 black pawn, h6 white queen, e5 black bishop, f5 black rook, e4 black pawn, f4 black queen, g4 white knight, g3 white rook, f2 white pawn, h2 white pawn, h1 white king

Position after Black's 39th move

The Novotny theme could also have occurred in actual play in E. Berg–J. Zezulkin, Rowy 2000. From this diagram, White could have won with 40.Nf6!! (instead of 40.Qe6?, leading to an eventual draw). After 40.Nf6!!, White would threaten the two thematical mates 41.Qg7# and 41.Qf8# and in addition 41.Rg8# and 41.Qxh7#. Now 40...Bxf6 would block Black's rook, allowing 41.Qf8#, while 40...Rxf6 would block Black's bishop, allowing 41.Qg7#. After 40...Qxh6 which parries both thematical threats White has 41.Rg8#.

Navara vs. Dergatschova-Daus, 2007

Position: e8 black queen, b7 black bishop, e7 white pawn, f7 black king, h7 black pawn, a6 black rook, g6 black pawn, e5 white queen, h5 black knight, b4 white pawn, d4 white bishop, f3 white pawn, b2 white pawn, g2 white pawn, h2 white pawn, c1 white rook, e1 white rook, h1 white king

Position after Black's 35th move

The Novotny theme was played in David Navara–Anna Dergatschova-Daus, Ordix Open, Mainz 2007. If White could check on the a2–g8 diagonal, it would force mate quickly. But the black rook guards e6, and the black bishop guards d5. So 36.Rc6!! intersects both lines: 36...Rxc6 37.Qd5+ Re6 38.Qxe6#, or 36...Bxc6 37.Qe6#; and if 36...Qxc6 then 37.e8=Q+ Qxe8 38.Qxe8#.
