= Grimshaw (chess) =

A. G. Corrias,
Good Companion, 1917

Position: a7 white bishop, d7 white king, h7 white queen, f6 black pawn, d5 black king, c4 black pawn, f4 white pawn, a3 black pawn, h3 black pawn, a2 black rook, a1 black bishop

White to play and mate in two

A Grimshaw is a device found in chess problems in which two pieces (usually a rook and bishop) arriving on a particular square mutually interfere with each other. It is named after the 19th-century problem composer Walter Grimshaw. The Grimshaw is one of the most common devices found in directmates.

== Examples with description ==
The theme can be understood by reference to the displayed example by A. G. Corrias (published in Good Companion, 1917).

=== A. G. Corrias example ===
The problem is a mate in two (White must move first and checkmate Black in two moves against any defence). The key is 1.Qb1, which threatens 2.Qb7#. Black has three ways to defend against this.

- One is to play 1...c3, giving his king a new flight square at c4, but this unguards d3, allowing White to mate with 2.Qd3#.

It is the other two Black defences, however, which show the Grimshaw theme.

- Black can play 1...Bb2, thus cutting off the white queen's path to b7. However, the bishop on b2 interferes with the a2-rook and stops it moving along the rank – this allows White to play 2.Qh1# (after a different Black move, this would not be possible because of 2...Rg2, blocking the check).
- Black can instead play 1...Rb2, cutting off the white queen with the rook rather than the bishop. However, just as the bishop on b2 interferes with the rook, so the rook on b2 interferes with the bishop, allowing White to play 2.Qf5# (a mate not otherwise possible, because of 2...Be5, blocking the check).

It is this mutual interference between two black pieces on the one square (in this case, a rook and a bishop on b2) that constitutes a Grimshaw.

=== Second example ===
Valky River

Position: a8 black bishop, b8 white knight, e8 white rook, g8 white king, h8 white bishop, a7 black rook, e7 black pawn, f7 white knight, a6 black rook, e6 black king, h6 black pawn, a5 black bishop, e5 white pawn, c4 white pawn, d4 white queen, e4 black pawn, f4 black pawn, g4 white pawn, b1 white bishop

White to play and mate in two

The key in the puzzle on the right is 1.Qd2. This move has no threat, but it leaves Black in zugzwang: Black must either move one of his bishops or rooks, or move a pawn. However, any bishop or rook move must unguard one of the squares of d5, d6, d7 or d8, allowing White to mate on d5, d6 or d7 with the queen, and d8 with the knight. The lines are:

1.Qd2!
- 1...Bxd2 2.Nd8#
- 1...Rb7 2.Qd5# (2...Bxd5 not possible)
- 1...Rc6 2.Qd5# (2...Bxd5 not possible)
- 1...Bb6 2.Qd6# (2...Rxd6 not possible; 2...exd6 not possible due to pin)
- 1...Bc6 2.Qd6# (2...Rxd6 not possible; 2...exd6 not possible due to pin)
- 1...Bb7 2.Qd7# (2...Rxd7 not possible)
- 1...Bc7 2.Qd7# (2...Rxd7 not possible)
- 1...Rb6 2.Nd8# (2...Bxd8 not possible)
- 1...Rc7 2.Nd8# (2...Bxd8 not possible)
- 1...e3 2.Bf5#
- 1...f3 2.Qxh6#
- 1...h5 2.Ng5#

== Grimshaws involving pawns ==
The pieces involved in Grimshaws are usually rook and bishop, as in the previous example, although Grimshaws involving pawns are also seen, as in this mate in two example by Frank Janet (published in the St.Louis Globe Democrat, 1916):

Frank Janet,
St.Louis Globe Democrat, 1916

Position: g8 black bishop, c7 black knight, e7 black pawn, h7 black pawn, a4 black rook, f4 black king, g4 white knight, h4 white king, e3 white knight, f3 black pawn, c2 white bishop, f2 white pawn, d1 white queen, f1 black knight

White to play and mate in two

The key is 1.Qd7, threatening 2.Qf5#. As in the previous example, Black can defend by cutting White's queen off from its intended destination square, but two of these defences have fatal flaws in that they interfere with other pieces: 1...Be6 interferes with the pawn on e7, allowing 2.Qxc7# (2...e5 would be possible were the bishop not on e6) and 1...e6 interferes with the bishop, allowing 2.Qxa4# (2...Bc4 would be possible were the pawn not on e6). It is this mutual interference between bishop and pawn on e6 which constitutes the pawn Grimshaw. There are several other non-thematic Black defences in this problem — see below for them all.

1.Qd7 (threatening 2.Qf5#)
- 1...Be6 2.Qxc7#
- 1...e6 2.Qxa4#
- 1...Ne6 2.Nd5#
- 1...Ra5 2.Qd4#
- 1...Nxe3 2.fxe3#
- 1...Ng3 2.fxg3#

== Multiple Grimshaws ==
Sometimes, multiple Grimshaws can be combined in one problem. Here are two examples by Lev Ilych Loshinsky each with three Grimshaws.

=== First example ===
Lev Ilych Loshinsky,
L'Italia Scacchistica, 1930

Position: f8 white knight, c7 white king, f7 white bishop, a6 white pawn, c6 black pawn, g6 black rook, b5 black pawn, c5 black king, b4 white knight, h4 white rook, c3 black pawn, d3 white pawn, h3 black bishop, a2 black rook, c2 white queen, h2 white bishop, a1 black bishop, f1 white rook

White to play and mate in two

This was first published in L'Italia Scacchistica, 1930. It is a mate in two. The key is 1.Rb1, with the threat 2.d4#. Each of Black's defences produces a Grimshaw interference which stops him from capturing White's mating piece. Black's defences, with White's replies, are:

- 1...Re6 2.Nd7# (2...Bxd7 not possible)
- 1...Be6 2.Bd6# (2...Rxd6 not possible)
- 1...Rg4 2.Ne6# (2...Bxe6 not possible)
- 1...Bg4 2.Bg1# (2...Rxg1 not possible)
- 1...Rb2 2.Qxc3# (2...Bxc3 not possible)
- 1...Bb2 2.Qf2# (2...Rxf2 not possible)

There is one other Black defence: 1...Rd6 leading to the simple recapture 2.Bxd6# (this is essentially the same mate as that which follows 1...Be6).

=== Second example ===
Lev Ilych Loshinsky,
Tijdschrift v.d. Nederlandse Schaakbond, 1930

Position: a8 black bishop, e8 white king, h8 black bishop, a7 black rook, c7 white rook, f7 black pawn, h7 black rook, e6 black king, b5 white knight, d5 black knight, c4 white bishop, d4 white pawn, f4 white queen

White to play and mate in two

This second Loshinsky example, also a mate in two, is from Tijdschrift v.d. Nederlandse Schaakbond, 1930, and is one of the most famous of all chess problems. It is a complete block (if White could pass his first move, then he could reply to every Black move with a mate), and White's key, 1.Bb3, holds this block, making no threat, but putting Black in zugzwang. Black has six defences leading to three Grimshaws, one of them a pawn Grimshaw:

- 1...Rb7 2.Rc6# (2...Bxc6 not possible)
- 1...Bb7 2.Re7# (2...Rxe7 not possible)
- 1...Rg7 2.Qe5# (2...Bxe5 not possible)
- 1...Bg7 2.Qxf7# (2...Rxf7 not possible)
- 1...Bf6 2.Qg4# (2...f5 not possible)
- 1...f6 2.Qe4# (2...Be5 not possible)

After other Black moves, White can play one of the above moves to mate; the three exceptions are 1...f5, taking away that square from the king and allowed 2.Qd6# and two recaptures: 1...Rxc7 2.Nxc7# and 1...Bxd4 2.Nxd4#.

== Novotny ==
A close relative of the Grimshaw is the Novotny, which is essentially a Grimshaw brought about by a White sacrifice on a square where it can be captured by two different black pieces – whichever black piece captures the white piece, it interferes with the other.
