= Lacny =

The Lacny or Lacny cycle is a chess problem theme named after Ľudovít Lačný [ˈlatʂ.ni], the first person to demonstrate the idea in 1949.

It is an example of lines of play being cyclically related: in one phase of play, the Black defences a, b and c are answered by the White mates A, B and C respectively; in another phase, those same defences a, b and c are answered by the White mates B, C and A respectively.

Ľudovít Lačný, 1949

Position: d7 black pawn, e7 white king, a6 black bishop, d6 black pawn, d5 white queen, h5 white bishop, a4 black queen, b4 white rook, c4 black pawn, f4 white knight, g4 black knight, a3 black rook, e3 black king, f3 white knight, g3 white bishop, a2 black rook, b2 white rook, c2 black pawn, a1 black knight, g1 black bishop

White to play and mate in two

The theme can be understood by reference to the problem to the right: this is the first problem to demonstrate the idea, by Lacny himself (first prize at the Przepiorka Memorial, 1949); it has been much-reproduced. The set play is:

1...Nh2 [a] 2.Qd4# [A]
1...c1=Q [b] 2.Ng2# [B]
1...c3 [c] 2.Qe4# [C]

The key to the solution is 1.Nd2 (threatening 2.Nf1#), after which the mates are changed thus:

1...Nh2 [a] 2.Ng2# [B]
1...c1=Q [b] 2.Qe4# [C]
1...c3 [c] 2.Qd4# [A]

As well as in set play (as in this example) the theme can be shown in tries, more than one solution or twins.

The scheme can be expanded to include more defences; in a fivefold Lacny, for example, the defences a, b, c, d and e are met with the mates A, B, C, D and E respectively in one phase and B, C, D, E and A respectively in another. The cycle can also be extended over three phases to make a complete Lacny cycle; here, the defences a, b and c are answered by the mates A, B and C respectively in one phase; by B, C and A respectively in another; and by C, A and B respectively in a third. This is considerably harder to achieve than the "simple" Lacny, and there are relatively few examples.

In the related threat Lacny, short-cut Lacny or Dombro-Lacny, in one phase A is threatened, and defence b leads to mate B while defence c leads to mate C; in another phase B is threatened and defence b leads to mate C while defence c leads to mate A. Once, problems following this scheme were also called Lacnys, but now a distinction tends to be drawn between the two (Peter Gvozdjak in Cyclone suggests this scheme should be called the Shedey cycle after its originator, Sergei Shedey). There are a number of other themes featuring cyclic play in different phases, including the Kiss and Djurasevic cycles.
