= Selfmate =

Type of chess problem

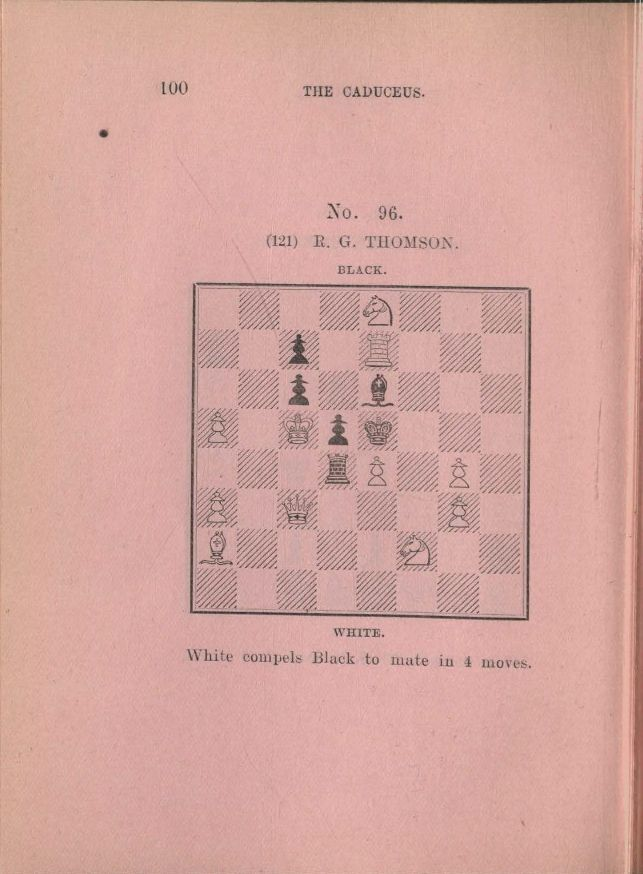
Example of selfmate

A selfmate is a chess problem in which White, moving first, must force Black to deliver checkmate within a specified number of moves. Selfmates were once known as sui-mates.

== Example ==
The problem shown is a relatively simple example. It is a selfmate in two by Wolfgang Pauly from The Theory of Pawn Promotion, 1912: White moves first and compels Black to deliver checkmate on or before Black's second move.

Wolfgang Pauly, 1912

Position: a8 white king, b8 white bishop, f8 white knight, a7 white pawn, c7 white pawn, e7 black pawn, g7 white pawn, f6 white pawn, h6 black king, e5 white pawn, h5 black pawn, h4 white pawn, g2 white bishop, h1 black bishop

White to play, selfmate in two

If White can leave Black with no option but to play Bxg2#, the problem is solved.

- White might try moving the bishop, but this is no good, as 1.Bxh1? ruins the selfmate, while any other bishop move allows 1...Bg2, allowing Black to later move his bishop off the a8–h1 diagonal;
- Moving the knight allows 1...Kg6, after which Black can stop selfmate by only moving the king;
- 1.e6? allows 1...exf6 and later 2...f5, freeing the king;
- 1.f7? or 1.fxe7? allows 1...Kxg7 and the king escapes;
- 1.g8=Q? or 1.g8=R? are no good, since after 1...exf6 2.exf6 Bxg2+, the newly promoted piece is forced to capture with 3.Q/Rxg2;
- 1.g8=B? also fails, since after 1...exf6 2.exf6 Bxg2+ the newly-promoted bishop is forced to interpose with 3.Bd5 allowing Black's bishop to escape;
- 1.g8=N#?? checkmates Black, which is entirely wrong.

The only move by which White can force Black to deliver checkmate on or before move two is:

1.c8=N!

Now, Black only has two legal responses besides Bxg2#, from which White can subsequently force the selfmate:

- If Black responds 1...exf6, recapturing with 2.exf6 forces 2...Bxg2# and selfmate;
- If Black responds 1...e6, White can then play 2.g8=B (the e6-pawn blocks 3.Bd5), forcing 2...Bxg2# and selfmate.

Note that a promotion to only a knight works on move one: any other piece would be able to interpose after 1...Bxg2+.

== Record problems ==
Karlheinz Bachmann, 2006
(version by Christopher Jeremy Morse)

Position: g8 white king, b7 black knight, c6 black pawn, a5 black pawn, c5 white pawn, g5 black knight, a4 white bishop, e4 white queen, g4 black pawn, h4 white pawn, a3 black pawn, f3 white pawn, h3 black pawn, a2 black pawn, b2 black bishop, g2 black pawn, h2 black rook, a1 black rook, c1 black king, h1 black bishop

White to play, selfmate in 203

The current record for the longest selfmate problem is a selfmate in 203, composed by Karlheinz Bachmann and Christopher Jeremy Morse in 2006. The puzzle is based on a 1922 342-move composition by Ottó Titusz Bláthy, which was later found to be cooked.

Prior to December 2021, the record for the longest selfmate problem was a 359-move problem, created by Andriy Stetsenko in 2016. Unfortunately, this problem was later found to be cooked, as a shorter solution exists.

== Variations ==
A derivative of the selfmate is the reflexmate, in which White compels Black to give mate with the added condition that if either player can give mate, they must (when this condition applies only to Black, it is a semi-reflexmate). There is also the maximummer, in which Black must always make the geometrically longest move available, as measured from square-centre to square-centre; although this condition is sometimes found in other types of problems, it is most common in selfmates. Another variation is the series-selfmate, a type of seriesmover in which White makes a series of moves without reply, at the end of which Black makes one move and is compelled to give mate.

== See also ==
- Helpmate
- Zugzwang, forcing a move (compulsion to move)
- Losing chess
