= Helpmate =

Type of chess problem

Zdravko Maslar, 1981

Position: a6 white knight, g3 black queen, d2 white king, g2 black king, d1 black bishop

Helpmate in 8

A helpmate is a type of chess problem in which both sides cooperate in order to achieve the goal of checkmating Black. In a helpmate in n moves, Black moves first, then White, each side moving n times, to culminate in White's nth move checkmating Black. (In a helpmate in 2 for example, sometimes abbreviated h#2, the solution consists of a Black move, a White move, a second Black move, then a second White move, giving checkmate.) Although the two sides cooperate, all moves must be legal according to the rules of chess.

The example problem illustrated is a helpmate in 8 (or h#8) by Zdravko Maslar, published in Die Schwalbe in 1981. The solution is (recall that in helpmate solutions, Black's move is given first):

1. Kf3 Kd3 2. Bb3 Kc3 3. Ke4+ Kd2 4. Kd4 Ke2 5. Kc3 Nb4 6. Kb2 Kd2 7. Ka1 Kc1 8. Ba2 Nc2#

== History ==
The first helpmate problem was by the German chess master Max Lange, published in Deutsche Schachzeitung, December 1854. The problem had White to move and White could play in a number of different ways to achieve the same mate (duals), considered a serious flaw today.

In The Chess Monthly, November 1860, American puzzle inventor Sam Loyd published the first helpmate with Black to move as is now standard, one intended main line, and an attractive but false solution (a try) to mislead solvers. However, this problem too had a minor dual, and also had the major flaw (or cook) of having a second, completely separate solution, not noted by the author. Even so, it was a much better problem than Lange's and its presentation, incorporating a story written by D. W. Fiske, established the genre.

The first completely sound helpmate was by A. Barbe of Leipzig, published in 105 Leipziger Ill. Familien-Journal, 1861.

The term "help-mate" originated in The Problem Art by T. B. and F. F. Rowland (Kingstown, 1897). The helpmate problem task has since increased in popularity to be second only to the directmate and is no longer considered to be part of fairy chess.

== Varieties of helpmate problems ==
=== Multiple solutions ===
Chris Feather, 1975

Position: b8 white rook, c8 black rook, d8 white bishop, g8 black bishop, e6 black knight, c5 black knight, g5 black pawn, c4 white king, f4 black bishop, b3 black pawn, d3 black rook, e3 black king, g2 white bishop, h2 white rook

Helpmate in 2 (two solutions)

Because the nature of helpmates sees Black and White cooperating, the play in helpmates may seem to be a great deal simpler than in directmates (the most common type of problem, where White tries to checkmate Black, and Black tries to avoid being mated). In directmates, a great variety of play can be found in the solution because although White has only one move at each juncture which will solve the problem, Black can choose between several to try to thwart White's efforts. In helpmates, however, both White's and Black's moves are limited to just one at each juncture; this may seem simple, but a well-constructed helpmate also shows thematic play, and the cooperating moves should not always be easy to find. It has been noted by Jean Oudot that "helpmates are the purest form of all the chess arts".

In order to introduce more lines of play into a problem, various devices can be employed. Most straightforwardly, a problem can have more than one solution. The solutions will usually complement each other in some thematic and aesthetically pleasing way. Each solution can be considered a different phase of play. If there is more than one solution, the composer will state this; if there is no such statement, the problem has only one solution. The example to the right is a helpmate in 2 (h#2) with two solutions. It was published in the June 1975 issue of Schach and is by the helpmate specialist Chris J. Feather.

The two solutions are 1. Bxb8 Bd5 2. Nc7 Bxg5# and 1. Rdxd8 Bc6 2. Nd7 Rxb3#. These lines are very closely linked, with both exhibiting the same basic pattern: first, Black takes the white piece that gives mate in the other solution (this is known as a Zilahi), at the same time opening the line on which mate is eventually given, then White moves a bishop to close a line so that Black's next move will not give check. Black's second move closes another line so that after White's last move, giving check, Black will not be able to interpose one of his pieces.

=== Twinning ===
Henry Forsberg, 1935

Position: a6 black queen, b4 white rook, g4 white king, a3 black king, d3 white knight

Helpmate in 2: a) diagram, b) replace queen on a6 with a black rook, c) with a bishop, d) with a knight e) with a pawn

Another way of giving variety to the play of a helpmate is twinning. Here, more than one problem is wrought from a single diagram by making small changes to it, such as moving a piece from one square to another, adding or removing a piece, turning the board round or some other device. Twinning is occasionally found in other types of problems, but is particularly common in helpmates. The example shown is a helpmate in 2 by Henry Forsberg (published in 1935 in Revista Romana de Şah). The twins are created by substituting the black queen on a6 with a different piece. The solutions are:

a) diagram position: 1. Qf6 Nc5 2. Qb2 Ra4#
b) with black rook at a6: 1. Rb6 Rb1 2. Rb3 Ra1#
c) with black bishop at a6: 1. Bc4 Ne1 2. Ba2 Nc2#
d) with black knight at a6: 1. Nc5 Nc1 2. Na4 Rb3#
e) with black pawn at a6: 1. a5 Rb3+ 2. Ka4 Nc5#

=== Duplex ===
Milan Vukcevich, June 1961

Position: e8 white king, h8 black knight, d7 white pawn, f7 white pawn, e6 black king, d5 black pawn

Helpmate in 2: a) Black moves first and White checkmates, b) White moves first and Black checkmates

A further variation is the duplex, another way of getting two problems for the price of one. The first problem is a normal helpmate; the second starts from the same position but has White moving first and helping Black to checkmate him. Again, duplex problems have been composed with other types of problems, but the vast majority are helpmates. To the right is an example by Milan Vukcevich (from CHM avec 6 pieces Bad Pyrmont, 1996).

The solution with Black moving first is 1. Ng6 f8=Q 2. Ne5 d8=N#. With White moving first, it is 1. f8=R Nf7 2. d8=B Nd6#. These two lines are closely linked, with two white pawn promotions covering the black king's flight squares in the first part and promoted pieces blocking White's flight squares in the second. This problem is an Allumwandlung, a problem in which pawns are promoted to each of knight, bishop, rook and queen.

=== Unorthodox helpmate problems ===
Very popular today also are helpmates where White moves first; then the stipulation contains a "½", for example a helpmate in 2½ moves. Helpmates, like other problems, can be composed with fairy chess pieces or with fairy conditions (chess variant rules), such as Circe chess, Grid chess, or Patrol chess. All of these variations can be, and have been, combined. (So it is possible to have, for instance, a series-helpmate in 7, twinned with two solutions in each phase, using nightriders and Madrasi chess.) Problems related to helpmates can have other kinds of stipulations involving cooperation between White and Black, in particular seriesmover problems, like seriesmates, serieshelpmates, serieshelpstalemates, etc.

== See also ==
- Selfmate
