= Chess problem =

Chess composition whose solution is a mate or other clear objective

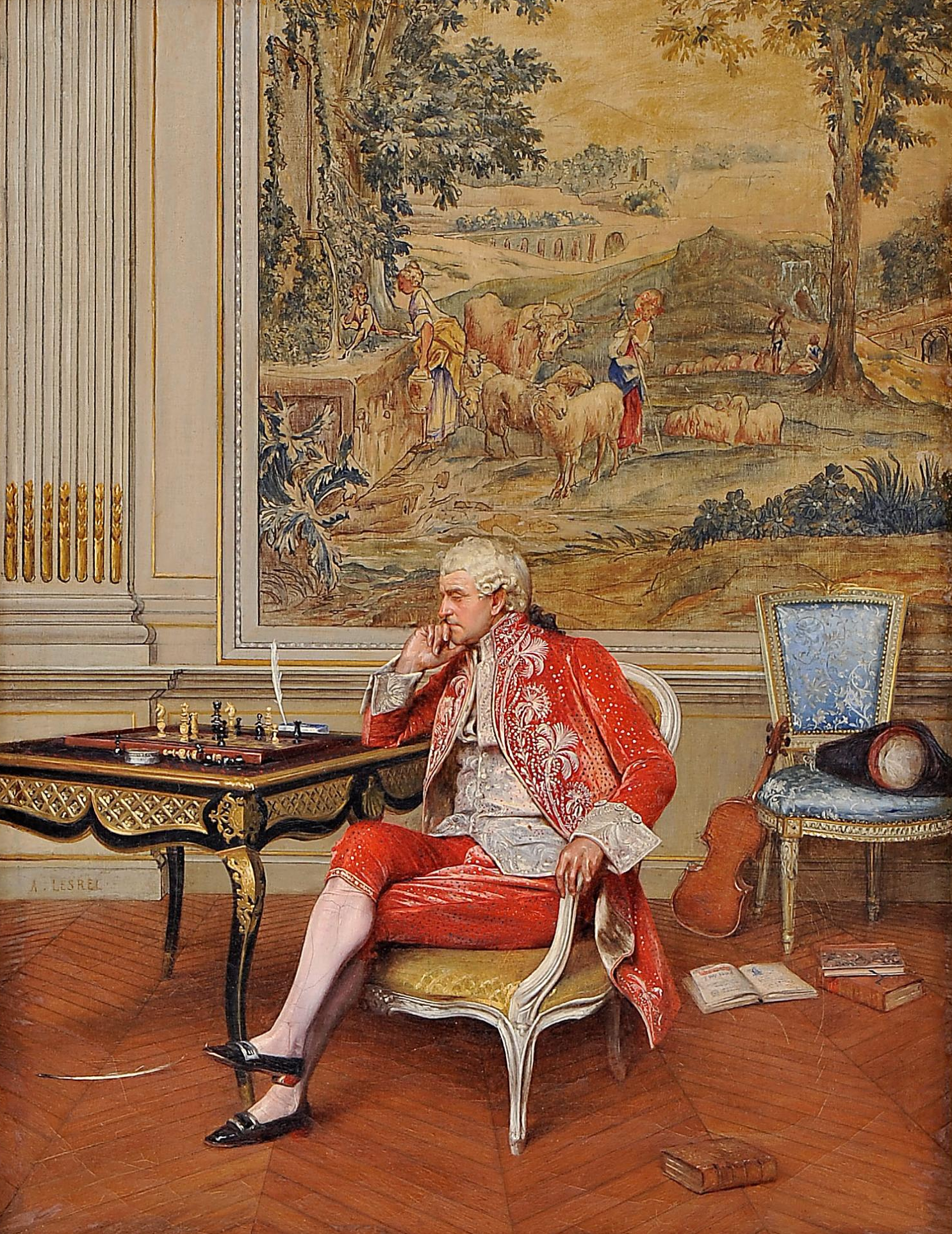
An Interesting Problem, by Adolphe Alexandre Lesrel

A chess problem, also called a chess composition, is a puzzle created by the composer using chess pieces on a chessboard, which presents the solver with a particular task. For instance, a position may be given with the instruction that White is to move first, and checkmate Black in two moves against any possible defence. A chess problem fundamentally differs from over-the-board play in that the latter involves a struggle between Black and White, whereas the former involves a competition between the composer and the solver. Most positions which occur in a chess problem are unrealistic in the sense that they are very unlikely to occur in over-the-board play. There is a substantial amount of specialized jargon used in connection with chess problems.

== Definition ==
The term chess problem is not sharply defined: there is no clear demarcation between chess compositions on the one hand and puzzle or tactical exercises on the other. In practice, however, the distinction is very clear. There are common characteristics shared by compositions in the problem section of chess magazines, in specialist chess problem magazines, and in collections of chess problems in book form.

== Features ==
Not every chess problem has every one of these features, but most have several:

- The position is composed – that is, it has not been taken from an actual game, but has been invented for the specific purpose of providing a problem. Although a constraint on orthodox chess problems is that the original position be reachable via a series of legal moves from the starting position, most problem positions would not arise in over-the-board play.
- There is a specific stipulation, that is, a goal to be achieved; for example, to checkmate Black within a specified number of moves.
- There is a theme (or combination of themes) that the problem has been composed to illustrate: chess problems typically instantiate particular ideas.
- The problem exhibits economy in its construction: no greater force is employed than that required to render the problem sound (that is, to guarantee that the problem's intended solution is indeed a solution and that it is the problem's only solution).
- The problem has aesthetic value. Problems are experienced not only as puzzles but as objects of beauty. This is closely related to the fact that problems are organised to exhibit clear ideas in as economical a manner as possible.

== Tactical puzzles ==
Problems can be contrasted with tactical puzzles often found in chess columns or magazines in which the task is to find the best move or sequence of moves (usually leading to mate or gain of material) from a given position. Such puzzles are often taken from actual games, or at least have positions which look as if they could have arisen during a game, and are used for instructional purposes. Most such puzzles fail to exhibit the above features.

== Types of problems ==
Godfrey Heathcote
Hampstead and Highgate Express,
1905–1906 (1st Prize)

Position: g8 white king, a7 black pawn, b7 white knight, e7 white rook, g7 white pawn, h7 white queen, a6 black pawn, a5 black rook, d5 black king, h5 black rook, a4 white knight, d4 black knight, b3 white pawn, e3 black pawn, a2 white bishop, b2 white bishop, h2 black pawn, c1 white rook, d1 black bishop, g1 black bishop, h1 black queen

White mates in two

Solution: 1.Rcc7! (threatening 2.Nc3)

- 1...Nxb3 2.Qd3#
- 1...Nb5 2.Rc5#
- 1...Nc6 2.Rcd7#
- 1...Ne6 2.Red7#
- 1...Nf5 2.Re5#
- 1...Nf3 2.Qe4#
- 1...Ne2 2.Qxh5#
- 1...Nc2 2.b4#
- 1...Rxa4 2.Rc5#
- 1...Rc5 2.Rxc5#
(When a black knight can move to the maximum number of eight squares like this, it is known as a knight wheel.)
Lutz Neweklowsky, 2001
(after Thompson
& Karrer 2000)

Position: b8 white knight, d8 white bishop, h8 white queen, b7 white rook, c7 white king, e7 black bishop, f6 black queen, g4 black knight, e2 white knight, f2 black knight, g2 black rook, h2 black pawn, b1 white rook, f1 white bishop, g1 black rook, h1 black king

Mate in 267 moves; the longest moremover without obtrusive units

There are various different types of chess problems:

- Directmates: White to move first and checkmate Black within a specified number of moves against any defence. These are often referred to as "mate in n", where n is the number of moves within which mate must be delivered. In composing and solving competitions, directmates are further broken down into three classes:
  - Two-movers: White to move and checkmate Black in two moves against any defence.
  - Three-movers: White to move and checkmate Black in no more than three moves against any defence.
  - More-movers: White to move and checkmate Black in n moves against any defence, where n is some particular number greater than three.
  - Many-movers: White to move and checkmate Black in a great number of moves. Problems have been composed in which White must mate Black in over 100 moves; the current record for such a composition is over 200 moves. These usually involve frequent repetitions of the same manoeuvre in order to force detrimental pawn advances.
- Helpmates: Black to move first cooperates with White to get Black's own king mated in a specified number of moves.
- Selfmates: White moves first and forces Black (in a specified number of moves) to checkmate White.
- Helpselfmates: White to move first cooperates with Black to get a position of selfmate in one move.
- Reflexmates: a form of selfmate with the added stipulation that each side must give mate if it is able to do so. When this stipulation applies only to Black, it is a semi-reflexmate.
- Seriesmovers: one side makes a series of moves without reply to achieve a stipulated aim. Check may not be given except on the last move. A seriesmover may take various forms:
  - Seriesmate: a directmate with White playing a series of moves without reply to checkmate Black.
  - Serieshelpmate: a helpmate in which Black plays a series of moves without reply after which White plays one move to checkmate Black.
  - Seriesselfmate: a selfmate in which White plays a series of moves leading to a position in which Black is forced to give mate.
  - Seriesreflexmate: a reflexmate in which White plays a series of moves leading to a position in which Black can, and therefore must, give mate.
- Studies: an orthodox problem in which the stipulation is that White to play must win or draw. Almost all studies are endgame positions. Studies are composed chess problems, but because their stipulation is open-ended (the win or draw does not have to be achieved within any particular number of moves) they are usually thought of as distinct from problems and as a form of composition that is closer to the puzzles of interest to over-the-board players. Indeed, composed studies have often extended our knowledge of endgame theory. But again, there is no clear dividing line between the two kinds of positions.

In all the above types of problem, castling is assumed to be allowed unless it can be proved by retrograde analysis (see below) that the rook in question or king must have previously moved. En passant captures, on the other hand, are assumed not to be legal, unless it can be proved that the pawn to be captured must have moved two squares on the previous move.

There are several other types of chess problem which do not fall into any of the above categories. Some of these are really coded mathematical problems, expressed using the geometry and pieces of the chessboard. A famous such problem is the knight's tour, in which one is to determine the path of a knight that visits each square of the board exactly once. Another is the eight queens problem, in which eight queens are to be placed on the board so that none is attacking any of the others.

Of far greater relation to standard chess problems, however, are the following, which have a rich history and have been revisited many times, with magazines, books and prizes dedicated to them:

- Retrograde analysis problems: such problems, often also called retros, typically present the solver with a diagram position and a question. In order to answer the question, the solver must work out the history of the position, that is, must work backwards from the given position to the previous move or moves that have been played. A problem employing retrograde analysis may, for example, present a position and ask questions like "What was White's last move?", "Has the bishop on c1 moved?", "Is the black knight actually a promoted pawn?", "Can White castle?", etc. Some retrograde analysis may also have to be employed in more conventional problems (directmates and so on) to determine, for example, whether an en passant pawn capture or castling is possible. The most important subset of retro problems are:
  - Shortest proof games: the solver is given a position and must construct a game, starting from the normal game array, which ends in that position. The two sides cooperate to reach the position, but all moves must be legal. Usually the number of moves required to reach the position is given, though sometimes the task is simply to reach the given position in the smallest number of moves.
- Construction tasks: no diagram is given in construction tasks; instead, the aim is to construct a game or position with certain features. For example, Sam Loyd devised the problem: "Construct a game which ends with black delivering discovered checkmate on move four" (published in Le Sphinx, 1866 – the solution is 1.f3 e5 2.Kf2 h5 3.Kg3 h4+ 4.Kg4 d5#); while all White moves are unique (see Beauty in chess problems), the Black ones are not. A unique problem is: "Construct a game with black b-pawn checkmating on move four" (from Shortest construction tasks map in External links section; the unique solution is 1.d4 c6 2.Kd2 Qa5+ 3.Kd3 Qa3+ 4.Kc4 b5#). Some construction tasks ask for a maximum or minimum number of effects to be arranged, for example a game with the maximum possible number of consecutive discovered checks, or a position in which all sixteen pieces control the minimum number of squares. A special class are games uniquely determined by their last move like "3...Rxe5+" or "4...b5#" from above.

Across most of the above genres, there is great interest in exploring fairy chess, in which non-standard boards, pieces or rules apply.

== Beauty in chess problems ==
Black mating on move 5 by promoting to knight

The role of aesthetic evaluation in the appreciation of chess problems is very significant, and indeed most composers and solvers consider such compositions to be an art form. Vladimir Nabokov wrote about the "originality, invention, conciseness, harmony, complexity, and splendid insincerity" of creating chess problems and spent considerable time doing so. There are no official standards by which to distinguish a beautiful problem from a poor one and such judgments can vary from individual to individual as well as from generation to generation. Such variation is to be expected when it comes to aesthetic appraisal. Nevertheless, modern taste generally recognises the following elements to be important in the aesthetic evaluation of a problem:

- The problem position must be legal. That is to say, the diagram must be reachable by legal moves beginning with the initial game array. It is not considered a defect if the diagram can only be reached via a game containing what over-the-board players would consider gross blunders.
- The first move of the problem's solution (the key move or key) must be unique. A problem which has two keys is said to be cooked and is judged to be unsound or defective. (Exceptions are problems which are composed to have more than one solution which are thematically related to one another in some way; this type of problem is particularly common in helpmates.)
- Ideally, in directmates, there should be a unique White move after each Black move. A choice of White moves (other than the key) is a dual. Duals are often tolerated if the problem is strong in other regards and if the duals occur in lines of play that are subsidiary to the main theme.
- The solution should illustrate a theme or themes, rather than emerging from disjointed calculation. Many of the more common themes have been given names by problemists (see chess problem terminology for a list).
- The key move of the solution should not be obvious. Obvious moves such as checks, captures, and (in directmates) moves which restrict the movement of the black king make for bad keys. Keys which deprive the black king of some squares to which it could initially move (flight squares), but at the same time make available an equal or greater number of flight squares are acceptable. Key moves which prevent the enemy from playing a checking move are also undesirable, particularly in cases where there is no mate provided after the checking move. In general, the weaker (in terms of ordinary over-the-board play) the key move is the less obvious it will be, and hence the more highly prized it will be.
- There should be no promoted pawns in the initial position. For example, if White has three knights, one of them must clearly have been promoted; the same is true of two light-square bishops. There are more subtle cases: if f1 is empty, a white bishop stands on b5 and there are white pawns on e2 and g2, then the bishop must be a promoted pawn (there is no way the original bishop could have gotten past those unmoved pawns). A piece such as this, which does not leave a player with pieces additional to those at the start of a game, but which nonetheless must have been promoted, is called obtrusive. The presence of obtrusive units constitutes a smaller flaw than the presence of more obviously promoted units.
- The problem should be economical. There are several facets to this desideratum. For one thing, every piece on the board should serve a purpose, either to enable the actual solution, or to exclude alternative solutions. Extra units should not be added to create "red herrings" (this is called dressing the board), except in rare cases where this is part of the theme. If the theme can be shown with fewer total units, it should be. For another, the problem should not employ more moves than is needed to exhibit the particular theme(s) at its heart; if the theme can be shown in fewer moves, it should be.

== Examples ==
Thomas Taverner
Dubuque Chess Journal,
1889 (1st Prize)

Position: d8 black bishop, e8 black rook, f8 black rook, g8 black bishop, c7 white knight, h7 white bishop, c5 black pawn, h5 white queen, c4 black pawn, f4 black king, f3 white pawn, e2 white pawn, g2 white king, h2 white rook, c1 white knight, f1 white rook, g1 white bishop

White mates in two

To the right is a directmate problem composed by Thomas Taverner in 1881.

The key move is 1.Rh1. This is difficult to find because it makes no threat – instead, it puts Black in zugzwang, a situation in which the player must move, yet every move leads to a disadvantage. Each of Black's nineteen legal replies allows an immediate mate. For example, if Black defends with 1...Bxh7, the d5-square is no longer guarded, and White mates with 2.Nd5#. Or if Black plays 1...Re5, Black blocks that escape square for his king allowing 2.Qg4#. If Black plays 1...Rf6, then 2.Rh4#. Yet if Black could only pass (i.e., make no move at all), White would have no way to mate on his second move. The full solution is as follows:

1 Rh1! and now:

1...Bxh7, 2.Nd5# (unguards d5)
1...Bf7, 2.Qf5# (interferes with rook’s guard of f5)
1...Be6, 2.e3# (interferes with rook’s guard of e3)
1...Bd5, 2.Nxd5# (unguards d5)
1...Bxc7, 2.Rh4# (unguards h4)
1...Be7, 2.e3# (interferes with rook’s guard of e3)
1...Bf6, 2.Qf5# (interferes with rook’s guard of f5)
1...Bg5, 2.Qh2# (blocks king’s flight to g5)
1...Bh4, 2.Rxh4# (unguards h4)
1...Rf7, 2.Nd5# (interferes with bishop’s guard of d5)
1...Rf6, 2.Rh4# (interferes with bishop’s guard of h4)
1...Rf5, 2.Qxf5# (unguards f5)
1...Re7, 2.Rh4# (interferes with bishop’s guard of h4)
1...Re6, 2.Nd5# (interferes with bishop’s guard of d5)
1...Re5, 2.Qg4# (blocks king’s flight to e5)
1...Re4, 2.fxe4# (allows pawn capture discovering check)
1...Re3, 2.Bh2# (blocks king’s flight to e3)
1...Rxe2+, 2.Nxe2# (allows capture on unguarded square e2)
1...c3, 2.Nd3# (unguards d3)

The thematic approach to solving is to notice then that in the original position, Black is already almost in zugzwang. If Black were compelled to play first, only Re3 and Bg5 would not allow immediate mate. However, each of those two moves blocks a flight square for the black king, and once White has removed his rook from h2 White can put some other piece on that square to deliver mate: 1...Re3 2.Bh2# and 1...Bg5 2.Qh2#.

The arrangement of the black rooks and bishops, with a pair of adjacent rooks flanked by a pair of bishops, is known to problemists as Organ Pipes. This arrangement is designed to illustrate the effect of mutual Black interferences: for example, consider what happens after the key if Black plays 1...Bf7. White now mates with 2.Qf5#, a move which is only possible because the bishop Black moved has got in the way of the rook's guard of f5 – this is known as a self-interference. Similarly, if Black tries 1...Rf7, this interferes with the bishop's guard of d5, allowing White to mate with Nd5#. Mutual interferences like this, between two pieces on one square, are known as Grimshaw interferences, and are the theme of this problem. The problem exhibits four such interferences, on squares e6, e7, f6, and f7.

Position: e8 white king, c5 white knight, f5 white knight, d4 white queen, h4 white bishop, c3 white pawn, e3 white rook, a2 black pawn, b2 black pawn, c2 black pawn, d2 black pawn, e2 black pawn, f2 black pawn, g2 black pawn, h2 black pawn, a1 black rook, b1 black knight, c1 black bishop, d1 black queen, e1 black king, f1 black bishop, g1 black knight, h1 black rook

White mates in one move!

Some problems involve a humorous trick or twist. The problem to the right, shown in Norwegian broadcaster NRK's airings from the World Championships in Dubai 2021, calls for White to mate in just one move. The trick is to recognize that despite the arrangement of the black pieces, the board is actually viewed from the white side, as shown by the black king standing on a square of its own color, rather than on the opposite color as in the standard opening position. Thus the solution is 1.Nd3#; the knight is behind the black pawns and cannot be captured.

== Abbreviations ==
For reasons of space and internationality, various abbreviations are often used in chess problem journals to indicate a problem's stipulation (whether it is a mate in two, helpmate in four, or whatever). The most common are:

- "#" abbreviates checkmate
- "=" abbreviates stalemate (occasionally "p", standing for "pat", the French for stalemate, is used instead)
- "h" abbreviates helpmate
- "s" abbreviates selfmate
- "r" abbreviates reflexmate
- "ser-" abbreviates series

These are combined with a number to indicate in how many moves the goal must be achieved. "#3", therefore, indicates a mate in three, while "ser-h=14" indicates a series help stalemate in 14 (i.e., Black makes 14 moves in a row such that White can subsequently make one move to deliver stalemate).

In studies, the symbols "+" and "=" are used to indicate "White to play and win" and "White to play and draw" respectively.

== Tournaments ==
Various tournaments (or tourneys) exist for both the composition and solving of chess problems.

=== Composition tournaments ===
Composition tourneys may be formal or informal. In formal tourneys, the competing problems are not published before they are judged, while in informal tourneys they are. Informal tourneys are often run by problem magazines and other publications with a regular problem section; it is common for every problem to have been published in a particular magazine within a particular year to be eligible for an informal award. Formal tourneys are often held to commemorate a particular event or person. The World Chess Composing Tournament (WCCT) is a formal tourney for national teams organised by the Permanent Commission of the FIDE for Chess Compositions (PCCC).

In both formal and informal tourneys, entries will normally be limited to a particular genre of problem (for example, mate in twos, moremovers, helpmates) and may or may not have additional restrictions (for example, problems in patrol chess, problems showing the Lacny theme, problems using fewer than nine units). Honours are usually awarded in three grades: these are, in descending order of merit, prizes, honourable mentions, and commendations. As many problems as the judge sees fit may be placed in each grade, and the problems within each grade may or may not be ranked (so an award may include a 1st Honourable Mention, a 2nd Honourable Mention, and a 3rd Honourable Mention, or just three unranked Honourable Mentions).

After an award is published, there is a period (typically around three months) in which individuals may claim honoured problems are anticipated (that is, that an identical problem, or nearly so, had been published at an earlier date) or unsound (i.e., that a problem has cooks or no solution). If such claims are upheld, the award may be adjusted accordingly. At the end of this period, the award becomes final. It is normal to indicate any honour a problem has received when it is republished.

=== Solving tournaments ===
Solving tournaments also fall into two main types. In tourneys conducted by correspondence, the participants send their entries by post or e-mail. These are often run on similar terms to informal composition tourneys; indeed, the same problems which are entries in the informal composition tourney are often also set in the solving tourney. It is impossible to eliminate the use of computers in such tournaments, though some problems, such as those with particularly long solutions, will not be well-suited to solution by computer.

Other solving tourneys are held with all participants present at a particular time and place. They have only a limited amount of time to solve the problems, and the use of any solving aid other than a chess set is prohibited. The most notable tournament of this type is the World Chess Solving Championship, organised by the PCCC.

In both types of tourney, each problem is worth a specified number of points, often with bonus points for finding cooks or correctly claiming no solution. Incomplete solutions are awarded an appropriate proportion of the points available. The solver amassing the most points is the winner.

== Titles ==
Just as in over-the-board play, the titles Grandmaster, International Master and FIDE Master are awarded by FIDE via the Permanent Commission of the FIDE for Chess Compositions (PCCC) for especially distinguished problem and study composers and solvers (unlike over-the-board chess, however, there have not been any women-only equivalents to these titles in problem chess).

For composition, the International Master title was established in 1959, with André Chéron, Arnoldo Ellerman, Alexander Gerbstmann, Jan Hartong, Cyril Kipping and Marian Wróbel being the first honorary recipients. In subsequent years, qualification for the IM title, as well as for the GM title (first awarded in 1972 to Genrikh Kasparyan, Lev Loshinsky, Comins Mansfield, and Eeltje Visserman) and the FM title (first awarded 1990) has been determined on the basis of the number of problems or studies a composer had selected for publication in the FIDE Albums. These albums are collections of the best problems and studies composed in a particular three-year period, as selected by FIDE-appointed judges from submitted entries. Each problem published in an album is worth 1 point; each study is worth 1 2/3; joint compositions are worth the same divided by the number of composers. For the FIDE Master title, a composer must accumulate 12 points; for the International Master title, 25 points are needed; and for the Grandmaster title, a composer must have 70 points.

For solvers, the GM and IM titles were both first awarded in 1982; the FM title followed in 1997. GM and IM titles can only be gained by participating in the official World Chess Solving Championship (WCSC): to become a GM, a solver must score at least 90 percent of the winner's points and on each occasion finish in at least tenth place three times within ten successive WCSCs. For the IM title they must score at least 80 percent of the winner's points and each time finish in at least fifteenth place twice within five successive WCSCs; alternatively, winning a single WCSC or scoring as many points as the winner in a single WCSC will earn the IM title. For the FM title, the solver must score at least 75 percent of the winners points and each time finish within the top 40 percent of participants in any two PCCC-approved solving competitions.

The title International Judge of Chess Compositions is given to individuals considered capable of judging composing tourneys at the highest level.

== See also ==
- Chess composer
- Glossary of chess problems
- Chess aesthetics
- Software for handling chess problems
