= Outline of chess =

Overview of and topical guide to chess

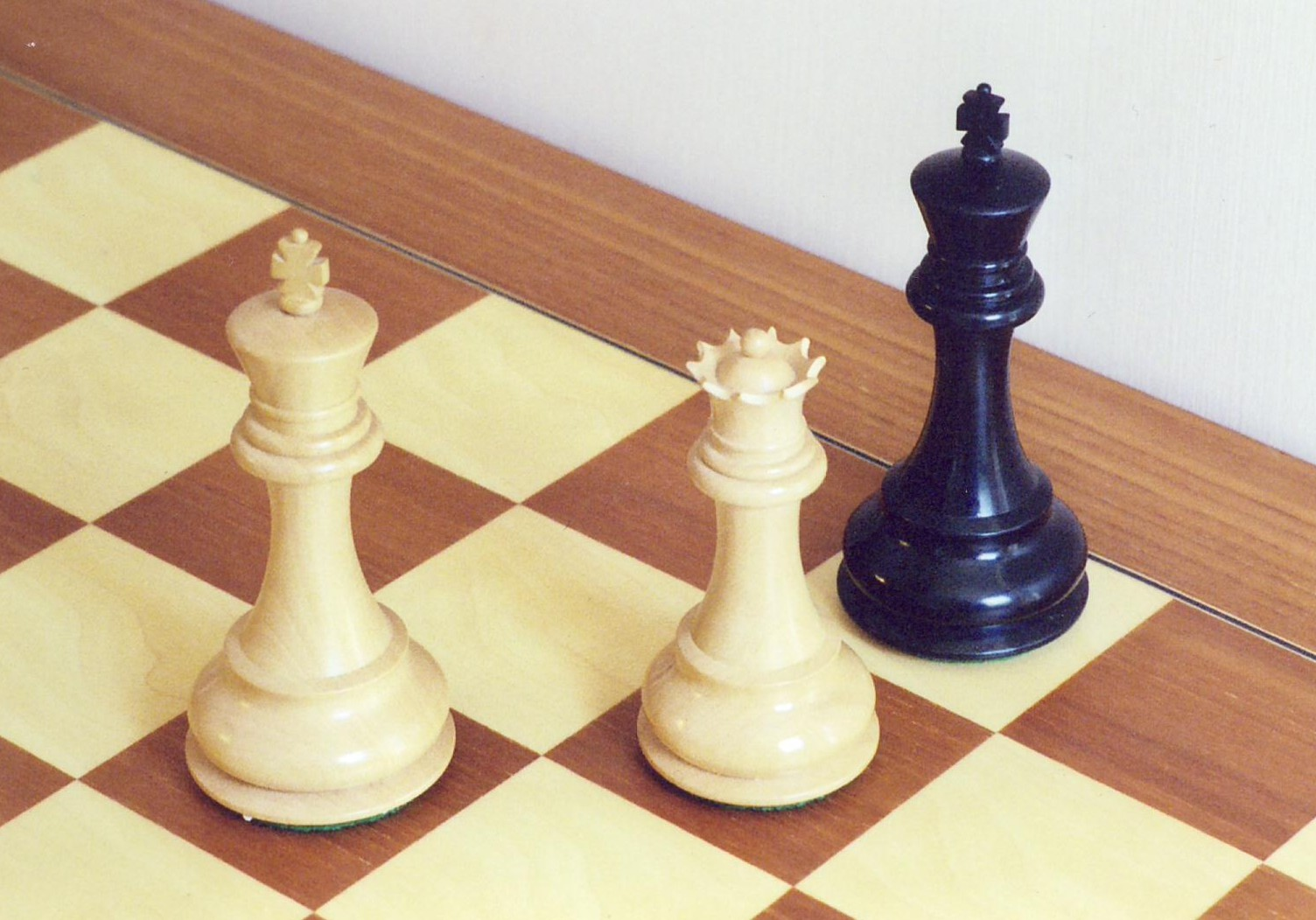
Checkmate

The following outline is provided as an overview of and topical guide to chess:

Chess is a two-player strategy board game played on a chessboard with 32 pieces.

== Descriptions of chess ==
Chess can be described as all of the following:

- Form of entertainment – form of activity that holds the attention and interest of an audience, or gives pleasure and delight.
  - Form of recreation – activity of leisure, leisure being discretionary time.
    - Form of play – voluntary, intrinsically motivated activity normally associated with recreational pleasure and enjoyment.
      - Game – structured playing, usually undertaken for enjoyment and sometimes used as an educational tool.
        - Board game – game in which counters or pieces are placed, removed, or moved on a pre-marked surface or "board" according to a set of rules.
        - Strategy game – Game in which the players' decision-making skills have a high significance in determining the outcome.
        - Two-player game – game played by just two players, usually against each other.
      - Sport – form of play, but sport is also a category of entertainment in its own right (see immediately below for description)
  - Sport – Competitive, entertaining, and skillful activity. It has rules and a winner can be decided by objective means.
    - Mind sport – game where the outcome is determined mainly by mental skill, rather than by pure chance.

== Chess equipment ==
=== Essential equipment ===
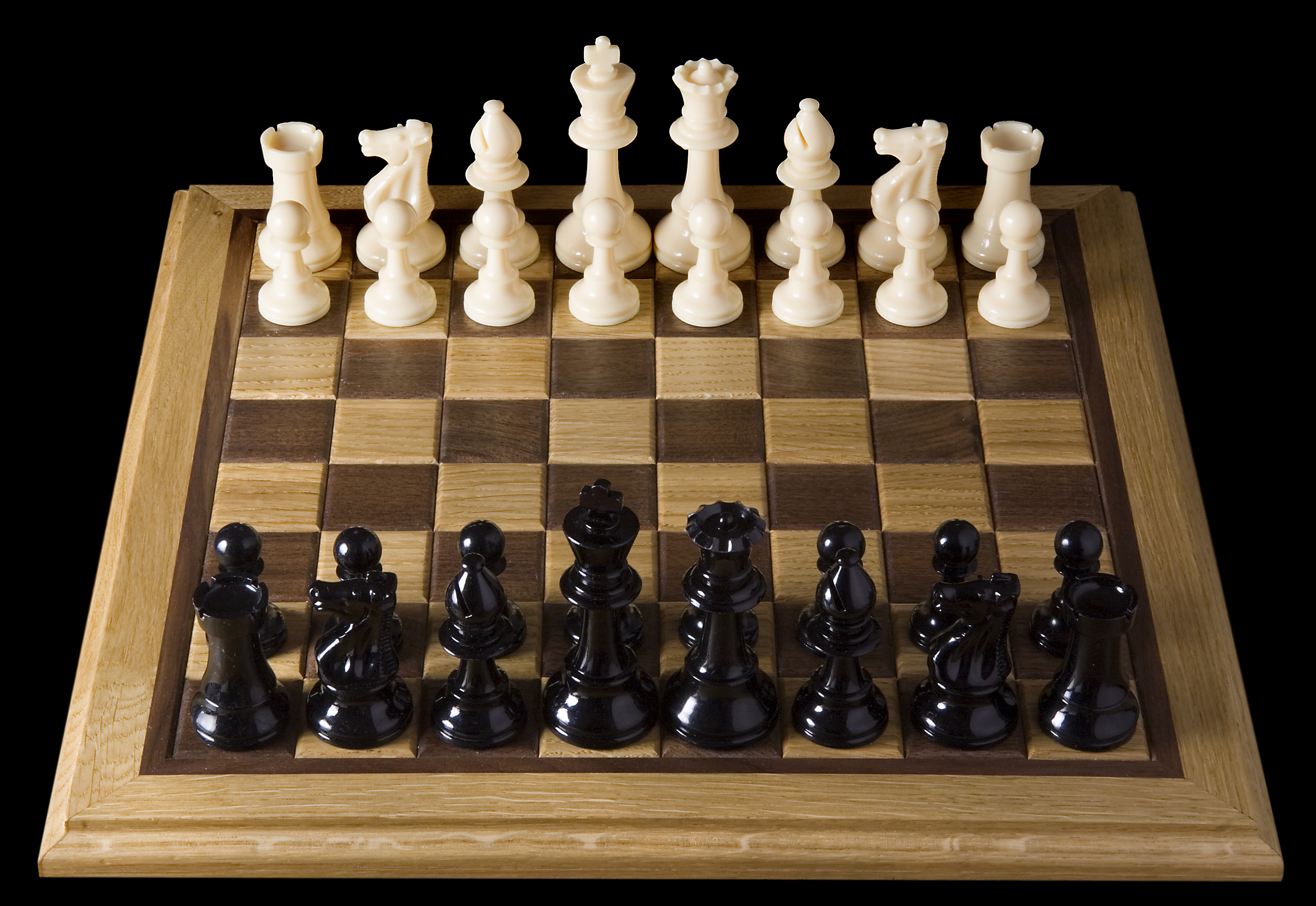
Opening chess position from black side

- Chess set – Equipment required to play a game of chess, they come in various materials and styles.
  - Chessboard – Board with 64 squares arranged in two alternating colors.
    - Rank – horizontal row of squares on the chessboard.
    - File – vertical (i.e. in the direction from one player to the other) column of squares on the chessboard.
  - 32 chess pieces in two colors, referred to as "white" and "black".
    - 2 kings
    - 2 queens – Some chess sets have 2 queens of each color, to deal with promotions.
    - 4 rooks
    - 4 bishops
    - 4 knights
    - 16 pawns

=== Specialized equipment ===
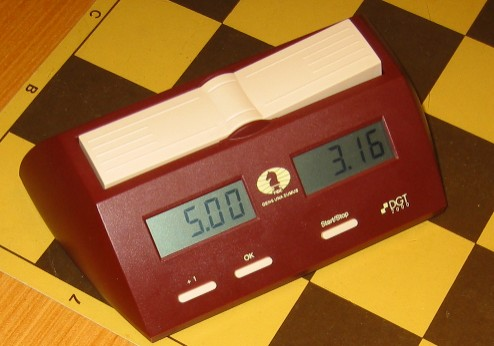
Chess clock on a chess table

- Chess clock – Dual timer used to monitor each player's thinking time. Used for speed chess, and to regulate time in tournament games.
- Chess table – Table built with features to make it useful for playing chess, most are made of wood.
- Score sheet and writing implement – Tournament games require scores to be kept, and many players like to record other games for later analysis.

== Rules of chess ==
- Initial set up – initial placement of the pieces on the chessboard before any moves are made.
- Cheating in chess – methods that have been used to gain an unfair advantage by breaking the rules.

=== Moves ===
- White and Black in chess – one player is designated "white", the other is designated "black", white moves first.
- Capture – move of a piece to a square occupied by an opposing piece, which is removed from the board and from play.
- Check – situation in which the king would be subject to capture (but the king is never actually captured).
- Checkmate – a move that makes capture of the opposing king inevitable. The player making the move wins the game

=== Piece-specific moves ===
- Moving a pawn – pawns move straight forward one space at a time, but capture diagonally (within a one-square range). On its first move, a pawn may move two squares forward instead (with no capturing allowed in a two-square move). Also, pawns are subject to the en passant and promotion movement rules (see below).
  - En passant – on the very next move after a player moves a pawn two squares forward from its starting position, an opposing pawn that is guarding the skipped square may capture the pawn (taking it "as it passes"), by moving to the passed square as if the pawn had stopped there. If this is not done on the very next move, the right to do so is lost.
  - Pawn promotion – when a pawn reaches its eighth rank it is exchanged for the player's choice of a queen, rook, bishop or knight (usually a queen, since it is the most powerful piece).
- Moving a knight – knights move two squares horizontally and one square vertically from their original position, or two squares vertically and one square horizontally, jumping directly to the destination while ignoring any pieces in the intervening spaces.
- Moving a bishop – bishops move any distance in a diagonal line in any direction. One bishop in each army moves diagonally on white squares only, and the other bishop is restricted to moving along black squares.
- Moving a rook – rooks may move any distance along a rank or a file (forward, backward, left, or right), and can also be used for castling (see below).
- Moving the queen – queens can move like a rook or like a bishop (horizontally, vertically, or diagonally), but no castling.
- Moving the king – kings may move one square in any direction, but may not move into check. It may also make a special move called "castling".
  - Castling – special move available to each player once in the game (with restrictions, see below) where the king is moved two squares to the left or right and the rook on that side is moved to the other side of the king.
    - Requirements for castling – Castling is legal if the following conditions are all met:
      - 1. Neither the king nor the rook involved have previously moved.
      - 2. There are no pieces in between the king and chosen rook.
      - 3. The king is not currently in check. (For clarification, the involved rook may be currently under attack. Additionally, the king may have previously been in check, as long as the king did not move to resolve it.)
      - 4. The king does not pass through a square that is under attack by an enemy piece. (For clarification, the rook may pass through a square that is under attack by an enemy piece; the only such square is the one adjacent to the rook when castling queenside, b1 for White and b8 for Black.)
      - 5. The king does not end in a square that is under attack by an enemy piece.

=== End of the game ===
- Resigning – a player may end the game by resigning, which cedes victory to the opponent. Above beginner level it is usually considered good etiquette to resign in a hopeless position.
- Checkmate – object of the game – a king is in check and has no move to get out of check, losing the game.
- Draw – neither side wins or loses. In competition this usually counts as a half-win for each player.
  - Draw by agreement – players may agree that the game is a draw.
  - Stalemate – if the player whose turn it is to move has no legal move and is not in check, the game is a draw by stalemate.
  - Fifty-move rule – if within the last fifty moves by both sides, no pawn has moved and there have been no captures, a player may claim a draw. (And the arbiter must stop the game after 75 moves, which is still a draw, the only difference being that this is forced, and it's not by agreement of players like the fifty-move-rule.)
  - Threefold repetition – if the same position has occurred three times with the same player to move, a player may claim a draw.
    - Perpetual check – situation in which one king cannot escape an endless series of checks but cannot be checkmated. This was formerly a rule of chess to result in a draw, and still used informally, but superseded by the threefold repetition rule and fifty-move rule, which make it implicit.
    - Abandonment — In very rare cases, the player leaves the board on their move. While under the rules of the game the opponent must wait for the abandoned player's clock to flag, this is usually an automatic win. This is most common in online chess platforms.

=== Competition rules and other features ===
- Adjournment – play stops, and the game is resumed later. This has become rare since the advent of computer analysis of chess games.
- Chess notation – system of recording chess moves.
  - Algebraic chess notation – standard method of recording moves, required for use in competition.
  - Descriptive chess notation – obsolete method of recording moves, it was widely used, especially in English- and Spanish-speaking countries until about 1980.
  - Forsyth–Edwards Notation (FEN) – standard method for recording chess positions, an alternative to chess diagrams.
- Time control – each player must complete either a specified number of moves or all of his moves before a certain time elapses on his clock.
- Touch-move rule – if a player touches his own piece, he must move it if it has a legal move. If he touches an opponent's piece, he must capture it if he can legally.

=== Minor variants ===
- Blindfold chess – one or both players play without seeing the board and pieces.
- Chess handicap – one of the players gives a handicap to the other player, usually starting the game without a certain piece.
- Fast chess – chess played with a time control limiting each player to a specified time of 60 minutes or less (can be as low as 1 minute).

== Gameplay ==
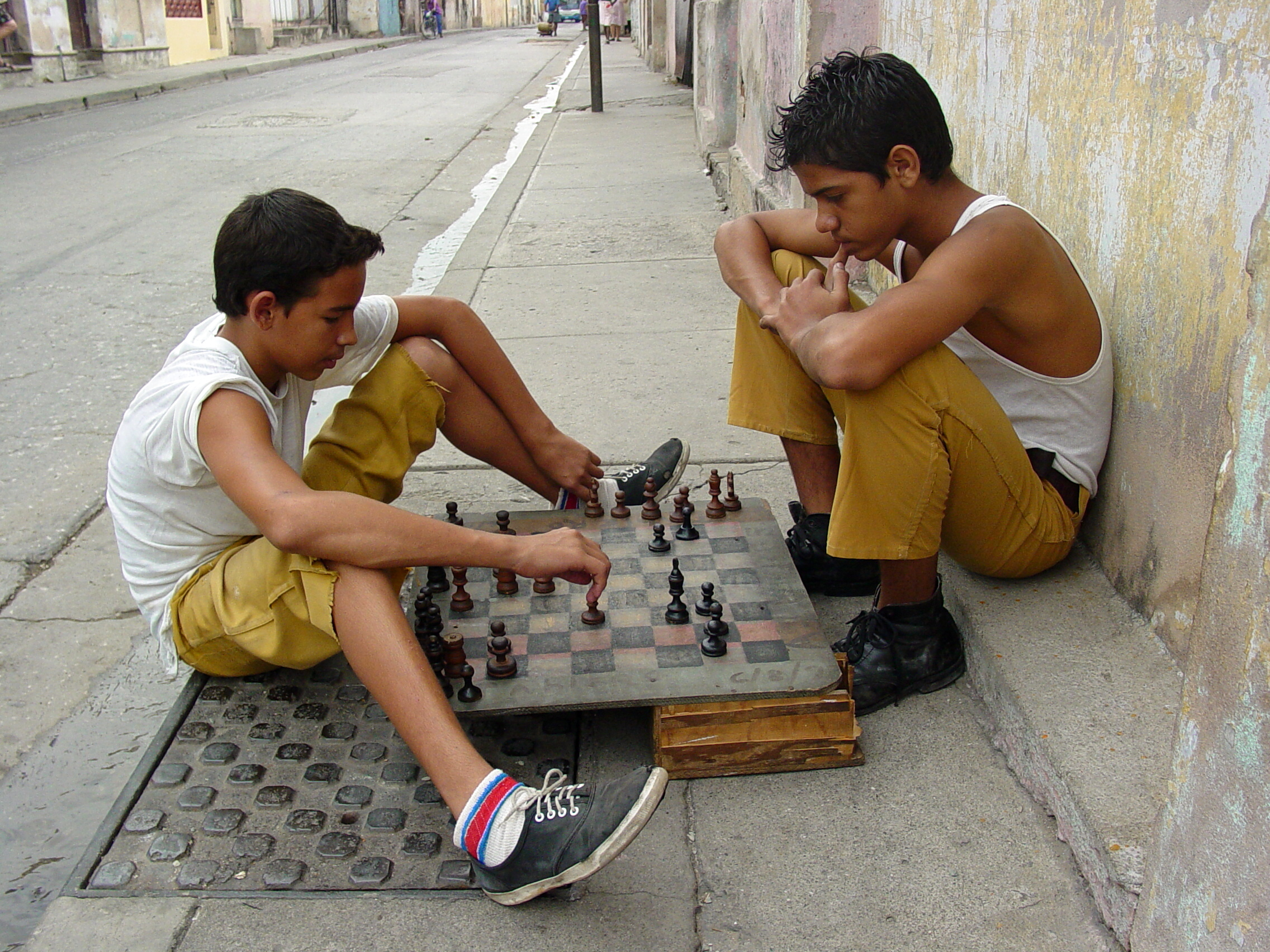
Children playing chess on the street

- Blunder – very bad move.
- Candidate move – move that upon initial observation of the position, warrants further analysis. Spotting these moves is the key to higher-level play.
- Compensation – having positional advantages in spite of material disadvantages.
- Chess handicap – Way to enable a weaker player to have a chance of winning against a stronger one.
- Chess piece relative value – relative value of chess pieces, based on their relative power.
- Premove – used in fast online games, it refers to a player making his next move while his opponent is thinking about his move. After the opponent's move, the premove will be made, if legal, taking either no time at all, or only taking 0.1 seconds on the game clock.
- Priyome – typical maneuver or technique in chess.
- Ply – half-turn, that is, one player's portion of a turn.
- Tempo – a "unit" similar to time, equal to one chess move, e.g. to lose a tempo is to waste a move or give the opponent the opportunity of an extra move. Sometimes a player may want to lose a tempo.

=== General situations ===
- En prise – when an unguarded piece is in position to be captured.
- Initiative – situational advantage in which a player can make threats that cannot be ignored, forcing the opponent to use his turns to respond to threats rather than make his own.
- Transposition – sequence of moves resulting in a position which may also be reached by another common sequence of moves. Transpositions are particularly common in openings, where a given position may be reached by different sequences of moves. Players sometimes use transpositions deliberately in order to avoid variations they dislike, lure opponents into unfamiliar or uncomfortable territory or simply to worry opponents.
- Time trouble – having little thinking time left in a timed game, thereby increasing the likelihood of making weak or losing moves or overlooking strong or winning moves.
- Zugzwang – German for "move obligation" or "forced move", a situation in which a player would prefer to pass and make no move, because he has no move that does not worsen his position, but move he must!

=== Pawn structure ===
- Backward pawn – pawn that is not supported by other pawns and cannot advance.
- Connected pawns – pawns of the same color on adjacent files so that they can protect each other.
- Doubled pawns – two pawns of the same color on the same file, so that one blocks the other.
- Half-open file – file that has pawns of one color only.
- Isolated pawn – pawn with no pawns of the same color on adjacent files.
- Maróczy Bind – formation with white pawns on c4 and e4, after the exchange of White's d-pawn for Black's c-pawn.
- Open file – file void of pawns.
- Passed pawn – pawn that can advance to its eighth rank without being blocked by an opposing pawn and without the possibility of being captured by a pawn on an adjacent file.

=== Chess tactics ===
- Anti-computer tactics – tactics used by humans in games against computers that the program cannot handle very well
- Capture – to remove an opposing piece from the board by taking it with one of your own. Except in the case of an en passant capture, the capturing man replaces the captured man on its square. Also, a move that captures. Captures can be executed offensively or defensively.
- Combination – series of moves, often with an exchange or sacrifice, to achieve some advantage.
- Exchange – capturing a piece in return for allowing another piece to be captured.
  - The exchange – exchange of a bishop or knight for a rook. The rook is generally the stronger piece unless a player obtains other advantages for allowing the exchange.
- Flight square – square that the king can retreat to, if attacked.

==== Fundamental tactics ====
Fundamental tactics include:

- Battery – two or more pieces that can move and attack along a shared path, situated on the same rank, file, or diagonal; e.g., the queen and a bishop, or the queen and a rook, or both rooks, or the queen and both rooks.
- Block (blocking an attack) – interposing a piece between another piece and its attacker. When the piece being attacked is the king, this is blocking a check.
- Deflection – tactic that forces an opposing piece to leave the square, rank or file it occupies, thus exposing the king or a valuable piece.
- Discovered attack – moving a piece uncovers an attack by another piece along a straight line
- Fork – attack on two or more pieces by one piece
- Interference – blocking the line along which an enemy piece is defended, leaving it vulnerable to capture.
- Overloading – giving a defensive piece an additional defensive assignment which it cannot complete without abandoning its original defensive assignment.
- Pin – piece is under attack and either cannot legally move because it would put its king in check or should not move because it will allow an attack on a more valuable piece.
- Skewer – if a piece under attack moves it will allow an attack on another piece
- Undermining – capturing a defensive piece, leaving one of the opponent's pieces undefended or underdefended. Also known as "removal of the guard".
- X-ray – (1) synonym for skewer. The term is also sometimes used to refer to a tactic where a piece either (2) indirectly attacks an enemy piece through another piece or pieces or (3) defends a friendly piece through an enemy piece.

==== Offensive tactics ====
- Battery – two or more pieces that can move and attack along a shared path, situated on the same rank, file, or diagonal; e.g., the queen and a bishop, or the queen and a rook, or both rooks, or the queen and both rooks.
  - Alekhine's gun – formation named after the former World Chess Champion, Alexander Alekhine, which consists of placing the two rooks stacked one behind another and the queen at the rear.
- Cross-check – tactic in which a check is played in response to a check, especially when the original check is blocked by a piece that itself either delivers check or reveals a discovered check from another piece.
- Decoy – ensnaring a piece, usually the king or queen, by forcing it to move to a poisoned square with a sacrifice on that square.
- Deflection – forces an opposing piece to leave the square, rank or file it occupies, thus exposing the king or a valuable piece.
- Discovered attack – attack revealed when one piece moves out of the way of another.
  - Discovered check – discovered attack that is also a check
- Domination – occurs when a piece has a relatively wide choice of destination squares, but nevertheless cannot avoid being captured.
- Double attack – attack on two pieces at once, such as in a fork, or via a discovered attack where the piece that was blocked attacks one piece while the piece moving out of the way threatens another.
  - Double check – check delivered by two pieces at the same time. In chess notation, it is sometimes symbolized by "++".
- Fork – when a piece attacks two or more enemy pieces at the same time.
- Interference – interrupting the line between an attacked piece and its defender by sacrificially interposing a piece. Opportunities for interference are rare because the defended object must be more valuable than the sacrificed piece, and the interposition must itself represent a threat.
- King walk – several successive movements of the king, usually in the endgame to get it from a safe square (where it was hiding during the middlegame) to a more active position. Not to be confused with "king hunt", where a player forces his opponent's king out of safety and chases it across the board with a series of checks.
- Outpost – square where a piece can attack the opponent's position without being attacked by enemy pawns. Knights are good pieces to occupy outposts.
- Overloading – giving a defensive piece an additional defensive assignment which it cannot complete without abandoning its original defensive assignment.
- Pawn promotion – moving a pawn to the back row to be promoted to a knight, a bishop, a rook, or a queen. While this is a rule, it is also a type of move, with tactical significance. Pawn promotion, or the threat of it, often decides the result of a chess endgame.
  - Underpromotion – promotion to a knight, bishop, or rook is known as an "underpromotion". Although these pieces are less powerful than the queen, there are some situations where it is advantageous to underpromote. For example, since the knight moves in a way which the queen cannot, knight underpromotions can be very useful, and are the most common type of underpromotion. Promoting to a rook or bishop is advantageous in cases where promoting to a queen would result in an immediate stalemate.
  - In FIDE tournament play, spare queens are provided, one of each colour. In a tournament match between Emil Szalanczy and Thi Mai Hung Nguyen in Budapest, 2009, six queens were on the board at the same time.
- Pawn storm – several pawns are moved in rapid succession toward the opponent's defenses.
- Pin – piece is under attack and either cannot legally move because it would put its king in check or should not move because it will allow an attack on a more valuable piece.
  - Absolute pin – pin against the king is called absolute since the pinned piece cannot legally move (as moving it would expose the king to check).
  - Relative pin – where the piece shielded by the pinned piece is a piece other than the king, but typically more valuable than the pinned piece.
  - Partial pin – when a rook or queen is pinned along a file or rank, or a bishop or queen is pinned along a diagonal
  - Situational pin – when a pinned piece is shielding a square and moving out of the way will allow the enemy to move there, resulting in a detrimental situation for the player of the pinned piece, such as checkmate.
- Sacrifice – move which deliberately allows the loss of material, either because the player can win the material back or deliver checkmate if it is taken (sham sacrifice or pseudosacrifice), or because the player judges he will have positional compensation (true or positional sacrifice).
  - Greek gift sacrifice – typical sacrifice of a bishop by White playing Bxh7+ or Black playing Bxh2+.
  - Queen sacrifice – sacrifice of the queen, invariably tactical in nature.
  - Plachutta – a piece sacrifices itself on a square where it could be captured by two different pieces in order to deflect them both from crucial squares.
- Skewer – attack upon two pieces in a line and is similar to a pin. In fact, a skewer is sometimes described as a "reverse pin"; the difference is that in a skewer, the more valuable piece is in front of the piece of lesser or equal value.
  - Absolute skewer – when the King is skewered, forcing him to move out of check, exposing the piece behind him in the line of attack.
  - Relative skewer – the skewered piece can be moved, but doesn't have to be (because it is not the King in check).
- Swindle – ruse by which a player in a losing position tricks his opponent, and thereby achieves a win or draw instead of the expected loss. It may also refer more generally to obtaining a win or draw from a clearly losing position.
- The exchange – see § Chess tactics above
- Triangulation – technique of making three moves to wind up in the same position while the opponent has to make two moves to wind up in the same position. The reason is to lose a tempo and put the opponent in zugzwang.
- Undermining – capturing a defensive piece, leaving one of the opponent's pieces undefended or underdefended. Also known as "removal of the guard".
- Windmill – repeated series of discovered checks which the opponent cannot avoid, winning large amounts of material.
- X-ray attack – indirect attack of a piece through another piece.
- Zwischenzug ("Intermediate move") – To make an intermediate move before the expected move to gain an advantage.

===== Checkmate patterns =====
Checkmate pattern – a particular checkmate. Some checkmate patterns occur sufficiently frequently, or are otherwise of such interest to scholars, that they have acquired specific names in chess commentary. Here are some of the most notorious:

- Back-rank checkmate – checkmate accomplished by a rook or queen on the opponent's first rank, because the king is blocked in by its own pieces (almost always pawns) on its second rank.
- Bishop and knight checkmate – fundamental checkmate with a minimum amount of material. It is notoriously difficult to achieve.
- Boden's Mate – checkmate pattern characterized by a king being mated by two bishops on criss-crossing diagonals, with possible flight squares blocked by friendly pieces.
- Fool's mate – shortest possible checkmate, on Black's second move. It is rare in practice.
- Scholar's mate – checkmate in as few as four moves by a player accomplished by a queen supported by a bishop (usually) in an attack on the f7 or f2 square. It is fairly common at the novice level.
- Smothered mate – checkmate accomplished by only a knight because the king's own pieces occupy squares to which it would be able to escape.

==== Defensive tactics ====
- Artificial castling (also known as "castling by hand") – taking several moves to get the king to the position it would be in if castling could have been done.
- Block (blocking an attack) – interposing a piece between another piece and its attacker. When the piece being attacked is the king, this is blocking a check.
- Blockade – to block a passed pawn with a piece.
- Desperado – piece that seems determined to give itself up, typically either (1) to sell itself as dearly as possible in a situation where both sides have hanging pieces or (2) to bring about stalemate if it is captured (or in some instances, to force a draw by threefold repetition if it is not captured).
- Luft – German for "air", meaning squares available for the king to escape an attack, typically through a fortress.
- X-ray defense – indirect defense of a piece through another piece.

===== Possible responses to an attack =====
- Capture the attacking piece
- Move the attacked piece
- Block – interpose another piece in between the two
- Guard the attacked piece and permit an exchange
- Pin the attacking piece so the capture becomes illegal or unprofitable
- Use a zwischenzug
- Create a counter-threat

=== Chess strategy ===
- Corresponding squares – usually used as a tool in king and pawn endgames, a pair of corresponding squares are such that if one king is on one of them, the opposing king needs to be on the other.
- Fianchetto – moving the pawn in front of the knight and placing the bishop on that square.
- Permanent brain – thinking when it is the opponent's turn to move.
- Prophylaxis – move that prevents some tactical moves by the opponent.
- First-move advantage in chess – theory that White's having the first move gives him an advantage.

==== Schools of chess ====
School of chess – group of players that share common ideas about the strategy of the game. There have been several schools in the history of modern chess. Today there is less dependence on schools – players draw on many sources and play according to their personal style.

- Modenese Masters – school of chess thought based on teachings of 18th century Italian masters, it emphasized an attack on the opposing king.
- Hypermodernism – school of thought based on ideas of some early 20th century masters. Rather than occupying the center of the board with pawns in the opening, control the center by attacking it with knights and bishops from the side.

==== Game phases ====
1. Chess opening – first phase of the game, where pieces are developed before the main battle begins.
2. Chess middlegame – second phase of the game, usually where the main battle is. Many games end in the middlegame.
3. Chess endgame – third and final phase of the game, where there are only a few pieces left.

==== Chess openings ====
Chess opening – group of initial moves of a chess game. Recognized sequences of opening moves are referred to as openings as finished by White, or defenses as finished by Black, but opening is also used as the general term.

  - Fool's mate – also known as the Two-Move Checkmate, it is the quickest possible checkmate in chess. A prime example consists of the moves: 1.f3 e5 2.g4 Qh4#
  - Scholar's mate – checkmate achieved by the moves: 1.e4 e5 2.Qh5 Nc6 3.Bc4 Nf6? 4.Qxf7#. The moves might be played in a different order or in slight variation, but the basic idea is the same: the queen and bishop combine in a simple mating attack on f7 (or f2 if Black is performing the mate).
  - Smothered mate – checkmate delivered by a knight in which the mated king is unable to move because he is surrounded (or smothered) by his own pieces.
  - Back rank checkmate – checkmate delivered by a rook or queen along a back rank (that is, the row on which the pieces (not pawns) stand at the start of the game) in which the mated king is unable to move up the board because the king is blocked by friendly pieces (usually pawns) on the second rank (Burgess 2009:16).
  - Boden's mate – checkmating pattern in chess characterized by bishops on two criss-crossing diagonals (for example, bishops on a6 and f4 delivering mate to a king on c8), with possible flight squares for the king being occupied by friendly pieces. Most often the checkmated king has castled queenside, and is mated on c8 or c1.
  - Epaulette mate – checkmate where two parallel retreat squares for a checked king are occupied by his own pieces, preventing his escape. The most common Epaulette mate involves the king on his back rank, trapped between two rooks.
  - Légal's mate – chess opening trap, characterized by a queen sacrifice followed by checkmate with minor pieces if Black accepts the sacrifice. The trap is named after the French player Sire de Légal (1702–1792).
- Chess Informant
- Chess opening theory table
- Encyclopaedia of Chess Openings
- Gambit – sacrifice of material (usually a pawn) to gain a positional advantage (usually faster development of pieces)
- List of chess openings
  - List of chess openings named after people
  - List of chess openings named after places

===== e4 Openings =====
- King's Pawn Game – Games that start with White moving 1.e4.
  - Open Game – Games that start with 1.e4 followed by 1...e5 by Black.
  - Semi-Open Game – Games that start with 1.e4 followed by a move other than 1...e5 by Black.

====== King's Knight Openings ======
King's Knight Opening –

- Damiano Defense
- Elephant Gambit
- Evans Gambit
- Four Knights Game
- Giuoco Piano
- Greco Defense
- Gunderam Defense
- Halloween Gambit
- Hungarian Defense
- Inverted Hungarian Opening
- Irish Gambit
- Italian Gambit
- Italian Game
  - Italian Game, Blackburne Shilling Gambit
- Jerome Gambit
- Konstantinopolsky Opening
- Latvian Gambit
- Petrov's Defense
- Philidor Defense
- Ponziani Opening
- Rousseau Gambit
- Ruy Lopez
  - Ruy Lopez, Exchange Variation
- Scotch Game
- Three Knights Opening
- Two Knights Defense
  - Two Knights Defense, Fried Liver Attack

====== Sicilian Defense ======
Sicilian Defense –

- Chekhover Sicilian
- Sicilian Defense, Accelerated Dragon
- Sicilian Defense, Alapin Variation
- Sicilian Defense, Dragon Variation
- Sicilian Defense, Najdorf Variation
- Sicilian Defense, Scheveningen Variation
- Sicilian, Dragon, Yugoslav attack, 9.Bc4
- Smith–Morra Gambit
- Wing Gambit

====== Other e4 opening variations ======
- Alapin's Opening
- Alekhine's Defense
- Balogh Defense
- Bishop's Opening
- Bongcloud Attack
- Caro–Kann Defense
- Center Game
- Danish Gambit
- Falkbeer Countergambit
- Fischer Defense
- French Defense
- King's Gambit
- Centre Pawn Opening
- Modern Defense
- Napoleon Opening
- Nimzowitsch Defense
- Owen's Defense
- Pirc Defense
- Portuguese Opening
- Rice Gambit
- Scandinavian Defense
- St. George Defense
- Vienna Game
- Wayward Queen Attack

===== d4 Openings =====
- Queen's Pawn Game
- Closed Game
- Semi-Closed Game

====== Queen's Gambit Openings ======
- Queen's Gambit –
- Queen's Gambit Accepted
- Queen's Gambit Declined
- Albin Countergambit
- Austrian Defense
- Baltic Defense
- Cambridge Springs Defense
- Chigorin Defense
- Marshall Defense
- Semi-Slav Defense
- Slav Defense
- Tarrasch Defense

====== Indian Defense ======
Indian Defense –

- Black Knights' Tango
- Bogo-Indian Defense
- Budapest Gambit
- East Indian Defense
- Grünfeld Defense
  - Grünfeld Defense, Nadanian Variation
- King's Indian Defense
  - King's Indian Defense, Four Pawns Attack
- Neo-Indian Attack
- Nimzo-Indian Defense
- Old Indian Defense
- Queen's Indian Defense
- Torre Attack
- Trompowsky Attack

====== Other d4 opening variations ======
- Alapin–Diemer Gambit
- Benko Gambit
- Benoni Defense
- Blackmar–Diemer Gambit
- Blumenfeld Gambit
- Catalan Opening
- Diemer–Duhm Gambit
- Dutch Defense
- English Defense
- Englund Gambit
- Keres Defense
- London System
- Bogoljubov–Mikenas Defense
- Polish Defense
- Richter–Veresov Attack
- Staunton Gambit
- Wade Defense

===== Flank openings =====
- Benko's Opening
- Bird's Opening
- English Opening
- Flank opening
- Larsen's Opening
- Réti Opening
- Zukertort Opening
- Réti Opening, King's Indian Attack

===== Irregular Openings =====
- Amar Opening
- Anderssen's Opening
- Barnes Opening
- Clemenz Opening
- Desprez Opening
- Dunst Opening
- Durkin Opening
- Grob's Attack
- Irregular chess opening
- Mieses Opening
- Saragossa Opening
- Sokolsky Opening
- Van 't Kruijs Opening
- Ware Opening

===== Openings including a trap =====
- Fool's mate
- Scholar's mate
- Elephant Trap
- Halosar Trap
- Kieninger Trap
- Lasker Trap
- Légal Trap
- Magnus Smith Trap
- Marshall Trap
- Monticelli Trap
- Mortimer Trap
- Noah's Ark Trap
- Rubinstein Trap
- Siberian Trap
- Tarrasch Trap
- Würzburger Trap

==== Endgames ====
Endgame – phase of the game after the middlegame when there are few pieces left on the board

- Checkmate patterns – Patterns of checkmate that occur reasonably often.
- Chess endgame literature – Literature on chess endgames.
- Endgame maneuvers
  - Prokeš maneuver – maneuver from an endgame study that sometimes occurs in games.
- Endgame positions
  - Endgame study – A composed position with a goal of either winning or drawing
    - Réti endgame study – endgame study illustrate how a king can pursue two goals at the same time.
    - Saavedra position – endgame study in which a surprising underpromotion leads to a win.
  - Particular endgame situations
    - Bare king – situation in which one player has only the king left on the board.
    - Fortress – position in which a player with weaker material is able to keep the stronger side at bay and draw the game instead of lose it.
    - King and pawn versus king endgame – fundamental endgame with a king and pawn versus a king.
      - Key square – square that a player needs to occupy (usually by the king in a king and pawn endgame) to achieve some goal.
    - Opposite-colored bishops endgame – Endgames in which each side has one bishop and the bishops are on opposite colors of the board.
    - Opposition – When two kings face each other with one square in between (with generalizations).
    - Pawnless chess endgame – Endgames without pawns.
    - Queen and pawn versus queen endgame – difficult endgame with a queen and pawn versus a queen.
    - Queen versus pawn endgame – fundamental endgame with a queen versus an advanced pawn protected by its king.
    - Rook and bishop versus rook endgame – well-studied endgame with a rook and bishop versus a rook.
    - Rook and pawn versus rook endgame – fundamental and well-studied endgame with a rook and pawn versus a rook.
      - Lucena position – one of the most famous and important positions in chess endgame theory, where if the side with the pawn can reach this type of position, he can forcibly win the game.
      - Philidor position – if the side without the pawn reaches the Philidor Position, he will force a draw.
    - Two knights endgame – endgame with two knights versus a lone king cannot force checkmate, but they may be able to force a win if the defender has a pawn.
    - Wrong bishop – situation in some endgames where a player's bishop is on the wrong color of square to accomplish something, i.e. the result would be different if the bishop was on the other color.
    - Wrong rook pawn – an endgame situation very closely related to the wrong bishop, where having the other rook pawn would have a different result.
- Endgame principles
  - Tarrasch rule – guideline that rooks should usually be placed behind passed pawns – both its own pawns and the opponent's.
- Endgame tablebase – computer database of endgame positions giving optimal moves for both sides and the result of optimal moves (a win for one player or a draw).

== Venues (who and where to play) ==
- Chess club
- Correspondence chess
- List of Internet chess platforms

=== Competitive chess ===
- Chess around the world –
- Chess rating system – dynamic rating system based on a player's performance, with a higher number indicating a better player.
- Chess tournament – chess competition among several to many players.
  - World chess championship
  - Swiss-system tournament – A tournament format designed to handle a relatively large number of players playing a small number of rounds in a relatively short time. Each player is paired against a player with the same score, or as close a score as possible. Today this is usually done with software.
  - Round-robin tournament – A tournament format for a small to moderate number of players in which each player plays every other player. It may be lengthy, depending on the number of rounds played.
  - Knockout tournament – A tournament format of several stages in which players are paired off and half are eliminated in each stage.
  - Scheveningen system - A tournament format in which players are organized into two teams of equal size, each player from one team playing each player from the other team.
  - Internet Computer Chess Tournament – tournament for chess engines held over the Internet.
- Elo rating system – system for evaluating the strength of competitive chess players based on their results.
- FIDE World Rankings – list of the highest-rated players in the world.
- Simultaneous exhibition – demonstration in which one player plays against a large number of opponents simultaneously.

==== Titles ====
Chess title –

- Grandmaster – the highest title other than World Champion
- International Master – lower title than Grandmaster
- FIDE Master – lower title than International Master
- Candidate Master – Lower title than FIDE Master
- Chess expert – A title awarded by the United States Chess Federation to players of below master strength
- Woman Grandmaster – Available to women only, lower requirements than Grandmaster
- Woman International Master – Available to women only, lower requirements than International Master
- Woman FIDE Master – Available to women only, lower requirements than FIDE Master
- Woman Candidate Master – Available to women only, lower requirements than Candidate Master
- International Correspondence Chess Grandmaster – The highest title awarded by the International Correspondence Chess Federation
- FIDE titles – lifetime titles awarded by FIDE

=== Computer chess ===
Computer chess –

- Chess engine –
- Human–computer chess matches –
- Internet chess server –
- Chess software –

== History of chess ==
- Chaturanga
- Shatranj
- Russia
- Europe
- Modern competitive chess
- Birth of a sport (1850–1945)
- Post-war era (1945 and later)
- Romantic chess
- Café de la Régence
- Human–computer chess matches
  - Deep Blue (chess computer)
    - Deep Blue versus Garry Kasparov
      - Deep Blue – Kasparov, 1996, Game 1
      - Deep Blue – Kasparov, 1997, Game 6

=== Notable games ===
- Pre-1850
- 1850-1899
- 1900–1924
- 1925-1949
- 1950s
- 1960s
- 1970s
- 1980s
- 1990s
- 2000s
- 2010s
- 2020s

=== Timeline ===
- Early history
- 16th century
- 17th century
- 18th century
- 19th century
- 20th century
- 21st century

=== World Chess Championship ===
- Predecessor events (before 1886)
- Privately organized matches (1886–1946)
- FIDE World Championships (1948–1990)
- Split title (1993–2006)
- FIDE World Championships (2006–present)

==== Other world championships ====
- Women's World Chess Championship
- World Amateur Chess Championship
- World Championship of Chess Composition
- World Computer Chess Championship
- World Computer Speed Chess Championship
- Interregnum of World Chess Champions
- Interzonal
- World Junior Chess Championship
- World Senior Chess Championship
- World Chess Solving Championship
- World Team Chess Championship
- World Youth Chess Championship

== Science of chess ==
=== Psychology and chess ===
- Chess blindness –
- Chess as mental training –
- Chess therapy –

=== Chess programming ===
- Board representation –
- Chess engine –
- Minimax –
- Null-move heuristic –
- Portable Game Notation –
- Transposition table –
- Endgame tablebase –

=== Chess problems ===
Chess problem – also chess composition, a composed chess position requiring the reader to solve it, usually created for artistic effect rather than practical application.

- Chess composer – a creator of chess problems.
- Glossary of chess problems –
- Motif (chess composition) –
  - Rundlauf –
- Endgame study – or simply "study", White to move and win or draw. Mate and number of moves are not specified. Usually an endgame position, with varying degrees of realism or practical application.
- Orthodox chess problems – chess problems in which the standard rules of chess are observed, however unrealistic the position or unusual the stipulation may be.
  - Directmates – White to move first and checkmate Black within a specified number of moves against any defense. These are often referred to as "mate in n", where n is the number of moves within which mate must be delivered. In composing and solving competitions, directmates are further broken down into three classes:
    - Two-movers – White to move and checkmate Black in two moves against any defense.
    - Three-movers – White to move and checkmate Black in no more than three moves against any defense.
    - More-movers – White to move and checkmate Black in n moves against any defense, where n is some particular number greater than three.
  - Helpmates – Black to move first cooperates with White to get Black's own king mated in a specified number of moves.
  - Selfmates – White moves first and forces Black (in a specified number of moves) to checkmate White.
  - Retrograde analysis – this involves deducing from the current position what has previously taken place during the game, for example to determine whether castling or an en passant capture is legal, or simply to determine what the previous move was.
- Fairy chess – chess problems involving alterations to the standard rules of chess, such as different boards and different pieces, to express an idea or theme impossible in orthodox chess. See also the section on chess variants, below.
  - Reflexmates – form of selfmate with the added stipulation that each side must give mate if it is able to do so. (When this stipulation applies only to Black, it is a semi-reflexmate.)
  - Seriesmovers – one side makes a series of moves without reply to achieve a stipulated aim. Check may not be given except on the last move. A seriesmover may take various forms:
    - Seriesmate – directmate with White playing a series of moves without reply to checkmate Black.
    - Serieshelpmate – helpmate in which Black plays a series of moves without reply after which White plays one move to checkmate Black.
    - Seriesselfmate – selfmate in which White plays a series of moves leading to a position in which Black is forced to give mate.
    - Seriesreflexmate – reflexmate in which White plays a series of moves leading to a position in which Black can, and therefore must, give mate.
- Joke chess problem –
- Chess puzzle – a position often taken from an actual game, used as a tactical training tool

=== Chess theory ===
Chess theory –

- First-move advantage in chess –
- Chess opening theory table –
- Combinatorial game theory
- Solving chess –

== Chess in culture ==
- Chess aesthetics
- Chess in the arts
- Chess game collections
- Chess libraries
- Chess media
  - Chess in popular media
- Chess organizations
- Chess venues (who and where to play)
- Chess variants

== Chess media ==
- Chess columns in newspapers –
- Chess endgame literature –
- Chess libraries
- List of chess books
  - List of chess books (A–F)
  - List of chess books (G–L)
  - List of chess books (M–S)
  - List of chess books (T–Z)
- List of chess periodicals

=== Chess essays ===
- The Morals of Chess, by Benjamin Franklin

=== Chess video games ===
- Battle Chess
- Chessmaster
- Fritz

=== Chess websites ===
- ChessCafe.com – publishes endgame studies, book reviews and other articles related to chess on a weekly basis.
- Chessgames.com – Internet chess community with over 197,000 members. The site maintains a large database of chess games, where each game has its own discussion page for comments and analysis.
- Internet chess servers – websites that allow players to play each other online
  - Chess.com – commercial internet chess server, media organisation, and the flagship product of Chess.com as a conglomerate
  - FIDE Online Arena – Fédération internationale des échecs or World Chess Federation's (FIDE) commercial Internet chess server devoted to chess playing and related activities.
  - Free Internet Chess Server – volunteer-run Internet chess server. It was organized as a free alternative to the Internet Chess Club (ICC), after that site began charging for membership.
  - Internet Chess Club – commercial Internet chess server devoted to the play and discussion of chess and chess variants.
  - Lichess – free and open source chess server and registered non-profit association.
  - Playchess – commercial Internet chess server edited by ChessBase devoted to the play and discussion of chess and chess variants.
- SchemingMind – privately owned international correspondence chess club founded in 2002. Most games and tournaments are played on a correspondence chess server owned by the club for this purpose.
- The Week in Chess – one of the first, if not the first, Internet-based chess news services.

=== Chess in popular media ===
- Chess in the arts and literature
  - Chess in early literature

==== Chess-themed movies ====
- Knight Moves
- Pawn Sacrifice
- Searching for Bobby Fischer

== Chess organizations ==
- FIDE
- Professional Chess Association

== Chess players ==
- Women in chess

=== Top chess players ===
- Statistical methods
- Moves played compared with computer choices
- Subjective lists
- World Champions by world title reigns

=== Lists of chess players ===
- Chess prodigy
  - Youngest to defeat a grandmaster
  - List of youngest grandmasters
- List of amateur chess players
- List of chess families
- List of chess grandmasters
- List of chess players

== Chess variants ==
- Fairy chess piece – pieces used in chess variants other than the usual pieces.

=== Variants with a different starting position ===
- Displacement chess – starting position is slightly altered to negate players' knowledge of openings.
- Chess960 – The starting position of pieces on the 1st and 8th ranks are random, White and Black starting positions must be mirrored and the king must start between rooks.
- Transcendental Chess – Like Chess960 but with no castling, starting positions are not necessarily mirrored and bishops must start in opposite color squares.

=== Variants with different forces ===
- Chess handicap – Giving an advantage to a weaker player to allow equal chances of winning.
- Dunsany's Chess – Black starts just as in traditional chess, while White starts with only 32 pawns. Black wins by taking all the pawns while avoiding stalemate, White wins by checkmating the black king.

=== Variants with a different board ===
- Minichess – board has less squares, e.g. 3×3, 5×5, 5×6, etc.
- Los Alamos chess – 6×6 variant without bishops.
- Grid chess – 8×8 board with a 4×4 grid, a piece must cross at least one grid line at each move.
- Cylinder chess – played on a cylinder, which results in joining the right and left sides of the board.
- Circular chess – variant played on a circular board.
- Alice Chess – Played with two boards. One starts with no pieces, the other starts with standard pieces. Pieces are transferred to the same square on the other board with each move.
- Hexagonal chess – any of various variants played on a hexagonal board or board with hexagonal cells.
- Three-dimensional chess – Variants with multiple boards at different levels, resulting in gameplay in three dimensions.
  - Star Trek Tri-Dimensional Chess
- Cubic Chess – pieces are replaced by cubes, with the piece figures on their sides, making easier to shift the piece types under special rules of promotion.
- Flying chess – played with two boards, one of which represents the upper level, the other the lower. Only some pieces are allowed to move on the upper level.
- Dragonchess – created by Gary Gygax, co-creator of the famed role-playing game Dungeons & Dragons, the pieces are inspired on characters and monsters from the fantasy RPG.

=== Variants with unusual rules ===
- Losing chess – objective of each player is to lose all their pieces instead of checkmating the enemy king. Capturing, as in checkers, is compulsory.
- Atomic chess – whenever a capture occurs, the surrounding pieces are also captured, resembling the idea of an explosion.
- Three checks chess – a player wins by checking the opponent king three times.
- Extinction chess – the objective is to capture all of a particular type of piece of the opponent (e.g., both knights, all pawns, or the queen).
- Crazyhouse – a captured piece can be introduced back to the board by the player who captured it, as a piece of his own.
- Knight relay chess – pieces defended by a knight may move as a knight. Knights cannot capture or be captured.
- Andernach chess – after a capture, the capturing piece changes its color.
- Checkless chess – any move resulting in check is not allowed, except checkmate.
- Circe chess – captured pieces instantly return to their starting positions.
- Legan chess – starting positions of pieces are concentrated on opposite corners of the board. Pawn movement becomes diagonal and capturing orthogonal.
- Madrasi chess – whenever a piece is attacked by an enemy piece of the same type, it cannot move.
- Monochromatic chess – a piece may only move to a square of the same color as the one it occupies. Knights follow special rules for movement.
- Patrol chess – capturing and checking are not allowed unless the capturing or checking piece is guarded by a friendly piece.
- PlunderChess – capturing pieces gain a limited ability to move as the captured piece.

=== Variants with incomplete information and elements of chance ===
- Kriegspiel – a player can see his own pieces, but not the enemy pieces.
- Dark chess – a player can only see the squares occupied by his own pieces and squares his pieces could move to.
- Penultima – spectators of the game secretly decide the moving and capturing rules for each piece, which the players gradually find out during the game.
- Dice chess – players roll dice before each move to determine which piece types may be moved.
- Knightmare Chess – fantasy variant published by Steve Jackson Games, including cards that change aspects of the game.

=== Multimove variants ===
- Marseillais chess – each player moves twice per turn. If the first move gives check, the player doesn't make the second move that turn.
- Progressive chess – the number of moves played each turn increases progressively. White starts with one move, then Black plays two moves, then White plays 3 moves, etc.
- Avalanche chess – after each move, it is obligatory for the player to move an opponent pawn one square towards himself.
- Monster chess – Black plays as in traditional chess, but White has only one king and four pawns, and moves twice a turn.
- Kung-fu chess – a variant with no turns, pieces can be moved freely, each piece having its own delay time between two moves. A real-time strategy game, played mostly online.

=== Multiplayer variants ===
- Bughouse chess – variant with four players and two boards, 2 vs 2, captured pieces by a player are transferred to his partner, who may introduce them to his board.
- Three-player chess – specially connected three-sided board for three players.
- Four-player chess – extended cross-shaped board for four players.
- Forchess – four player variant inside a regular board, with specific initial configuration.
- Djambi – 9×9 variant for four players with special pieces and rules.
- Bosworth – four player variant on a 6×6 board, pieces are put into play gradually as the game progresses.
- Enochian chess – four player variant with complex rules created by William Wynn Westcott, one of the three founders of the Hermetic Order of the Golden Dawn.

=== Variants with unusual pieces ===
- Fairy chess piece
- Hippogonal
- Grasshopper
- Grasshopper chess
- Berolina chess
- Maharajah and the Sepoys
- Omega Chess
- Stealth Chess
- Pocket Mutation Chess
- Baroque chess
- Butterfly chess
- Chess with different armies
- Duell
- Gess
- Wildebeest Chess

==== Variants with bishop+knight and rook+knight compounds ====
- Seirawan chess
- Janus Chess
- Capablanca Chess
- Capablanca Random Chess
- Embassy Chess
- Modern chess
- Grand Chess

=== Games inspired by chess ===
- Arimaa
- Icehouse pieces
- Martian chess

=== Historical variants ===
- History of chess
- Cox–Forbes theory
- Liubo
- Chaturanga
- Chaturaji
- Shatranj
- Abu Bakr bin Yahya al-Suli
- Tamerlane chess
- Hiashatar
- Senterej
- Lewis chessmen

=== Xiangqi and variants ===
- Xiangqi
- Encyclopedia of Chinese Chess Openings
- Banqi

=== Shogi and variants ===
- Shogi
- Shogi strategy and tactics
- History of shogi
- Meijin
- Ryu-oh
- Computer shogi
- Shogi variant
- Micro shogi
- Minishogi
- Kyoto shogi
- Judkins shogi
- Whale shogi
- Tori shogi
- Yari shogi
- Heian shogi
- Sho shogi
- Cannon shogi
- Hasami shogi
- Annan shogi
- Unashogi
- Wa shogi
- Chu shogi
- Heian dai shogi
- Akuro
- Dai shogi
- Tenjiku shogi
- Dai dai shogi
- Maka dai dai shogi
- Ko shogi
- Tai shogi
- Taikyoku shogi
- Sannin shogi
- Yonin shogi
- Edo-era shogi sources

=== Other national variants ===
- Janggi
- Makruk
- Sittuyin

=== Chess combined with other sports and pastimes ===
- Chess boxing
- Human chess
- Shot chess
- Strip chess

=== Chess variants software ===
- ChessV
- Fairy-Max

=== Fictional variants ===
- Wizard's chess

== See also ==
- Glossary of chess
  - Glossary of chess problems
- Hippogonal
- Morphy number
