= Touch-move rule =

Chess rule requiring a player to move or capture a piece deliberately touched

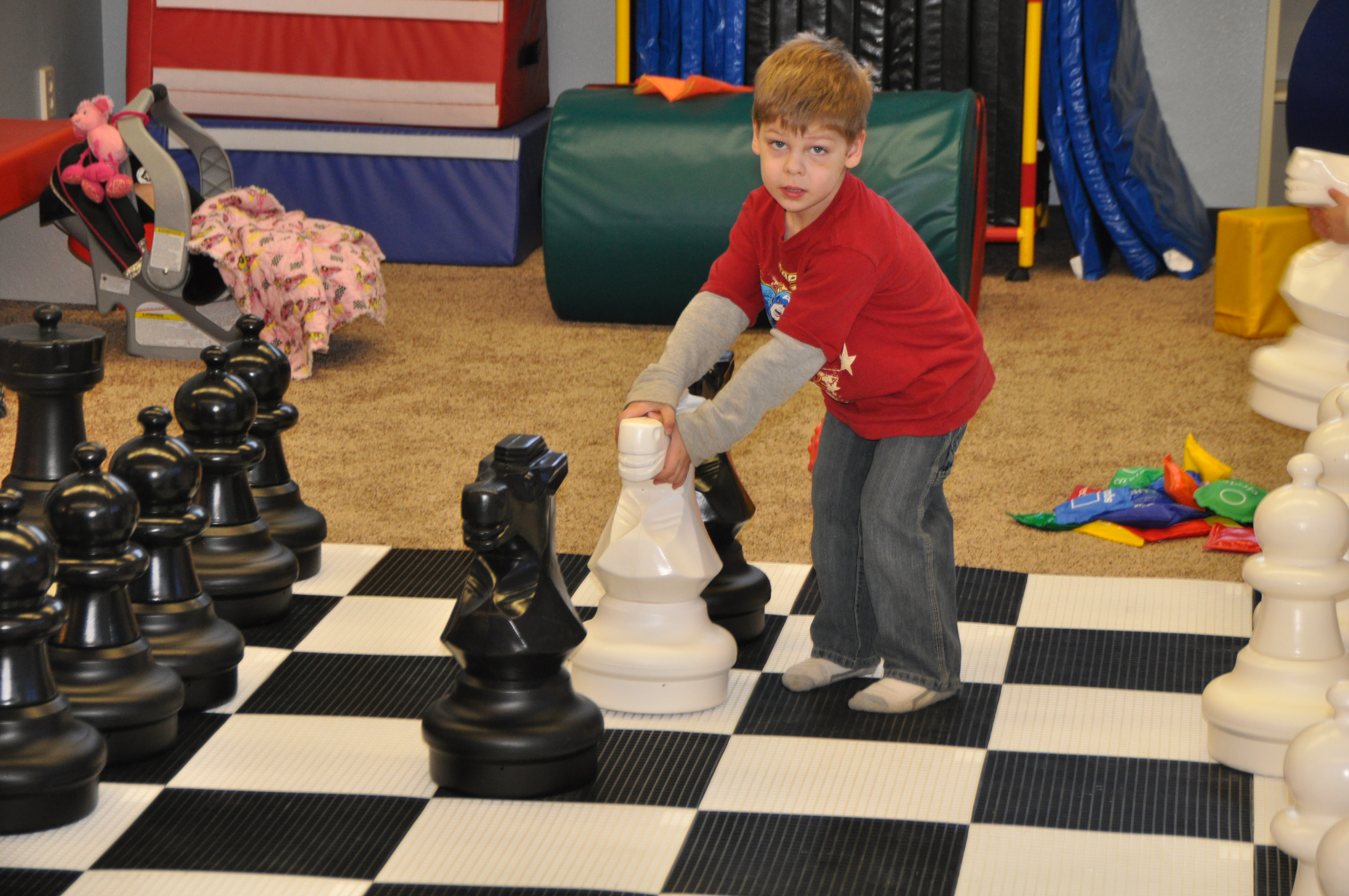
Touching a piece can incur consequences in competitive chess, but typically not in informal play.

The touch-move rule in chess specifies that a player, having the move, who deliberately touches a piece (Note: In the context of the rules of chess, the term "piece" refers to all six piece types, including pawns.) on the board must move or capture that piece if it is legal to do so. If it is the player's piece that was touched, it must be moved if the piece has a legal move. If the opponent's piece was touched, it must be captured if possible. If the touched piece cannot be legally moved or captured, there is no penalty. This is a rule of chess that is enforced in all formal over-the-board competitions.

A player claiming a touch-move violation must do so before themselves touching a piece. (Note: Article 4.8 in FIDE Laws of Chess) A player who wants to adjust a piece on its square without being required to move it can announce the French j'adoube ("I adjust") before touching the piece. While j'adoube is internationally understood, a local language equivalent such as "adjusting" is usually acceptable. A player may not touch the pieces on the board during the opponent's turn.

There is a separate rule that a player who lets go of a piece after making a legal move cannot retract the move.

Online chess often does not use the touch rule, letting players "pick up" a piece and then bring it back to the original square before selecting a different piece, and also allowing players to premove pieces while waiting for the opponent to move. A few sites such as the USCF and FIDE online chess websites enforce touch-move by disallowing any other pieces to be played after picking up one. In the case that the piece cannot move, the player is free to choose another piece.

== Details ==
A player having the move who deliberately touches one or more of their own pieces must move the first touched piece that can be legally moved. So long as the hand has not left the piece on a new square, the piece can be placed on any accessible square. Accidentally touching a piece (e.g., brushing against it while reaching for another piece) or adjusting a piece does not count as a deliberate touch.

A player who touches an opposing piece must capture it if the piece can be captured. A player who touches one of the player's own pieces and an opponent's piece must make that capture if it is a legal move. Otherwise, the first of the touched pieces must be moved or captured. If it cannot be determined whether the player's piece or the opponent's piece was touched first, it is assumed that the player's piece was touched first. If a player touches more than one piece, the player must move or capture the first piece that can be legally moved or captured.

Castling is a king move, so the king must be touched first. If the rook is touched first instead, a rook move must be made. (Note: If castling is legal, moving the rook next to the king is indeed a valid rook move, so releasing the rook next to the king completes a move and standard rules of chess disallow moving the king to the other side of the rook afterwards. On the other hand, moving a king by two squares towards a rook is never a complete move in itself, and the rook must be moved over the king to complete the castling move if legal.) (Note: One variation in Article 10.I.2 of the United States Chess Federation's Official Rules of Chess allows the rook to be touched first; therefore if castling on that side is illegal, a move must be made with the touched rook. This variation is announced in advance. The FIDE Laws of Chess do not permit this.) If the player touches a rook at the same time as touching the king, the player must castle with that rook if it is legal to do so. If the player completes a two-square king move without touching a rook, the player must move the correct rook accordingly if castling on that side is legal. Otherwise, the move must be withdrawn and another king move made. This may include castling on the other side. If the player touches both pieces in attempting to castle illegally, the king must be moved if possible, but even if there is no legal king move, there is no requirement to move the rook.

When a pawn is moved to its eighth rank, once the player releases the pawn, a different move of the pawn can no longer be substituted. The move is not complete, however, until the promoted piece is released on that square.

=== Examples ===
Fischer vs Donner, 1966

Position: c8 black rook, g8 black king, f7 black pawn, g7 black pawn, h7 black pawn, a6 black pawn, f5 black queen, c4 white bishop, d4 white pawn, a3 black bishop, g3 white pawn, a2 white pawn, c2 white rook, f2 white pawn, h2 white pawn, f1 white queen, g1 white king

Black just moved 29...Qg5–f5.

In the diagram, from a game between future world champion Bobby Fischer and Jan Hein Donner, White had a probably winning advantage; Black had just moved 29...Qg5–f5 and White fell for a swindle. Fischer touched his bishop, intending to move 30.Bd3, which seems like a natural move, but then realized that Black could play 30...Rxc2, and after 31.Bxf5 Rc1 32.Qxc1 Bxc1, the game would be a draw, because of the opposite-coloured bishops endgame. After touching the bishop, he realized that 30.Bd3 was a bad move, but since he was obligated to move the bishop, and other bishop moves were even worse, after several seconds he played 30.Bd3. The queens and rooks were exchanged (as above) and a draw by agreement was reached after the 34th move. Had Fischer won the game, he would have tied with Boris Spassky for first place in the 1966 Piatigorsky Cup tournament.

Unzicker vs Fischer, 1960

Position: a8 black rook, c8 black bishop, f8 black rook, g8 black king, c7 black queen, e7 black bishop, f7 black pawn, g7 black pawn, h7 black pawn, a6 black pawn, c6 black pawn, d6 black pawn, e6 black pawn, f6 black knight, g5 white bishop, e4 white pawn, f4 white pawn, c3 white knight, d3 white bishop, g3 white queen, a2 white pawn, b2 white pawn, c2 white pawn, g2 white pawn, h2 white pawn, c1 white king, d1 white rook, h1 white rook

Fischer now touched his h-pawn, compelling him to play 12...h6?? or 12...h5??

The touch-move rule produced an even more disastrous result for Fischer in his game as Black against Wolfgang Unzicker at Buenos Aires 1960. In the position diagrammed, Fischer touched his h-pawn, intending to play 12...h6. He then realized that White could simply play 13.Bxh6, since 13...gxh6 would be illegal due to the pin on the g-file by White's queen. Having touched his h-pawn, the touch-move rule required Fischer to play either 12...h6?? or 12...h5??, an almost equally bad move that fatally weakens Black's kingside. Fischer accordingly played 12...h5?? and resigned just ten moves later—his shortest loss ever in a serious game.

Karpov vs Chernin, 1992

Position: e8 white queen, b7 black rook, c7 black king, f7 white king, g5 white rook, h5 black pawn, e4 white pawn, g4 black pawn

Black moved 53...Kd6+, White touched his queen.

In this position in a rapid game between former world champion Anatoly Karpov and Alexander Chernin in Tilburg in 1992, White had just promoted a pawn to a queen on the e8-square. Black made the discovered check 53...Kd6+. Karpov, with very little time remaining, did not see that he was in check and played the illegal move 54.Qe6+. The arbiter required Karpov to play a legal move with his queen instead (since he touched it), and he selected 54.Qe7+?? (54.Qd7+ Rxd7+ 55.Kg6 would still have drawn.) After 54...Rxe7+, Karpov lost the game.

Tarrasch vs Alapin, 1889

Position: a8 black rook, b8 black knight, c8 black bishop, d8 black queen, e8 black king, f8 black bishop, h8 black rook, a7 black pawn, b7 black pawn, c7 black pawn, f7 black pawn, g7 black pawn, h7 black pawn, d6 black pawn, e4 black knight, d3 white pawn, f3 white knight, a2 white pawn, b2 white pawn, c2 white pawn, f2 white pawn, g2 white pawn, h2 white pawn, a1 white rook, b1 white knight, c1 white bishop, d1 white queen, e1 white king, f1 white bishop, h1 white rook

Black touched his king's bishop, mistakenly thinking White had played 5.d2–d4.

In the 1889 game between Siegbert Tarrasch and Semyon Alapin at Breslau, Alapin was expecting 5.d4, the normal move after 1.e4 e5 2.Nf3 Nf6 3.Nxe5 d6 4.Nf3 Nxe4 in Petrov's Defence. But by the time he looked at the position he had already touched his king's bishop, intending 5...Be7 in reply to 5.d4, not noticing that White actually played 5.d3 attacking his knight. Now compelled to move the bishop, he would lose the knight without compensation, so he resigned immediately.

== Adjusting pieces ==
If a player wishes to adjust one or more pieces on their squares without being required to move them, the player may announce j'adoube ([ʒaˈdub], French for "I adjust"), or words to that effect in other languages. This indicates that the player intends only incidental contact with a piece (for example, to center it on its square), not to make a move. Under the FIDE Laws of Chess, a player who wishes to adjust a piece must first indicate that intention; otherwise, deliberate contact with a piece is generally treated as intent to move or capture (with accidental contact excluded).

The phrase is used to warn the opponent that the player is about to touch a piece on the board without intending to make a move. Only a player who has the move may adjust pieces, and the opponent must be present.

=== Example of misuse ===
There have been occasions in chess history when a player has uttered j'adoube suspiciously late. It is possible a late announcement of an adjustment can be used after starting to make a losing move in order to retract it, thus avoiding the touch-move rule. Such behaviour, when intentionally used for a retraction, is regarded as cheating. The Yugoslav grandmaster Milan Matulović was nicknamed "J'adoubovic" after such an incident.

== History ==
Lindemann vs Echtermeyer, 1893

Position: a8 black rook, b8 black knight, c8 black bishop, e8 black king, f8 black bishop, g8 black knight, h8 black rook, a7 black pawn, b7 black pawn, c7 black pawn, e7 black pawn, f7 black pawn, g7 black pawn, h7 black pawn, d5 black queen, a2 white pawn, b2 white pawn, c2 white pawn, d2 white pawn, f2 white pawn, g2 white pawn, h2 white pawn, a1 white rook, b1 white knight, c1 white bishop, d1 white queen, e1 white king, f1 white bishop, g1 white knight, h1 white rook

White, having made an illegal move, was compelled to play instead 3.Ke2?? here, allowing 3...Qe4#.

The touch-move rule has existed for centuries. In the Middle Ages, strict rules were considered necessary because chess was played for stakes. Luis Ramirez de Lucena gave the rule in his 1497 book Repetición de amores y arte de ajedrez. Benjamin Franklin referred to it in his 1786 essay "The Morals of Chess". (Note: Franklin wrote in his essay, first published in the Columbian Magazine in Philadelphia, that one of the "laws of the game" was that "if you touch a piece, you must move it somewhere; if you set it down, you must let it stand.") At one time, the rule also required the player who played an illegal move to move the king. In the first half of the nineteenth century, rule XIII of the London Chess Club provided:

If a player make a false move, i.e., play a Piece or Pawn to any square to which it cannot legally be moved, his adversary has the choice of three penalties; viz., 1st, of compelling him to let the Piece or Pawn remain on the square to which he played it; 2nd, to move correctly to another square; 3rd, to replace the Piece or Pawn and move his King.

While this rule existed, it occasionally led to tragicomedies such as in the 1893 game between Lindemann and Echtermeyer, at Kiel. In that game, after 1.e4 d5 2.exd5 Qxd5 White, probably intending the usual 3.Nc3, instead placed his queen's bishop on c3. Since that move was illegal, White was compelled to instead move his king. After the forced 3.Ke2??, Black gave checkmate with 3...Qe4#.

In England, the 1862 laws of the British Chess Association rejected the above rule. The association's law VII provided instead that if a player made an illegal move, "he must, at the choice of the opponent, and according to the case, either move his own man legally, capture the man legally, or move any other man legally moveable." (Note: Steinitz, unlike Gossip and Lipschütz, did not give a specific date for the Laws of Chess that he set forth, but wrote, "We approve in the main of the Code of Laws of the British Chess Association, which has been adopted in many Chess Congresses.") The German chess master Siegbert Tarrasch wrote in The Game of Chess (originally published in 1931 as Das Schachspiel) that the former rule requiring a player who made an illegal move to move the king had only been changed a few years earlier. (Note: Tarrasch wrote, "If a player makes a move not permitted by the rules of the game or if he touches either an enemy man which cannot be taken or one of his own which cannot be moved then until recently there was a rule that as a penalty he must move his King (but not castle). ... This rule was altered a few years ago—and rightly so.")

== Unusual scenarios ==
The Chess960 variant (also known as Fischer Random Chess) has custom castling rules wherein the king and the rook end up where they would be in a normal chess game even if they start on different squares because of the randomized start positions. It is thus possible for the king or rook to not move while castling, or for the destination square for the king to already be occupied by the rook, yet by convention touch-move requires that the king be touched and moved first. Players are expected to use only a single hand, so picking up both simultaneously is not an option. A dispute arose at the FIDE World Fischer Random Chess Championship 2019 in a speed chess game between Ian Nepomniachtchi and Wesley So. Nepomniachtchi attempted to castle, but he first moved the rook out of the way for his king to take the rook's former square. The arbiter initially required Nepomniachtchi to make a rook move as a result of touching the rook first rather than castling. This was appealed, and the appeals committee overturned the original ruling; the game was replayed.

== See also ==
- Rules of chess
- Chu shogi, a shogi variant with a stricter counterpart to this rule
