= Legan =

Legan may refer to:

== Places ==
- Legan, islet near Kwajalein Atoll
- Legan, Ballyloughloe, a townland in Ballyloughloe civil parish, barony of Clonlonan, County Westmeath, Ireland
- Legan, County Longford, Ireland, village

== Others ==
- Legan chess, variant of chess invented in 1913 by L. Legan

== People with the surname Legan ==
- Primož Legan (b. 1983) Slovenian motorcycle speedway rider
- Mark Jordan Legan American television producer, writer and radio personality
- Santino William Legan (2000/2001 – 2019), gunman at Gilroy Garlic Festival shooting in 2019
