= List of chess traps =

In chess, a trap is a move that tempts the opponent to play a bad move, but not necessarily. Traps are common in all phases of the game; in the opening, some traps have occurred often enough that they have acquired names. If the opponent sees through the trap, it can backfire.

== List of chess traps ==
Ordered by chess opening:

- Albin Countergambit: Lasker Trap
- Blackmar–Diemer Gambit: Halosar Trap
- Bogo-Indian Defence: Monticelli Trap
- Budapest Gambit: Kieninger Trap
- Englund Gambit Trap
- Italian Game: Blackburne Shilling Gambit
- Petrov's Defence: Marshall Trap
- Philidor Defence: Légal Trap
- Queen's Gambit Declined:
  - Elephant Trap
  - Rubinstein Trap
- Ruy Lopez:
  - Mortimer Trap
  - Noah's Ark Trap
  - Tarrasch Trap
  - Fishing Pole Trap
- Sicilian Defence:
  - Magnus Smith Trap
  - Siberian Trap
- Vienna Gambit: Würzburger Trap

== See also ==
- Gambit
- Fool's mate
- Scholar's mate
- Swindle (chess)
