= List of amateur chess players =

Several amateur chess players have been noted in other endeavors, while their lives and work have been influenced by the game of chess.

Woody Allen
The film comedian and occasional player taught his adopted son Moses Farrow the game; authored a comical epistolary short story titled "The Gossage-Vardebedian Papers" involving a chess game played via mail. The two protagonists disagree on the correct position due to alleged lost exchange. Both eventually claim victory.
Humphrey Bogart
Prior to his acting career, Bogart hustled players for dimes and quarters, playing in New York parks and at Coney Island. Frank Kelly Rich, on Drunkard.com, writes that “When his meager wages were exhausted, he’d play chess against all comers in arcades for a dollar a match (he was a brilliant player) to fund his outings.” Mike Doyle, on Chess.com, writes that “Before he made any money from acting, he would hustle players for dimes and quarters, playing in New York parks and at Coney Island.” The chess scenes in Casablanca had not been in the original script, but were put in at his insistence. A chess position from one of his correspondence games appears in the movie, although the image is blurred. He achieved a draw in a simultaneous exhibition given in 1955 at Beverly Hills by the famous chess Grandmaster Samuel Reshevsky and also played against George Koltanowski in San Francisco in 1952 (Koltanowski played blindfolded but still won in 41 moves). Bogart was a United States Chess Federation tournament director and active in the California State Chess Association, and a frequent visitor to the Hollywood chess club. The cover of the June–July 1945 issue of Chess Review showed Bogart playing with Charles Boyer, as Lauren Bacall (who also played) looks on. In June 1945, in an interview in the magazine Silver Screen, when asked what things in life mattered most to him, he replied that chess was one of his main interests. He added that he played chess almost daily, especially between film shootings. Bogart remained an avid player throughout his life.
Lewis Carroll
The mathematician and fantasy author used chess as a central device in his 1871 book Through the Looking Glass. Most of the characters are chess pieces participating in a game on a giant board in which each square is about one square mile in size. Carroll also composed occasional chess problems.
Charlie Chaplin
The silent screen comedian devoted two pages of his autobiography to playing chess, noting his participation as one of twenty Hollywood stars to play in a simultaneous exhibition against Sammy Reshevsky (then nine years old) at the Los Angeles Athletic Club in June 1921.
Marcel Duchamp
Best known as an artist, Duchamp later abandoned his artistic career in favor of chess. Prior to that time, his 1911 Portrait of Chess Players (French: portrait de joueurs d'echecs) contained Cubist overlapping frames and multiple perspectives of his two brothers playing chess. He dropped painting in 1923, concentrating on chess and his strength became near master class. Duchamp can be seen, very briefly, playing chess with Man Ray in the 1924 short film Entr'acte by René Clair. He designed the 1925 Poster for the Third French Chess Championship, and later became a chess journalist, writing weekly newspaper columns. While his contemporaries were achieving spectacular success with art, Duchamp observed, "I am still a victim of chess. It has all the beauty of art – and much more. It cannot be commercialized. Chess is much purer than art in its social position." Later he said "while not all artists are chess players, all chess players are artists." Duchamp composed an enigmatic endgame chess problem in 1943, included in the announcement for Julian Lev's gallery exhibition "Through the Big End of the Opera Glass". It was printed on translucent paper with the faint inscription: "White to play and win". Grandmasters and endgame specialists have since grappled with the problem with most concluding that there is no solution. In 1968, Duchamp and John Cage appeared together at a concert titled "Reunion", playing a game of chess and composing aleatoric music by triggering a series of photoelectric cells underneath the chess board.
Leonhard Euler
The mathematician described an 8x8 square with each square containing one of the numbers from 1 through 64. This square was simultaneously a semimagic square (all the rows and columns, but not the diagonals, add up to the same sum) and a solution to the Knight's tour problem according to which all 64 of the squares of the chess board must be traversed in a series of knight's moves. (Note: The square may be viewed here, archived from the original.)
Benjamin Franklin
The American Founding Father and scientific experimenter began playing circa 1733, making him the first player known by name in the American colonies. An avid player, his essay on "The Morals of Chess" in Columbian Magazine, in December 1786 is the second known writing on chess in America and has been widely reprinted and translated. He and a friend also used chess as a means of learning the Italian language the pair were studying; the winner of each game had the right to assign a task, such as parts of the Italian grammar to be learned by heart, to be performed by the loser before their next meeting. Franklin was posthumously inducted into the U.S. Chess Hall of Fame in 1999.
Stephen Fry
The actor and novelist is a player and also includes a philosophical conversation about chess in his 2000 novel The Stars' Tennis Balls.
John Paul II
The former pope was a chess enthusiast. While acting as a vicar for University students in Kraków, Poland, the young priest, then known as Karol Wojtyla, frequently played with other students. However, chess problems attributed to him have generally proved to be hoaxes.
Stanley Kubrick
The film director was an avid player. As a young man in New York, he hustled games in the streets for money. Chess plays a role in the plot of two of his films: Lolita (1962) and 2001: A Space Odyssey (1968). In Lolita, Professor Humbert plays chess with Lolita's mother, Charlotte Haze, and announces he will "take her queen" while he has designs on her daughter who is kissing him goodnight as he speaks. This scene is not in the source novel. In 2001: A Space Odyssey, the super-computer HAL 9000 defeats astronaut Frank Poole in a game.
Heath Ledger
The film actor had a lifelong obsession with chess. In his youth, he competed in tournaments in his native Australia, even winning one in Perth. As an adult he was often spotted in Washington Square Park playing with other chess enthusiasts. Also at the time of his death, Ledger was preparing to direct a film adaptation of The Queen's Gambit, which is about a chess prodigy.
Vladimir Lenin
The Russian communist revolutionary held a fascination with chess for most of his life, leading him to meet well-known chess players of his time and referencing the board game in political speeches. There are dozens of paintings and graphics on this subject (most created by the USSR from the 1930s through the 1970s), as well as photographs that capture Lenin playing chess. Lenin's love for the game is also widely represented in memoirs of those familiar with him. Lenin's enthusiasm for chess was later used by the USSR to popularize the game between the 1920s and 1980s. In 2010, art historians connected certain auctioned rarities with Lenin and his chess lessons.
Vladimir Nabokov
Nabokov was a composer of chess problems and wove chess themes into many of his novels. Chess plays a major role in his novel The Defense, about a young chess prodigy who has a mental breakdown. Nabokov published 18 chess problems in his anthology Poems and Problems, and composed three poems in sonnet form about chess in the Russian émigré journal Rul’ in Berlin in November 1924. His memoir Speak, Memory compares the composition of chess problems to the composition of poetry. In his foreword to The Defense, he calls the creation of surprise twists in a novel "chess effects". A 1979 study in Yale French Studies explores links between Nabokov's chess problems and his novels, as does Janet Gezari's 1971 Ph.D. thesis "Game Fiction: The World of Play and the Novels of Vladimir Nabokov", later issued as a book titled Vladimir Nabokov: Chess Problems and the Novel.
Napoleon
Napoleon is perhaps the best known victim of the chess hoax known as the Mechanical Turk, an apparently mechanical chess-playing machine animated by a player hiding inside. The emperor was visiting Schönbrunn Palace in Vienna in 1809 and challenged the Turk. In a surprise move, he took the first turn instead of deferring to the Turk, as was usual; the device's then owner, Mälzel, allowed the game to continue. Shortly thereafter, Napoleon attempted an illegal move. The Turk simply returned the piece to its original spot and continued the game, as was its habit. Napoleon attempted the same move a second time; the Turk removed the piece from the board entirely and took its turn. When Napoleon persisted a third time, the Turk swept its arm and knocked all the pieces off the board. Napoleon was reportedly amused, then played a proper game, completing nineteen moves before tipping over his king in surrender.
Edgar Allan Poe
Though it is unknown how avidly Poe played chess, a knowledge of the game pervaded an essay and two of his stories. The essay was an important speculation on the secret of the hoax chess-playing automaton the Mechanical Turk, titled "Maelzel's Chess Player". Poe also published a short story in which the Turk figures entitled "Von Kempelen and His Discovery". The Turk was eventually purchased by Poe's personal physician, John Kearsley Mitchell. Poe's short story "The Murders in the Rue Morgue" contains a discussion of the psychology of chess, arguing that much greater powers of shrewdness are required to play checkers than chess, whereas the latter only requires intense concentration. He also asserts that proficiency in the game of whist is an indicator of high general capacity for achievement, but not proficiency in chess.
Serge Prokofiev
The Russian composer related in his autobiography that he had learned to play chess at age seven and it remained a lifelong passion. He became friends with various grandmasters and frequented the chess club in St. Petersburg, often spending hours on simultaneous games. According to his personal diary, he once beat the future World Chess Champion, José Raúl Capablanca in a simultaneous exhibition.
Howard Stern
The radio personality regularly plays on an Internet Chess Club site. His rating is above 1600.
Leo Tolstoy
The Russian novelist learned to play chess at a young age and late in life played chess frequently with his biographer Aylmer Maude writing "He had no book-knowledge of it, but had played much and was alert and ingenious." Another frequent chess companion of Tolstoy's was Prince Leonid Urusov.
Alan Turing
The computer scientist, long considered to be a founder of the field of artificial intelligence, considered chess playing to be the ideal starting point for researching the field of machine intelligence. He is also the inventor of Turochamp, the first chess program.
John Wayne
The Western actor played chess frequently on movie sets according to both biographers Ronald L. Davis and Herb Fagan. His onscreen characters play chess in the films McLintock! and 3 Godfathers. Roger Ebert recalls that on the set of Chisum, "we were playing a chess game, both of us bending over the board on an upended apple crate. Wayne, slouched in his old stitched leather director's chair, had a crowd of kibitzers: wranglers, extras, old cronies, drinking buddies, a couple of Mexican stuntmen. He studied the board, roared with laughter, and said, 'God...damn it! You've trapped my queen!' We studied the board. I made a decisive move. 'Why the hell did I just say that?' he asked. If I hadn't-a...said it, you wouldn't-a...seen it.'" According to biographer Michael Munn, when Wayne was asked a question about the homosexuality of Rock Hudson, Wayne replied "Who the hell cares if he's a queer? The man plays great chess".
H. G. Wells
The British science-fiction novelist devoted an essay in his 1897 collection Certain Personal Matters titled "Concerning Chess" to humanity's passion for chess. Chess figures prominently in his short story "The Moth", and incidentally in his 1898 novel The War of the Worlds. According to biographer Vincent Brome, Wells was "bad, very bad" at chess.

== See also ==
- List of chess players#Famous people connected with chess
