= Transcendental chess =

Chess variant invented in 1978 by Maxwell Lawrence

Position: a8 black king, b8 black queen, c8 black bishop, d8 black bishop, e8 black rook, f8 black knight, g8 black rook, h8 black knight, a7 black pawn, b7 black pawn, c7 black pawn, d7 black pawn, e7 black pawn, f7 black pawn, g7 black pawn, h7 black pawn, a2 white pawn, b2 white pawn, c2 white pawn, d2 white pawn, e2 white pawn, f2 white pawn, g2 white pawn, h2 white pawn, a1 white bishop, b1 white rook, c1 white knight, d1 white king, e1 white rook, f1 white knight, g1 white queen, h1 white bishop

Transcendental chess. One of the possible starting positions.

Transcendental chess (TC) also known as pre-chess, is a chess variant invented in 1978 by Maxwell Lawrence. Chess960 (Fischer random chess) is similar but has fewer starting positions. In transcendental chess the beginning positions of the pieces on the back row are randomly determined, with the one restriction that the bishops be on opposite-colored squares. There are 8,294,400 such positions in total. In Chess960 there are 960 possible starting positions, but that is because the king must be located between the rooks and both sides must have the same starting position. In transcendental chess there is no such rule so the position of one side can be any of 4^{2}×6!÷2^{2} = 2,880. There is no castling. On the first turn a player, instead of making a move, can transpose any two pieces on the back row.

In Chess960 the back rows are mirror images, but in transcendental chess the setup of black and white is different 2,879 out of every 2,880 times (there being a 1-in-2,880 chance that both sides will draw the same setup). This can create inequalities in the position. One way to equalize these inequalities is to play a couplet: the players play two games with the same setup, one each as white and as black. To win the couplet, a player must win one game and draw or win the other. The other way to equalize the opening positions is auction transcendental chess, in which each player bids to give their opponent extra opening moves in order to play the side of the board they want.

In orthodox chess, innovations in opening play are increasingly hard to come by, with most good players having processed an extensive catalogue of opening moves—novelties tend to occur later in the game. Transcendental chess offers opening complexity and novelty immediately because every game starts in a dense and unfamiliar position.

== Variations ==
- D-chess: Similar to transcendental chess, but only one game is needed to be played against each opponent as the unequal starting positions are equalized with the weaker side having the option to transpose two pieces and then gets to move first.
