= Yonin shogi =

Four-player variant of Japanese chess

Opening setup of yonin shogi

Yonin shōgi, (四人将棋, ‘four-person chess’), is a four-person variant of shogi (Japanese chess). It may be played with a dedicated yonin shogi set or with two sets of standard shogi pieces, and is played on a standard sized shogi board.

== Rules of the game ==
=== Objective ===
The objective of the game is to capture all of the opponents’ kings as an individual or with the option of teaming up with one or two fellow players. Fast matches are common.

=== Game equipment ===
Four players play on a standard 9×9 shogi board, which is commonly colored black in dedicated yonin shogi sets. Each player has a 9-piece subset of the standard shogi pieces:

- 1 king
- 1 rook
- 2 gold generals
- 2 silver generals
- 3 pawns

=== Setup ===
Each side places their pieces in a triangular arrangement, facing toward the player opposite them, as shown below.

- In the rank nearest the player,
  - The king is placed in the center file;
  - The two gold generals are placed on either side of the king;
  - The two silver generals are placed next to the gold generals.

The four outside files are left empty.

- In the second rank,
  - The rook is placed in the same file as the king;
  - A pawn is placed on either side of the rook, in front of the gold generals.
- In the third rank, a pawn is placed in the same file as the king and rook.

9	8	7	6	5	4	3	2	1
		銀	金	王	金	銀			一
			歩	飛	歩				二
銀				歩				銀	三
金	歩						歩	金	四
王	飛	歩				歩	飛	王	五
金	歩						歩	金	六
銀				歩				銀	七
			歩	飛	歩				八
		銀	金	王	金	銀			九

1	2	3	4	5	6	7	8	9
		S	G	K	G	S			a
			p	R	p				b
S				p				S	c
G	p						p	G	d
K	R	p				p	R	K	e
G	p						p	G	f
S				p				S	g
			p	R	p				h
		S	G	K	G	S			i

Note: some common sets feature a black board with white pieces.

=== Gameplay ===
After the first player is determined, turns proceed clockwise from the first player.

Movement and capture are identical to standard shogi, except for check and checkmate. Each player has a full three-rank promotion zone as in standard shogi. Repetition, perpetual check, and illegal moves are also dealt with as in standard shogi.

=== Check and mate ===
Yonin shogi departs from standard shogi in its rules for check and checkmate, due to the complications of having four players. In yonin shogi, it is checkmate rather than forcing resignation that ends a player's game. These are not equivalent as they are in standard shogi: In yonin shogi a third player might capture the mating piece before the defeated player has a chance to resign; this is avoided by ending a player's game immediately upon checkmate.

In team play, check and checkmate do not count against the other member of one's team. They are simply ignored.

One player may inadvertently place a second player in check due to the movement of a third player's piece. This is a special form of discovered check unique to multiplayer chess variants. Similarly, if one player places a second player in check, a move of a third player may result in checkmate for the second player without the third player attacking directly. In yonin shogi, it is the player who makes the move that results in checkmate that gets credit for the checkmate, not the player who makes the initial check.

Once a king is in check, the threatened player immediately takes the next turn in defense and play continues clockwise from there. If two or three kings are placed in check simultaneously, the first player in the clockwise direction to defend takes the next turn.

=== Game end ===
When a player is mated, all remaining pieces except the king are left on the board and placed under the control of the mating player. Their original direction of movement is maintained. Any pieces held in hand are given to the mating player, but can only be dropped in the original direction of the mating player. The defeated king is turned upside-down and left as an obstacle for the remaining players. It cannot be captured or removed from the board.

In some descriptions of the game, the winner is the first player to checkmate twice, or to checkmate a player who has already checkmated another. In others, the winner is the last player standing. In the latter case, the first player to be checkmated is ranked fourth, the next is ranked third, and the player losing at the end is ranked second.

Because of the dead kings left as obstacles, it is possible for a player to be unable to make a legal move. This also counts as a loss.

It is possible to check or checkmate two or three players with a single move.

A bare king may remain on the board in opposition to the other players in an effort to increase its ranking. In a timed game, a bare king can move faster than its opponent, therefore it may attempt to win the game by forcing its opponent to run out of time. Note that some league tournaments may disallow this.

== Game notation ==
Yonin game notation is the same as that of shogi, except that there are four columns instead of two.

== History ==
This version of Yonin shogi was devised in 1993 by Ota Mitsuyasu, the former mayor of Hirata (present day Izumo) in Shimane Prefecture. It is a recognized variant and plastic play sets are available for as little as ¥300 (≈US$2.50). Yonin shogi sets were sold at the stand of the shogi hall. Some elementary schools even hold tournaments.

It is likely that four-person shogi has been played for many decades with rules made up as players went along. A fully complete and playable set of rules first appeared in a weekly children's magazine in February 1991. The primary differences between this and the current rules are in the pieces used (nearly a complete standard shogi set for each player) and the initial setup, which is also closer to standard shogi. In the diagram below, pieces are color-coded as to the player to whom they belong.

9	8	7	6	5	4	3	2	1
香	桂	銀	金	王	金	銀	桂	香	一
桂	角	飛				歩	角	桂	二
銀	歩	歩	歩	歩	歩	歩	飛	銀	三
金		歩				歩		金	四
王		歩				歩		王	五
金		歩				歩		金	六
銀	飛	歩	歩	歩	歩	歩	歩	銀	七
桂	角	歩				飛	角	桂	八
香	桂	銀	金	王	金	銀	桂	香	九

1	2	3	4	5	6	7	8	9
L	N	S	G	K	G	S	N	L	a
N	B	R				p	B	N	b
S	p	p	p	p	p	p	R	S	c
G		p				p		G	d
K		p				p		K	e
G		p				p		G	f
S	R	p	p	p	p	p	p	S	g
N	B	p				R	B	N	h
L	N	S	G	K	G	S	N	L	i

== Yonin shogi products ==
Besides game sets, there are a few other products available, such as:

- 4 Nin Shōgi, a video game for the Super Famicom.

== See also ==
- Sannin shogi (three-person shogi)
- Shogi variant
- Whale shogi
- Hasami shogi
- Annan shogi
- Ko shogi
