= Sannin shogi =

Three-player variant of Japanese chess

Sannin shōgi (三人将棋 three-person chess), or in full kokusai sannin shōgi (国際三人将棋 international three-person chess), is a three-person shogi variant invented circa 1930 by Tanigasaki Jisuke and recently revived. It is played on a hexagonal grid of border length 7 with 127 cells. Standard shogi pieces may be used, and the rules for capture, promotion, drops, etc. are mostly similar to standard shogi. (See that article for an explanation of these terms.) While piece movement differs somewhat from standard shogi, especially in the case of the powerful promoted king, the main difference in play is due to the rules for voluntary and mandatory alliance between two of the three players.

== Board and setup ==
The board is thought to have originally been in the shape of an equilateral triangle bordered by three rectangles which contained the players' home territories and promotion zones. However, in terms of movement this was equivalent to a hexagon, and the modern form of sannin shogi is played on a hexagonal board, rather like the central portion of a Chinese checkers board. The three players occupy non-adjacent sides of the board; the three ranks nearest to them are their territories and their opponents' promotion zones. The 'international' arena inside the three territories remains triangular.

The board is presented here with substitutions by standard shogi pieces; for the names actually used, see below.

Setup. If the pawns were removed, the rooks could capture the bishops, and the bishops could capture each other, as could the lances.

K = king 玉, G = gold 金, S = silver 銀, L = lance 香, B = bishop 角, R = rook 飛, N = knight 桂, p = pawn 歩.

The central cell is called the Pleasure Garden and is an additional promotion zone, except for the king. It is drawn with a heavy or double border or otherwise made visually distinct.

In the modern game, standard shogi pieces are used. Each player wields 18 pieces, the standard shogi set of 20 less one knight and one pawn. The pieces face away from the players: That is, they point toward the gap between the opposing players' territories.

The three players represent three countries, and are called First, Middle, and Last. If two players start the game as allies, the remaining player is automatically First. Otherwise any random method may be used to determine the order of play. Play then precedes clockwise from First to Middle to Last.

=== Board notation ===
The ranks are numbered a–m, and the files slanting left 1–13.

Standard shogi notation is used, with allowance made for the shape of the board. Numbering the ranks poses no problem: They are the rows that are horizontal from the viewpoint of Middle, and are given the letters a through m from top to bottom, with g being the central and widest rank. That is, the territories of First (top right player) and Last (top left player) span ranks a through i, and that of Middle (bottom player) occupies the three ranks k, l, m.

The numbered "columns" are the rows that run from top left to bottom right from the viewpoint of Middle. They are given the numbers 1 to 13 from right to left, with 7 being the central and longest column. That is, First occupies columns 1 to 3, while the territories of Middle and Last span columns 5 through 13.

The Pleasure Garden is thus cell 7g; the corners are at 1a, 1g, 7a, 7m, 13g, 13m; and at setup the three kings occupy 1d, 10m, and 10d; and the three knights 3e, 9k, and 9e.

== Movement on a hexagonal board ==
Because each cell of a sannin shogi board is a hexagon rather than a rectangle as in other shogi variants, the pieces will necessarily move differently. Instead of four faces with adjacent squares and four corners, for eight directions total, there are six each for a total of twelve. However, except for castling and the promoted king, which is reminiscent of the queen of Western chess (indeed, it moves like the queen in Gliński's hexagonal chess), the pieces are fair analogues of their standard-shōgi counterparts.

Except when castling, all pieces move in straight lines. These may be step moves, where a piece moves to the nearest cell in a particular direction, or ranging moves, where a piece may continue in a particular direction as long as it does not pass through an occupied cell.

There are two kinds of paths along which pieces move:

- Passing through one of the faces of the starting cell to one of the six adjacent cells, or through this adjacent cell to continue straight in that direction. These six contiguous paths are called orthogonals in this article. They are equivalent to the four orthogonal directions on a rectangular board.
- Passing through one of the corners of the starting cell and between two adjacent cells to reach one of the six cells just beyond, or continuing in a straight line in that direction, alternatingly passing through and passing between the cells. These six skipping paths are called diagonals in this article. They are equivalent to the four diagonal directions on a rectangular board. A piece may travel along a diagonal even if the adjacent cells it passes between are occupied, since it doesn't actually pass through these adjacent cells, and this is not considered a jump, just as on a rectangular board. There are no jumping moves in sannin shogi except for the king when castling.

These twelve directions correspond to the twelve hours on a clock: The orthogonals correspond to the odd hours (the direction of the hour hand at 1, 3, 5, 7, 9, and 11 o'clock), and the diagonals correspond to the even hours (the hour hand at 12, 2, 4, 6, 8, and 10 o'clock). Only the promoted king has the power to move in all twelve.

The twelve directions of movement, "orthogonal" (blue) vs "diagonal" (green). 駒 represents the moving piece. The promoted rook moves along any of the six solid blue lines, whereas the bishop moves along any of the six discontinuous green lines.

The twelve directions of movement and the corresponding hours on a clock face. The blue cells in the odd-hour directions are the first cells of the six orthogonals; the green cells in the even-hour directions are the nearest cells of the six diagonals. These are the twelve cells that step movers can reach.

== The pieces and their moves ==
Tanigasaki named the pieces after elements he considered basic to international affairs. However, they parallel the pieces of standard shogi, which are substituted for them in modern play; since the reader is likely familiar with these already, this article will use the piece names from standard shogi.

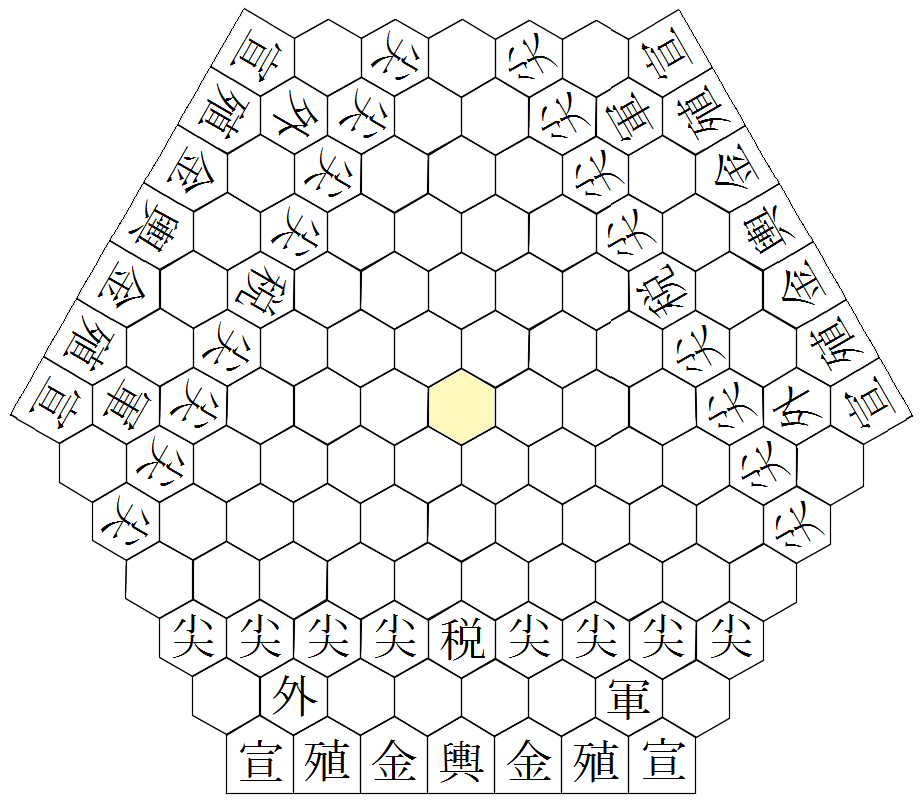
Sannin setup with the original piece names.

Piece	Pron.	English	Standard equivalent	English	Prom.	Pron.	English
輿論	yoron	Public opinion	玉将	King	旭光	kyokkō	Sunlight
軍教	gunkyō	Military education	飛車	Rook	竜化	ryūka	Heroism
外交	gaikō	Diplomacy	角行	Bishop	魔叉	masha	Witchcraft
金権	kinken	Financial influence	金将	Gold general	—		
税関	zeikan	Customs	桂馬	Knight	—		
殖貿	shokubō	Trade and industry	銀将	Silver general	宝	takara	Treasure
宣電	senden	Propaganda	香車	Lance	化	ka	Change
尖占	sensen	Colonist	歩兵	Pawn	弗	doru	Dollar

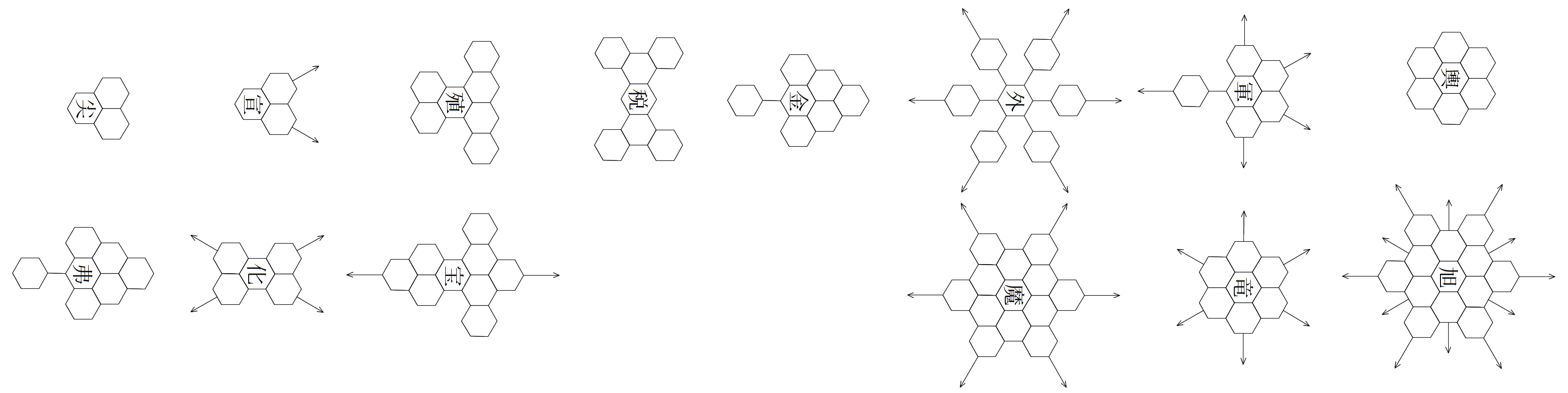
Summary of the pieces and their promoted movements

Color coding for different types of movement
The piece may step here, to the nearest cell (orthogonal or diagonal).
The piece may range along these rows, crossing any number of empty cells.
The promoted king may range in one of these directions, or illuminate (kill at a distance) in all.

=== The king ===
The king (K; "public opinion" in Tanigasaki's nomenclature) may step to any adjacent (orthogonal) cell (1, 3, 5, 7, 9, or 11 o'clock). A king may also castle on its first move, subject to certain restrictions (see below).

A promoted king (+K; "rising sun" or "sunlight") may range along any of the twelve orthogonals or diagonals.

King

The king steps all orthogonal directions; it is not equivalent to the standard shōgi or western king due being unable to move diagonally.

Promoted king

The promoted king ranges all directions; it is equivalent to a western queen with the additional power of "illumination" and status as a royal piece subject to check.

A promoted king also gains the power to "kill by illumination": It may capture, without moving, any pieces that it could capture if it were to move. That is, it may capture more than one piece, but only one piece in any direction and only if they are unprotected by either opposing player. (It is not clear if it must capture all such pieces, or if it may be selective.) It cannot combine this power with a physical move.

A king automatically promotes if the other two players enter into an alliance. A non-allied king (promoted or otherwise) that reaches the central cell of the board (the Pleasure Garden) wins the game.

=== The rook ===
The rook (R; "military education") may range along one of the forward or side orthogonals (9, 11, 1, or 3 o'clock), or along the diagonal directly backwards (6 o'clock).

A promoted rook (+R; "heroism") has a more powerful retreat: It may range along any one of the six orthogonals.

Rook

Promoted rook

The rook ranges along the 1,3,6,9,11 o'clock directions.

The promoted rook ranges orthogonally; it is equivalent to the standard-shōgi rook.

Rooks at startup

With the pawns removed at startup, the rooks (white) threaten the opposing bishops (orange) while protecting their own bishop.

=== The bishop ===
The bishop (B; "diplomacy") may range along any one of the six diagonals, and can reach only one-third of the board. (Compare Gliński's hexagonal chess, which has three bishops for this very reason.)

A promoted bishop (+B; "witchcraft") gains the power to step to any adjacent (orthogonal) cell. That is, it may move as a bishop or as a king, and can therefore reach every cell on the board.

Bishop

Promoted bishop

The bishop ranges diagonally; it is equivalent to the standard-shōgi bishop.

The promoted bishop ranges diagonally and steps orthogonally; it is equivalent to the standard-shōgi dragon horse

Bishops at startup

With the pawns removed at startup, the bishops (white) threaten each other. They protect the neighboring gold generals (green).

=== The gold general and the knight ===
The gold general, or simply 'gold' (G; "financial influence") may step to one of the orthogonal forward or side cells (9, 11, 1, or 3 o'clock), or to the diagonal cell directly forward or backward (6 or 12 o'clock).

The knight (N; "customs") may step to any side cell, orthogonal (3 or 9 o'clock) or diagonal (2, 4, 8, or 10 o'clock).

Neither has the ability to promote.

Gold

The gold general steps at 1,3,6,9,11,12 o'clock.

Knight

The knight steps at 2,3,4,8,9,10 o'clock.

=== The silver general ===
The silver general, or simply 'silver' (S; "trade and industry") may step to one of the orthogonal forward or rear cells (11, 1, 5, or 7 o'clock), or to one of the forward side diagonal cells (10 or 2 o'clock).

A promoted silver (+S; "treasure") gains the power to range along the forward and rear diagonals (12 and 6 o'clock).

Silver

The silver general steps at 1,2,5,7,10,11 o'clock.

Promoted silver

The promoted silver general gains a ranging move at 6 or 12 o'clock.

=== The lance ===
The lance (L; "propaganda") may range along either of the two forward orthogonals (11 or 1 o'clock). As a consequence, it may run out of room to move, and will thus be required to promote so that it can move further, although it is always advantageous to promote a lance.

As a lance can get stuck between the two promotion zones, it is unclear whether it's forced to promote, or simply stuck there until captured, since the former is true in shogi, and the latter is true in some of its variants.

A promoted lance (+L; "transformation") gains the power to range along the rear orthogonals (5 and 7 o'clock) as well.

Lance

Promoted lance

The lance ranges at 1 or 11 o'clock; it is equivalent to the standard-shōgi lance but with the ability to attack either opposing side.

The promoted lance ranges at 1,5,7,11 o'clock; it acquires the ability to reverse its course.

Lances at startup

With the pawns removed at startup, each lance (white) threatens the two neighboring lances. With the rook and bishop out of the way (bottom), they also threaten the rook and bishop across the board (orange), and the two lances behind them.

=== The pawn ===
The pawn (p; "colonist" or "pioneer") may step to either of the two forward orthogonal cells (11 or 1 o'clock). As a consequence, it may run out of room to move, and will thus be required to promote so that it can move further, although it is always advantageous to promote a pawn.

As a pawn can get stuck between the two promotion zones, it is unclear whether it's forced to promote, or simply stuck there until captured, since the former is true in shogi, and the latter is true in some of its variants.

A promoted pawn (+p; "dollar") moves like a gold general.

Pawn

The pawn steps at 1 or 11 o'clock; it's equivalent to the standard-shōgi pawn but with the ability to attack either opposing side.

Promoted pawn

The promoted pawn moves as a gold general, as does the standard-shōgi tokin.

== Capture ==
Capturing is done by displacement as in standard shogi. The one exception is the power of "illumination" of the promoted king.

A piece may be captured regardless of any alliance the mover may have with its owner. A castling king may capture as any other moving piece does.

== Drops ==
Like in shogi, but unlike most shogi variants, captured pieces are truly captured in sannin shogi. They are retained "in hand", and can be brought back into play under the capturing player's control. On any turn, instead of moving a piece across the board, a player can take a piece they have previously captured and place it on any empty cell, facing away from himself. The piece is now part of the forces controlled by that player. This is termed dropping the piece, or just a drop.

However, unlike in standard shogi, there being no proper files on a hexagonal board, there is no limit on the number of pawns per file. The restriction against dropping on the far rank (row a in the case of Middle) applies only to pawns and lances, as all other pieces can move from that position.

== Castling ==
Castling and promotion zones. Orange cells are Middle's home territory, where the king may jump when castling. Green cells are Middle's three promotion zones. Tan cells are international territory.

On its first move only, a king may jump to any vacant or enemy-occupied cell within its territory. There are two limitations to castling:

- The king must not be, or ever have been, in check.
- Once an alliance is formed, kings may no longer castle.

== Promotion ==
Promotion rules are similar to standard shogi, except for the larger number of promotion zones and the restriction against allied players promoting.

There are three promotion zones: Both of the opposing player's territories, plus the Pleasure Garden (the central cell of the board). In the case of the latter, only moves into or out of the Pleasure Garden are promotable moves: Passing through the cell does not count.

Unlike standard shogi, the sannin shogi king can promote; indeed, when an alliance is formed, the non-allied king is automatically promoted. (However, a king cannot kill by illumination when it promotes. That requires an additional turn, as promotion does not take effect until the end of the promoting move.) When using standard game pieces, promotion entails turning the king blank side up.

== Checkmate and winning the game ==
A player may not move into check or remain in check, even check by an ally. Likewise, a player may not check or checkmate an ally, and each player regardless of alliance must defend against check or threat of checkmate on the next move. (That is, if Middle and Last are allies, and First places Middle in check, Middle must answer the threat, even if they know or believe Last will come to the rescue.)

A player loses the game upon checkmate, and is not given the opportunity to resign on their next turn. (That is, if Middle and Last are allied, and First checkmates Middle, the game is over, regardless of whether Middle or Last recognize this and resign.) When mated, all of the player's pieces are removed from the board and from the game. They are not captured by the mating player. Play then shifts to the mating player, regardless of whose turn it would otherwise have been.

There are three ways to win sannin shogi:

- If each player plays independently, the player remaining after the other two have been mated is the winner.
- If there is an alliance, then the non-allied player wins by mating either opposing player, and the game ends. That is, a player whose ally loses, loses as well. However, if the non-allied player is mated, the alliance is dissolved, and the two erstwhile allies continue the game between them.
- If any player not in an alliance (whether there is one or not) moves the king or promoted king (that is, the Public Opinion or the Sunlight) to the Pleasure Garden, that player wins and the game ends. (Note that the prohibition against moving into check holds for this move as for any other. This is similar to the King of the Hill chess variant.)

== Alliances ==
Two players may team up against the third, forming an alliance. They may attack each other, but not place each other in check until the third player is defeated, at which point the alliance is annulled–alliances cannot otherwise be broken. They may not move each other's pieces.

Allies may attack each other to gain pieces-in-hand for drops, or to weaken each other in anticipation of the two-player end game. However, if either ally is checkmated by the third player, both lose, so these are dangerous tactics.

=== Formation ===
An alliance may be entered voluntarily before the start of the game. However, if two players gang up on the third at any time during the game, subject to the following definitions, an alliance is automatically formed. There are two types of coordinated attack that force an alliance:

- Discovered attack: One player moves out of the way of a second so that the second threatens the third with "material loss", and
- Dual attack: Two players in turn make threats of "material loss" against separate pieces of the third player, so that the third player cannot escape both threats.

Material loss is defined as any exchange that materially benefits the attacking player. This includes check, threatened checkmate on the next move, threats against undefended pieces (something for nothing), and threats by less valuable (weaker) pieces on defended but more valuable (stronger) pieces (uneven exchange).

Possible gain by the third player elsewhere is disregarded, even if this were to make up for the material loss caused by the coordinated attack. Likewise, the sequences of the moves are disregarded, even if they prove the loss of material is more apparent than real.

For the purposes of calculating threats of uneven exchange, promoted values are ignored; the ranging pieces rook and bishop are considered equivalent and more valuable than the step movers gold, silver, knight, and the lance, which are in turn considered equivalent and more valuable than a pawn. Finally, check can be considered the extreme case of uneven exchange, so the value scale is

K > (R = B) > (G = S = N = L) > p

Regardless of whether the situation is a discovered or a dual attack, it does not force an alliance if any attacking move is a direct defense against a threat of material loss, as defined above. That is, if First attacks Middle, and Middle defends by moving in such a way that First now checks Last (a discovered attack), this does not force an alliance between First and Middle. Or, if Last attacks First, and First defends by checking Last, and then Middle threatens Last's rook, this does not force an alliance between First and Middle either.

=== Rules changes ===
Several rules that change or come into force when an alliance is made have been mentioned above:

- Any of the three kings which has not already castled loses the ability to do so;
- The non-allied king is immediately promoted;
- Allied players lose the ability to promote their pieces, though any pieces already promoted remain so (it is not clear if the ability to promote returns once the alliance is dissolved);
- The two allied kings lose the right to win by reaching the Pleasure Garden (it is not clear if this ability returns once the alliance is dissolved);
- Neither ally may check or checkmate the other, and
- Both allies lose if either is checkmated.

== Sample game ==
Here are the first six moves of a game played at a meeting of the International Shogi Research Group on 28 May 1932. John Fairbairn describes some of the moves as "strange" considering the professional level of the players.

The players were,

First: Kimi Kinjiro (8-dan)
Middle: Miyamatsu Kanzaburo (7-dan)
Last: Yamamoto Kusuro (7-dan)

The game began without an alliance.

1.	P3c-4d	P10k-10j	P11g-10g
2.	S-2d	S-9l	S-10e	(all three players shield their kings with silvers)
3.	S-2e	P7k-6j	P8d-7d
4.	P-4e	R-7g+	Bx12l	(Middle rook promotes in Pleasure Garden; Last bishop captures Middle bishop)
5.	G-3d	Sx12l	P-9g	(Middle captures the attacking bishop)
6.	P4d-5e	+R-7l	R-10g	(Last rook lines up with Middle king)

== See also ==
- Yonin shogi (four-person shogi)
- Shogi variant
- Three-player chess
