= Rundlauf =

Thematic motif in chess

King and pawn ending

Position: c7 black king, a6 black pawn, c6 white pawn, a5 white pawn, c5 white king

White wins by using "triangulation."

A Rundlauf (German: [ˈʁʊntlaʊ̯f]) in chess is a thematic motif which occurs rarely in over the board play and occasionally is the subject of a chess composition or chess problem. A rundlauf is the movement of a single piece in a geometric shape such as a square or diamond, which accomplishes either a tactical or strategic goal (perhaps "round-trip" would be a good English equivalent to the German.) The idea often involves zugzwang, or repeating a position in order to create zugzwang, though it does not necessarily have to involve zugzwang. A famous example of a rundlauf is the well known endgame study the Saavedra position.

One simple example of such a pattern is "triangulation" in a king and pawn endgame, such as in the diagrammed position. Here, the white king triangulates and thus loses a move in order to put Black in zugzwang. The winning idea continues 1.Kd5 Kc8 2. Kd4 Kd8 3.Kc4 Kc8 4.Kd5 Kc7 5.Kc5 and the rundlauf is complete.

In Johnathan Levitt and David Friedgood's book entitled Secrets of Spectacular Chess, the Rundlauf is described as "the return of a piece to its initial square by a circuitous route. The piece usually describes a geometric figure, such as a rectangle..."
