= X-ray (chess) =

Chess tactic

In chess, an X-ray or X-ray attack is a tactic where a piece indirectly controls a square from the other side of an intervening piece. Generally, a piece performing an X-ray either:

- effects a skewer,
- indirectly attacks an enemy piece through another piece or pieces, or
- defends a friendly piece through an enemy piece.

== Examples ==
Position: a8 black rook, c8 black bishop, d8 black queen, e8 black rook, g8 black king, a7 black pawn, b7 black pawn, c7 black pawn, f7 black pawn, g7 black bishop, h7 black pawn, d6 black pawn, f6 black knight, g6 black pawn, d5 white pawn, e5 black pawn, c4 white pawn, d4 black knight, e4 white pawn, a3 white pawn, c3 white knight, e3 white bishop, f3 white knight, b2 white pawn, e2 white bishop, f2 white pawn, g2 white pawn, h2 white pawn, a1 white rook, d1 white queen, f1 white rook, g1 white king

Position arising from Black Knights' Tango: Black's rook X-rays White's pawn on e4.

Position: b8 black rook, c8 black bishop, d8 black queen, f8 black rook, h8 black king, f7 black pawn, h7 black pawn, c6 black knight, d6 black pawn, g6 black pawn, a5 black pawn, d5 white knight, a4 white rook, c4 white bishop, e4 white pawn, f4 white pawn, h4 black bishop, b3 white pawn, c3 white pawn, e3 white knight, d1 white queen, f1 white king, h1 white rook

Position after 21...Bh4+ 22.Kf1; after 22...f5, Black's rook on f8 X-rays White's king on f1.

The second usage is seen in the first diagram position, which arises from the Black Knights' Tango opening after 1.d4 Nf6 2.c4 Nc6 3.Nf3 e6 4.a3 d6 5.Nc3 g6!? 6.e4 Bg7 7.Be2 0-0 8.0-0 Re8 9.Be3 e5 10.d5 Nd4! Authors Richard Palliser and Georgi Orlov, in their respective books on that opening, both note that Black's rook on e8 "X-rays" White's e-pawn through Black's own pawn on e5. If 11.Nxd4 exd4 12.Bxd4 Nxe4 13.Nxe4 Rxe4. The identical position is reached, except that White has not played a2–a3, in the King's Indian Defense after 1.d4 Nf6 2.c4 g6 3.Nc3 Bg7 4.e4 d6 5.Nf3 0-0 6. Be2 e5 7.0-0 Nc6 8.Be3 Re8 9.d5 Nd4!

Of the second diagram position, arising from the Sveshnikov Variation of the Sicilian Defense, Atanas Kolev and Trajko Nedev observe, "On f1 the king is X-rayed by the f8-rook". They analyze the possible continuation 22...f5 23.exf5 Bxf5 24.Nxf5 Rxf5 25.Qg4 Bg5 (exploiting the pin along the f-file) 26.Kg2? Bxf4 27.Nxf4 Rg5 28.Nxg6+ Kg7 and White resigned in Delchev–Kotanjian, Kusadasi 2006.

Krasenkow vs. Seirawan

Position: a8 black rook, c8 black knight, e8 black rook, g8 black king, b7 black pawn, d7 black knight, f7 black pawn, g7 black pawn, a6 black pawn, c6 black pawn, d6 black bishop, h6 black pawn, a5 white pawn, d5 black pawn, f5 white pawn, b4 white pawn, d4 white pawn, e4 white pawn, h4 black queen, c3 white knight, d3 white bishop, h3 white pawn, c2 white queen, d2 white bishop, g2 white pawn, b1 white rook, e1 white rook, g1 white king

Position after 23...Qd8–h4!: the black queen X-rays White's pawn on d4.
Rauzer vs. Botvinnik

Position: a8 black rook, d8 black rook, g8 black king, a7 black pawn, b7 black pawn, c7 black queen, e7 black pawn, f7 black pawn, g7 black bishop, h7 black pawn, d6 black pawn, f6 black knight, g6 black pawn, c4 black bishop, e4 white pawn, f4 white pawn, c3 white knight, e3 white bishop, f3 white bishop, a2 white pawn, b2 white pawn, c2 white pawn, d2 white queen, g2 white pawn, h2 white pawn, a1 white rook, e1 white rook, g1 white king

Cafferty and Taimanov suggest 15.Qf2, removing the queen from the X-ray of Black's rook.

The first diagram position arose after 23...Qd8–h4! in Krasenkow–Seirawan, 34th Chess Olympiad, Istanbul 2000. Michael Rohde writes of Seirawan's 23rd move, "Holding things up through an x-ray on the pawn on d4." Black would respond to either 24.e5 or 24.exd5 with 24...Qxd4+.

Gerald Abrahams alludes to the X-ray concept, without using that term, when he cites the aphorism, "Put your rook on the line of his queen, no matter how many other pieces intervene." He writes, "That doggerel jingle incorporates some experience". A future world champion played in that manner in Rauzer–Botvinnik, USSR Championship 1933. Two moves before the second diagram position arose, Botvinnik had played 13...Rfd8, X-raying the white queen through the pawn on d6. Now Bernard Cafferty and Mark Taimanov suggest "15.Qf2 to get away from the 'X-ray' attack from the d8 rook". Instead, the game continued 15.Rac1 e5! 16.b3 d5!!, exploiting the queen's position on the same file as the rook and leading to a win for Botvinnik 13 moves later.

Petrosian vs. Ree

Position: a8 black rook, c8 black bishop, d8 black queen, e8 black king, h8 black rook, a7 black pawn, b7 black pawn, c7 black pawn, d7 black pawn, f7 black pawn, g7 black pawn, h7 black pawn, c6 white pawn, b4 black bishop, b3 white queen, f3 black pawn, g3 white pawn, a2 white pawn, b2 white pawn, d2 white pawn, e2 white pawn, f2 white pawn, h2 white pawn, a1 white rook, c1 white bishop, e1 white king, f1 white bishop, h1 white rook

Position after 8.Qd1–b3; the queen X-rays Black's pawn on b7.
Dorfman vs. Tseshkovsky

Position: a7 white queen, f7 black knight, g7 black king, g6 black pawn, e5 black queen, f5 black pawn, h5 black pawn, f4 white rook, h4 white pawn, b3 black rook, g3 white pawn, g2 white bishop, h2 white king

Black, on move, exploits his queen's X-ray of White's king along the b8–h2 diagonal.

The first diagram position arose from the English Opening in the famous miniature Petrosian–Ree, Wijk aan Zee 1971 after 1.c4 e5 2.Nc3 Nf6 3.Nf3 Nc6 4.g3 Bb4 5.Nd5 Nxd5 6.cxd5 e4?? 7.dxc6 exf3 8.Qb3! Author Iakov Neishtadt cites the game as an example of an "X-ray". Black resigned because the white queen's X-ray of his pawn on b7, through Black's bishop on b4, wins a piece after, e.g., 8...a5 (or 8...Qe7) 9.a3 Bc5 10.cxb7.

The above examples all involve a latent attack along a file or rank. A latent attack along a diagonal has also been called an X-ray. The second diagram position arose in Dorfman–Tseshkovsky, 46th USSR Championship Tbilisi 1978. Cafferty and Taimanov write, "Black can use the 'X-ray' attack of his queen on the enemy king to break up the white bastions". Black exploited the X-ray along the b8–h2 diagonal and won quickly after 48...g5! 49.hxg5 h4! with a decisive attack. The game concluded 50.g6 Kxg6 51.Qa6+ Kg5 52.gxh4+ Kxf4 53.Qc4+ Ke3+ 54.Kh3 Kf2+ 55.Qxb3 Nxg5+! and White resigned in light of 56.hxg5 Qh8#.

Position: a8 black queen, d8 black rook, g8 black king, f7 black pawn, g7 black pawn, h7 black pawn, a5 black pawn, d5 black rook, h4 white queen, h3 white pawn, d2 white rook, f2 white pawn, g2 white pawn, d1 white rook, g1 white king

White wins with the X-ray 1.Qxd8+!

Position: g8 black king, b7 black pawn, f7 black pawn, g7 black pawn, h7 black pawn, e6 black pawn, f6 black knight, c5 white knight, d5 black bishop, g4 white pawn, c3 white pawn, e3 white pawn, f3 white bishop, g3 white king, h3 white pawn, f2 white pawn

White wins a pawn with the X-ray 1.Nxb7!

The third usage is given by the American master and writer Bruce Pandolfini, who states that one usage of "X-Ray" is "a skewer defense along a rank, file, or diagonal" that "protects a friendly man through an enemy man in the middle along the same line of power". Jeremy Silman uses the term in the same way, illustrating "X-ray" with the two diagrams. In the first diagram position, White wins with the X-ray 1.Qxd8+! followed by 1...Rxd8 2.Rxd8+ (note how White's rook defended his queen through the black rook on d5) Qxd8 3.Rxd8# or 1...Qxd8 2.Rxd5 Qf8 3.Rd8 and wins. In the second diagram position, White wins a pawn with 1.Nxb7!, when White's bishop on f3 defends the white knight on b7 through Black's bishop on d5. Silman states that the X-ray "takes advantage of pieces that appear to be adequately defended but really aren't".

Fischer vs. Bisguier (variation)

Position: a8 black rook, b7 black king, c7 black knight, e7 white queen, h7 black pawn, b6 black pawn, c6 black pawn, e6 black pawn, e5 white pawn, g5 black pawn, c4 white pawn, d4 white pawn, g4 black queen, c3 white knight, f3 black pawn, d2 white bishop, f2 white pawn, g2 white pawn, h2 white pawn, f1 white rook, g1 white king

White defends with the X-ray 28.Qxg5.
Euwe vs. Loman

Position: a8 black rook, b8 black knight, d8 black queen, e8 black rook, g8 black king, b7 black pawn, e7 black knight, f7 black pawn, c6 black pawn, g6 black pawn, b4 black pawn, c4 white pawn, d4 black bishop, h3 white queen, a2 white pawn, b2 white bishop, d2 white pawn, f2 white pawn, g2 white pawn, c1 white king, d1 white rook, f1 white bishop, h1 white rook

White forced mate with the X-ray 17.Qh8+!

Raymond Keene also uses the term in this way in analyzing Fischer–Bisguier, New York 1957. Discussing a possible variation that could have arisen in that game (see first diagram position), Keene writes that 28.Qxg5 (when the white queen defends against 28...Qxg2# through Black's queen on g4) "defends the mate—an 'X-ray motif', as Fischer once described it".

In Euwe–Loman, Rotterdam 1923 (second diagram position), White forced mate with 17.Qh8+! Bxh8 18.Rxh8#. Neishtadt writes of 17.Qh8+, "The X-ray! The bishop at b2 attacks the square h8 'through' the enemy bishop."

== See also ==
- Chess tactics
