= Knight relay chess =

Chess variant

Knight relay chess (also called N-relay chess) is a chess variant invented by Mannis Charosh in 1972. In this game, knights relay their power to friendly pieces.

== Rules ==
The rules are the same as those of orthodox chess except as follows.

Except for the king or the knight, any piece that is defended by a friendly knight has the added power to move or capture like an orthodox knight. This power lasts as long as the piece remains defended by a friendly knight. Knights are immune from capture, cannot capture enemy pieces and cannot give check. A pawn can be promoted to a new knight, which has the same properties. A pawn may not move to or capture on its first or last rank using relayed knight power. If a pawn relays to its initial rank, it regains the option to make a double-step move. There is no en passant capture.

=== Example ===
Position: d8 black king, b7 white knight, c7 black circle, d7 black cross, e7 white circle, f7 black cross, g7 black circle, e6 white pawn, a5 black pawn, c5 black circle, g5 black circle, d4 white knight, f4 black circle, a3 white queen, c3 black knight, c2 black knight, e1 white king

The white knight on d4 relays knight power to the white pawn on e6. Circles indicate possible moves of the pawn; crosses and black circles indicate squares that the pawn attacks.

The diagram shows possible moves of the white pawn on e6. Since it is defended by a friendly knight on d4, it can (in addition to its normal abilities) move or capture like a knight to c7, c5, f4, g5 or g7. It cannot move or capture like a knight to the last rank, thus the black king on d8 is not in check. The white knight on b7 does not check the king either and cannot capture the pawn on a5. The white queen cannot take the black knight on c3. The white king is not in check by the black knight on c2.

White can deliver checkmate in this position by playing Qd6#. The black king cannot escape to c8 or e8, since the white queen attacks those squares via knight power relayed by the b7-knight.

== See also ==
- Annan shogi
