= Chess game collection =

The most common types of chess game collections are collected games of a single player (e.g. My Best Games of Chess 1908-1937 by Alexander Alekhine), annotations of games from a single tournament, collections of chess games covering a certain period of time (e.g. Oxford Encyclopaedia of Chess Games. Vol.1 1485-1866 by Levy and O'Connell), opening move collections, or collections centered on tactical or strategic themes (e.g. games featuring brilliant defense, attacking play, endgame technique, and so on).

Chess Informant is a series which collects chess games annotated by top players and publishes them in a language independent format.

Chess game collections can be categorized by:

1. OTB (Over the board)

2. Correspondence

3. Online played games

4. Engines vs engine

5. Engine vs human

6. Puzzles

7. mid games

8. endgames
