= Queen's Gambit Declined, Rubinstein Trap =

Position: a8 black rook, c8 black bishop, d8 black queen, e8 black rook, g8 black king, b7 black pawn, d7 black knight, e7 black bishop, g7 black pawn, h7 black pawn, a6 black pawn, c6 black pawn, d5 black pawn, f5 black pawn, d4 white pawn, e4 black knight, f4 white bishop, c3 white knight, d3 white bishop, e3 white pawn, f3 white knight, a2 white pawn, b2 white pawn, c2 white queen, f2 white pawn, g2 white pawn, h2 white pawn, c1 white rook, f1 white rook, g1 white king

White wins a pawn with 13.Nxd5.

The Rubinstein Trap is a chess opening trap in the Queen's Gambit Declined, Orthodox Defense. Black loses a pawn after Nxd5 due to the threat of their queen being trapped on the back rank by White's Bc7.

== History ==
The trap takes its name from Akiba Rubinstein, who had the misfortune of falling into it twice, in the games Euwe–Rubinstein, Bad Kissingen 1928, and Alekhine–Rubinstein, San Remo 1930. Rubinstein was not the first to fall victim to the trap; the first recorded game featuring the trap is Amos Burn–Heinrich Wolf, Ostend 1905.

Alekhine vs. Rubinstein, San Remo 1930

1. d4 d5 2. Nf3 Nf6 3. c4 e6

The Queen's Gambit Declined, Orthodox Defense.

4. Bg5 Nbd7 5. e3 Be7 6. Nc3 0-0 7. Rc1 Re8 8. Qc2 a6 9. cxd5 exd5 10. Bd3 c6 11. 0-0 Ne4 12. Bf4 f5? (see diagram)

Black falls into the trap.

13. Nxd5

White wins a pawn since 13...cxd5?? loses to 14.Bc7, trapping Black's queen.
