= Chess opening theory table =

A chess opening theory table or ECO table (Encyclopaedia of Chess Openings) presents lines of moves, typically (but not always) from the starting position. Notated chess moves are presented in the table from left to right. Variations on a given line are given horizontally below the parent line.

== Arrangement ==
Chess opening theory tables are commonly published in opening books with annotations by experienced chess players. These tables are typically arranged in a compact manner to allow experienced players to see variations from a position quickly. Usually, the table indicates that either White or Black has equal, slightly better, or better chances at the end of the variation. Often, this information is distilled down to mere symbols ("Σ" for example) or the percentage of games (usually tournament games) where White won – no information is usually given on what the assessment is based on or how to proceed in the game.

== Shortcomings ==
Chess opening theory books that provide these tables are usually quite large and difficult for beginners to use. Because the table entries typically do not include the themes or goals involved in a given line, beginners will either try to memorize the tables or simply drown in the detail. The Wikibook Chess Opening Theory aims to bridge this gap by providing this type of information at the end of each line.

== Notation ==
Typically, each table has a heading indicating the moves required to reach the position for which the table provides an analysis. The example below is for the opening position, so no moves are shown in the heading. The first row provides the move numbers with subsequent rows representing different variations. Since the initial position is not always the opening position, these numbers will not always start at "1." White half-moves are shown above black half-moves. Ellipses (...) represent moves that, for the variation, are identical to the variation above. Bold type indicates that another variation is considered elsewhere – usually in another table. A hyphen (-) or en dash (–) indicates that the variation transposes to a variation elsewhere. Transpositions are common in chess – a given position can often be reached by different move orders – even move orders with more or fewer moves. The table may also provide percentage of games won by white for each variation, based on the results of the games considered in creating the table.

== Development ==
Chess openings are studied in great depth by serious players. "Novelties", or new, previously unexplored variations are often discovered and played by professional players. These new lines can refute lines that were previously thought to be sound. The games that represent this discovery process are represented in these ever-changing and expanding tables. With the advent of computer databases, even the most casual player can explore an opening line deeply, looking for novelties to spring on their opponents.

== Example ==
	1	2	3	4	5	6	7	8	Σ: %
1	Nf3 c5	c4 Nf6	Nc3 d5	cxd5 Nxd5	d4 Nxc3	bxc3 g6	e4 Bg7	Rb1; 0-0	25: 42%
2	... d5	d4 Nf6	c4 c6	Nc3 e6	e3 Nbd7	Qc2; Bd6	b3 0-0	Be2 b6	16: 56%
3	... Nf6	c4 e6	Nc3; Bb4	Qc2; 0-0	a3 Bxc3	Qxc3 b6	b4 a5	Bb2 axb4	28: 63%
4	d4 d5	c4 dxc4	Nf3 e6	e3 Nf6	Bxc4 c5	0-0 a6	Bb3 cxd4	exd4 Nc6	33: 50%
5	......	... c6	Nf3; Nf6	Nc3 dxc4	a4 Bf5	Ne5; Nbd7	Nxc4; Qc7	g3 e5	28: 63%
6	... Nf6	c4 g6	Nc3; Bg7	e4 d6	Nf3; 0-0	Be2 e5	Be3 c6	d5 Ng4	28: 57%
7	......	......	... d5	cxd5 Nxd5	e4 Nxc3	bxc3 Bg7	Nf3 c5	Be3; Qa5	16: 59%
8	......	... e6	Nf3 d5	Nc3; Be7	Bf4; 0-0	e3 c5	dxc5 Bxc5	a3 Nc6	28: 52%
9	......	......	Nc3; Bb4	Qc2; 0-0	a3 Bxc3†	Qxc3 b6	Bg5; Bb7	f3 h6	23: 67%
10	......	......	......	... d5	cxd5 Qxd5	e3 c5	Bd2; Bxc3	Bxc3 cxd4	13: 46%
11	e4 e6	d4 d5	Nc3; Nf6	e5 Nfd7	f4 c5	Nf3; Nc6	Be3 cxd4	Nxd4; Bc5	31: 77%
12	... e5	Nf3; Nf6	Nxe5 d6	Nf3; Nxe4	d4 d5	Bd3; Nc6	0-0; Be7	c4 Nf6	16: 63%
13	......	......	......	......	......	......	......	... Nb4	20: 50%
14	......	... Nc6	Bb5; Nf6	0-0; Nxe4	d4 Nd6	Bxc6 dxc6	dxe5 Nf5	Qxd8+ Kxd8	24: 60%
15	......	......	... a6	Ba4; Nf6	0-0; Be7	Re1 b5	Bb3 d6	c3 0-0	35: 63%
16	... c5	Nf3; Nc6	Bb5 g6	0-0; Bg7	Re1 e5	Bxc6 dxc6	d3 Ne7	Be3 b6	29: 50%
17	......	......	Nc3 e5	Bc4 d6	d3 Be7	0-0; Nf6	Nh4; Nd4	g3 Bg4	16: 59%
18	......	......	d4 cxd4	Nxd4; Nf6	Nc3 e5	Ndb5 d6	Bg5 a6	Na3 b5	31: 56%
19	......	... d6	d4 cxd4	Nxd4; Nf6	Nc3 a6	Be2 e6	f4 Be7	Be3; 0-0	28: 45%
20	......	......	......	......	......	Be3 e6	f3 b5	g4 h6	32: 52%

== External sources of chess opening theory tables ==
- John Nunn (editor), Graham Burgess, John Emms, Joe Gallagher (1999), Nunn's Chess Openings. ISBN 1-85744-221-0.
- Nick de Firmian, Walter Korn (1999), Modern Chess Openings: MCO-14. ISBN 0-8129-3084-3.
- Aleksandar Matanović (editor), Encyclopaedia of Chess Openings, 5 volumes (Belgrade: Šahovski informator)
