= Legan chess =

Diagonal chess variant created in 1913

Position: a8 black king, b8 black knight, c8 black bishop, d8 black rook, e8 black pawn, a7 black bishop, b7 black queen, c7 black pawn, d7 black pawn, a6 black knight, b6 black pawn, c6 black pawn, a5 black rook, b5 black pawn, d5 black pawn, h5 white pawn, a4 black pawn, e4 white pawn, g4 white pawn, h4 white rook, f3 white pawn, g3 white pawn, h3 white knight, e2 white pawn, f2 white pawn, g2 white queen, h2 white bishop, d1 white pawn, e1 white rook, f1 white bishop, g1 white knight, h1 white king

Legan chess starting position

Legan chess (or Legan's game) is a chess variant invented by L. Legan in 1913. It differs from standard chess by the starting position as well as by pawn movements.

== Rules ==
The starting setup is illustrated. The game can be also played with the board rotated by 45° clockwise to make pawn movements easier to understand. There is no castling and no en passant. Otherwise, the rules of chess apply.

=== Pawn movement ===
Position: b6 black pawn, c6 black cross, b5 black cross, c5 black circle, e4 white circle, f4 black cross, e3 black cross, f3 white pawn

Pawn movements in Legan chess

Pawns move one square diagonally forward: White from right to left; Black left to right. They capture orthogonally in direction of movements (see diagram). The white pawn on f3 can move to e4 and capture on e3 and f4. The black pawn on b6 can move to c5 and capture on b5 and c6.

=== Pawn promotion ===
Position: a8 white circle, b8 white circle, c8 white circle, d8 white circle, e8 black pawn, a7 white circle, c7 black pawn, d7 black pawn, a6 white circle, b6 black pawn, c6 black pawn, a5 white circle, b5 black pawn, d5 black pawn, h5 white pawn, a4 black pawn, e4 white pawn, g4 white pawn, h4 black circle, f3 white pawn, g3 white pawn, h3 black circle, e2 white pawn, f2 white pawn, h2 black circle, d1 white pawn, e1 black circle, f1 black circle, g1 black circle, h1 black circle

Pawn promotion in Legan chess

Pawns promote on squares occupied in the initial position by the opponent's king, bishops, knights, and rooks. For example, white pawns promote on squares a5–a8–d8 (marked with white dots); black pawns on e1–h1–h4 (marked with black dots). Note that the pawns that start on d1, h5, a4 and e8 cannot promote without moving toward the center of the board via capturing.
