= Petrov's Defence, Marshall Trap =

Chess opening trap

Position: a8 black rook, b8 black knight, d8 black queen, f8 black rook, g8 black king, a7 black pawn, b7 black pawn, c7 black pawn, g7 black pawn, h7 black pawn, d6 black bishop, d5 white pawn, f5 black pawn, d4 white pawn, e4 black knight, g4 black bishop, d3 white bishop, f3 white knight, a2 white pawn, b2 white pawn, f2 white pawn, g2 white pawn, h2 white pawn, a1 white rook, b1 white knight, c1 white bishop, d1 white queen, e1 white rook, g1 white king

Position after 10.Re1?; Black wins with 10...Bxh2+!

The Marshall Trap is a chess opening in Petrov's Defence named after Frank Marshall.

== The trap ==
1. e4 e5 2. Nf3 Nf6

The trap begins with Black playing Petrov's Defence.

3. Nxe5 d6 4. Nf3 Nxe4 5. d4 d5 6. Bd3 Bd6 7. 0-0 0-0 8. c4 Bg4 9. cxd5 f5 10. Re1? (see diagram)

White should play 10.Nc3 instead.

10... Bxh2+!

An unexpected blow.

11. Kxh2

If 11.Nxh2, then 11...Bxd1.

11...Nxf2

Black forks the white queen and bishop, forcing the queen to move.

12. Qe2 Nxd3 13. Qxd3 Bxf3 14. Qxf3 Qh4+

Followed by 15...Qxe1 winning the e1-rook. Black has a winning material advantage.
