= Annan shogi =

Annan shogi (Japanese: 安南将棋 annan shōgi) also called Korean shogi, is a variant of shogi (Japanese chess). Annan shogi is a popular shogi variant in Japan.

== Gameplay ==
The game is played as standard shogi, except that, when a piece has a friendly piece on the square directly behind it, it has the movement of that piece instead of its own. A variant rule is that a piece may move like any friendly piece that protects it. The setup is somewhat different from standard shogi.

The game should not be confused with Korean chess, a variant of chess that is played in Korea, but which resembles xiangqi (Chinese chess) rather than shogi.

=== Setup ===
9	8	7	6	5	4	3	2	1
香 車	桂 馬	銀 将	金 将	王 将	金 将	銀 将	桂 馬	香 車	一
	飛 車						角 行		二
歩 兵		歩 兵	歩 兵	歩 兵	歩 兵	歩 兵		歩 兵	三
	歩 兵						歩 兵		四
									五
	歩 兵						歩 兵		六
歩 兵		歩 兵	歩 兵	歩 兵	歩 兵	歩 兵		歩 兵	七
	角 行						飛 車		八
香 車	桂 馬	銀 将	金 将	玉 将	金 将	銀 将	桂 馬	香 車	九

9	8	7	6	5	4	3	2	1
L	N	S	G	K	G	S	N	L	a
	R						B		b
P		P	P	P	P	P		P	c
	P						P		d
									e
	P						P		f
P		P	P	P	P	P		P	g
	B						R		h
L	N	S	G	K	G	S	N	L	i

== See also ==
- Shogi variant
  - Whale shogi
  - Hasami shogi
  - Unashogi
  - Ko shogi
- Knight relay chess
