= Displacement chess =

Family of chess variants

Position: a8 black rook, b8 black bishop, c8 black bishop, d8 black queen, e8 black king, f8 black knight, g8 black knight, h8 black rook, a7 black pawn, b7 black pawn, c7 black pawn, d7 black pawn, e7 black pawn, f7 black pawn, g7 black pawn, h7 black pawn, a2 white pawn, b2 white pawn, c2 white pawn, d2 white pawn, e2 white pawn, f2 white pawn, g2 white pawn, h2 white pawn, a1 white rook, b1 white bishop, c1 white bishop, d1 white queen, e1 white king, f1 white knight, g1 white knight, h1 white rook

A variation of displacement chess, where the queenside knight and kingside bishop have been swapped.

Displacement chess is a family of chess variants in which a few pieces are transposed in the initial standard chess position. The main goal of these variants is to negate players' knowledge of standard chess openings.

== Variations ==
The following variations were tried in master or grandmaster tournaments:

- In Il Gioco degli scacchi, Pietro Carrera gives sample play at a handicap where the stronger player’s king and rook are transposed. He calls this handicap odds of the castled king based on a contemporary rule of free castling. Moreover, he considers it worth slightly less than two pawns when the king and king’s rook are transposed and worth slightly less than the knight when the king and queen’s rook are transposed.
- White's king and queen are transposed. This arrangement was tried in a correspondence tournament in 1935 with the participation of grandmaster Paul Keres. This creates a reverse symmetrical starting position like Chaturanga is played from. In Chaturanga, this is done so the players’ starting generals, having only diagonals, will be able to attack each other.
- The queen's knight is transposed with the king's bishop, so that both bishops are on the queenside and both knights are on the kingside, as shown in the diagram. This variant is sometimes called Mongredien chess, after Augustus Mongredien, the sponsor of a tournament held in London during 1868 under the auspices of the British Chess Association, in which several strong British players took part, including Joseph Henry Blackburne. According to David Pritchard, this is one of the most popular forms of displacement chess.
- The knights and bishops are transposed. There is a record of a game under these rules between Joseph Henry Blackburne and William Norwood Potter in 1875.
- The rooks and bishops are transposed. This array was suggested by J. R. Capablanca after his match with Emanuel Lasker, but did not become popular. This variant is also called Fianchetto chess.
