= Portal chess =

Chess variant

Portal chess is a chess variant which uses at least two fairy pieces called portals (or less commonly portholes). These pieces can be easily added by using poker chips, coins or other suitably sized objects. The game seeks to incorporate portals to allow pieces to teleport around the board. Apart from the portals and their ruleset, the game often plays like ordinary chess, including the en passant capture, castling, and promotion.

== Versions ==
There are three versions of portal chess, created seemingly independently by three different people: David Howe in 1997, Mike Hidden some time before 2008, and Ian Buckley around 2012. They all, however, contain the core dynamic of teleportation and special squares/pieces for this, as opposed to other variants which allow transportation at any point and/or any time.

Throughout this article, the symbol "→" will be used to denote teleportation from one square to another.

=== David Howe version ===
a8	b8	c8	d8	e8	f8	g8	h8
a7	b7	c7	d7	e7	f7	g7	h7
a6	b6	c6	d6	e6	f6	g6	h6
a5	b5	c5	d5	e5	f5	g5	h5
a4	b4	c4	d4	e4	f4	g4	h4
a3	b3	c3	d3	e3	f3	g3	h3
a2	b2	c2	d2	e2	f2	g2	h2
a1	b1	c1	d1	e1	f1	g1	h1

A

a8	b8	c8	d8	e8	f8	g8	h8
a7	b7	c7	d7	e7	f7	g7	h7
a6	b6	c6	d6	e6	f6	g6	h6
a5	b5	c5	d5	e5	f5	g5	h5
a4	b4	c4	d4	e4	f4	g4	h4
a3	b3	c3	d3	e3	f3	g3	h3
a2	b2	c2	d2	e2	f2	g2	h2
a1	b1	c1	d1	e1	f1	g1	h1

B

Two-board variant with portals marked as corresponding numbers

In this version, there are two distinct playing areas linked by fixed portals. These areas can be either two separate boards or one board split down the middle (between the d- and e-files).

The rules that are different for this variant are:

- Players alternate play between area A and area B. So play might go 1:Ae4 Ba5 2:Bh4 Ae5
- If a player's piece is on a portal square when the player is playing in that board, he can declare an intent to teleport. He moves no other piece, and waits for his turn on the other board. He then teleports his piece but makes no other move, e.g. 20: 'Intends to teleport' qBe7 21: qAa4→Ba4 ...
- Teleportation is always between areas, and also between corresponding squares (as close to the original coordinates as you can get).
- If an opponent's piece occupies the target square when teleporting, it is captured normally. (qAa4→xBa4)
- If a friendly piece is on the receiving teleporter when 'Intent' is declared, the move is still lost but with no teleportation. This could be used as a pass function. e.g. 20: 'Intends to teleport' qBe7 21: (no move, piece in way) Aa6 ...
- If both players declare 'intent' in the same move, the teleportations are considered simultaneous. Thus no capture would occur between two pieces transporting together if they had just swapped places. e.g. 20: 'intent' 'intent' 21: Aa4→Ba4 Ba4→Aa4
- A king can be left in check so long as the player can move it before it could be captured. Thus discovered checks from teleportations are allowed as the player can move their king away before their opponent next plays that Area.
- All other rules are the same.

=== Mark Hidden version ===
Position: a8 black rook, b8 black knight, c8 black bishop, d8 black queen, e8 black king, f8 black bishop, g8 black knight, h8 black rook, a7 black pawn, b7 black pawn, c7 black pawn, d7 black pawn, e7 black pawn, f7 black pawn, g7 black pawn, h7 black pawn, a5 black circle, b5 black circle, e5 black circle, f5 black circle, c4 black circle, d4 black circle, g4 black circle, h4 black circle, a2 white pawn, b2 white pawn, c2 white pawn, d2 white pawn, e2 white pawn, f2 white pawn, g2 white pawn, h2 white pawn, a1 white rook, b1 white knight, c1 white bishop, d1 white queen, e1 white king, f1 white bishop, g1 white knight, h1 white rook

The locations of the portals are marked with black dots.

The portals in this game are neutral yet mobile.

The number and starting location of these portals can be different when the game begins, but the image shows the standard set-up.

In this game the portal pieces move around by very specific rules.

- A piece can only land on a portal square by attacking it. This means pawns move diagonally onto them, and knights must land directly on them.
- A piece can not jump over a portal, except for the knight.
- When a piece moves onto a portal, it must move to another portal. If no portals are free to do this, moving onto the portal is not allowed.
- When a piece has moved through a portal, the portal it attacked moves to where the piece used to be. So the early move 2: f3xg4→c4 moves the portal from g4 to f3.
- This also means portals may stack, and may be unstacked, but it is invalid to claim you have teleported from one stacked portal to another stacked portal (either where you have landed or elsewhere on the board).
- Pawns must move normally onto the back rank to promote. So a pawn that has teleported there does not promote, as he is stuck in the portal.
- Castling cannot occur if a portal is in the way, as the pieces cannot jump over it.
- All other ordinary rules apply.

=== Ian Buckley version ===
Position: a8 black rook, b8 black knight, c8 black bishop, d8 black queen, e8 black king, f8 black bishop, g8 black knight, h8 black rook, a7 black pawn, b7 black pawn, c7 black pawn, d7 black pawn, e7 black pawn, f7 black pawn, g7 black pawn, h7 black pawn, a5 black cross, b5 black cross, c5 black cross, d5 black cross, e5 black cross, f5 black cross, g5 black cross, h5 black cross, a4 black circle, b4 black circle, c4 black circle, d4 black circle, e4 black circle, f4 black circle, g4 black circle, h4 black circle, a2 white pawn, b2 white pawn, c2 white pawn, d2 white pawn, e2 white pawn, f2 white pawn, g2 white pawn, h2 white pawn, a1 white rook, b1 white knight, c1 white bishop, d1 white queen, e1 white king, f1 white bishop, g1 white knight, h1 white rook

Beginning layout of the board is standard. Possible sites for White's portal are marked with a dot, Black's possible spots are marked with a cross.

Position: a8 black rook, b8 black knight, c8 black bishop, d8 black queen, e8 black king, f8 black bishop, g8 black knight, h8 black rook, a7 black pawn, b7 black pawn, c7 black pawn, d7 black pawn, e7 black pawn, f7 black pawn, g7 black pawn, h7 black pawn, a5 black champion, e4 white champion, a2 white pawn, b2 white pawn, c2 white pawn, d2 white pawn, e2 white pawn, f2 white pawn, g2 white pawn, h2 white pawn, a1 white rook, b1 white knight, c1 white bishop, d1 white queen, e1 white king, f1 white bishop, g1 white knight, h1 white rook

An example first move that would be annotated 1: Pe4 Pa5

This version of the game has player-controlled portals, which are linked to each other.

The rules for these portals are worked out as though they make the squares they cover into one square. In the set up to the right, a5 and e4 can be conceptualized as the same square.

The specific rules for portal use are as follows:

- The aim of portal chess is the same as ordinary chess.
- Players place their portals anywhere on the fourth row from the players side before commencing a game.
- You can only move your colored portal.
- A piece passes through portal unless the portal is blocked.
- A piece can be blocked from entering a portal if a piece of the same color is on the other side.
- A piece can take pieces by traveling through a portal.
- Both portals cannot be occupied at the same time.
- A piece can check/checkmate players using the portal.
- A piece must exit the portal in the direction it traveled into the portal.
- A portal can be moved onto a piece causing it to teleport, unless the other portal is occupied by any piece.
- A player has a choice to move a chess piece or the portal piece in one turn, not both.
- If your own chess piece is occupying a portal, you cannot pass through or rest on the other unoccupied portal with another one of your own pieces.
- A piece can enter either portal regardless of color.
- If both portals occupy the same square, it creates a black hole, which will remove any pieces in the eight squares around it from the game, as well as any piece on the black hole. This also locks both the portals in place so they can no longer be moved.
- A portal can be moved regardless of whether it is occupied or not, the occupying piece does not move with the portal.
- If a piece occupies one portal and a whole turn phase end without the piece moving from the teleporter it does not teleport.
- A knight can jump over a portal piece.
- A pawn can become a queen by using a portal, thus the move ...→h8=Q is valid.
