= En passant =

Special pawn move in chess

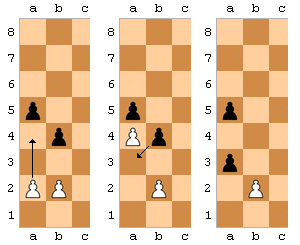
Example of en passant, ...bxa3 e.p.

In chess, en passant (French for 'in passing') (Note: French pronunciation: [ɑ̃ pasɑ̃]) describes the capture by a pawn of an enemy pawn on the same rank and an adjacent file that has just made an initial two-square advance. (Note: Article 3.7.4.1 in the FIDE Laws of Chess) This is a special case in the rules of chess. The capturing pawn moves to the square the enemy pawn passed over, as if the enemy pawn had advanced only one square. The rule ensures that a pawn cannot use its two-square move to safely skip past an enemy pawn.

Capturing en passant is permitted only on the turn immediately after the two-square advance; it cannot be done on a later turn. (Note: Article 3.7.4.2 in FIDE Laws of Chess) The capturing move is sometimes notated by appending the abbreviation e.p.

== Rules ==
Animation of an en passant capture

The conditions for a pawn to capture an enemy pawn en passant are as follows:

- the enemy pawn advanced two squares on the previous turn;
- the capturing pawn attacks the square the enemy pawn passed over.

If these conditions are met, the capturing pawn can move diagonally forward to the square the enemy pawn passed, capturing the enemy pawn as if it had moved only one square. If the right to capture en passant is not exercised immediately, it is lost. Making the capture is optional, unless there is no other legal move.

Example of an en passant capture

Black to move

Position: f7 black pawn, f6 black cross, e5 white pawn

The black pawn is on its initial square. If it moves to f6 (marked by ×), the white pawn can capture it.
White to move

Position: f6 black cross, e5 white pawn, f5 black pawn

Black moves their pawn forward two squares in a single move from f7 to f5, "passing" f6.
Black to move

Position: f6 white pawn

White captures the black pawn en passant, as if it had moved only one square to f6.

Only pawns may capture or be captured en passant. The en passant capture is the only capturing move in chess where the capturing piece moves to a square not occupied by the captured piece.

Because many casual players are unfamiliar with or misunderstand the en passant rule, administrators on internet chess sites frequently receive erroneous complaints of bugs, cheating or hacking.

== Notation ==
In algebraic notation, an en passant capture is notated using the capturing pawn's destination square. In both algebraic and descriptive notation, the move may optionally be denoted by appending "e.p." or similar. For example, in algebraic notation, bxa3 or bxa3 e.p. may be used to represent a black pawn on b4 capturing a white pawn on a4 en passant.

== Examples ==
Position: a8 black rook, b8 black knight, c8 black bishop, d8 black queen, e8 black king, f8 black bishop, h8 black rook, a7 black pawn, b7 black pawn, c7 black pawn, d7 black circle, f7 black pawn, g7 black pawn, h7 black pawn, d6 black cross, d5 black pawn, e5 white pawn, d4 white queen, e4 black knight, f3 white knight, a2 white pawn, b2 white pawn, c2 white pawn, f2 white pawn, g2 white pawn, h2 white pawn, a1 white rook, b1 white knight, c1 white bishop, e1 white king, f1 white bishop, h1 white rook

Black just played 5...d7-d5. White's e5-pawn can capture en passant.

Some chess openings feature the en passant capture. In the following line from Petrov's Defence, White captures the pawn on d5 en passant on move 6:

1. e4 e5
2. Nf3 Nf6
3. d4 exd4
4. e5 Ne4
5. Qxd4 d5 (see diagram)
6. exd6 e.p.

Position: a8 black rook, b8 black knight, c8 black bishop, d8 black queen, e8 black king, f8 black bishop, g8 black knight, h8 black rook, a7 black pawn, b7 black pawn, c7 black pawn, f7 black pawn, g7 black pawn, h7 black pawn, d6 white pawn, e6 black pawn, a2 white pawn, b2 white pawn, c2 white pawn, d2 white pawn, f2 white pawn, g2 white pawn, h2 white pawn, a1 white rook, b1 white knight, c1 white bishop, d1 white queen, e1 white king, f1 white bishop, g1 white knight, h1 white rook

Position after 3.exd6 e.p.

An en passant capture can occur as early as move 3. For example, in the French Defence after 1.e4 e6 2.e5 d5, White can play 3.exd6 e.p. (diagram). This has occurred in competition, for example in the game Steinitz–Fleissig, Vienna 1882.

Gundersen vs. Faul, 1928

Position: a8 black rook, c8 black bishop, d8 black queen, f8 black rook, a7 black pawn, b7 black pawn, e7 black knight, g7 black pawn, e6 black pawn, g6 black king, d5 black pawn, e5 white pawn, f5 black pawn, g5 white knight, b4 black bishop, d4 black knight, g4 white queen, h4 white pawn, c3 white knight, a2 white pawn, b2 white pawn, f2 white pawn, g2 white pawn, a1 white rook, c1 white bishop, e1 white king, h1 white rook

Position after 12...f7-f5

Position: a8 black rook, c8 black bishop, d8 black queen, f8 black rook, a7 black pawn, b7 black pawn, e7 black knight, e6 white knight, h6 black king, d5 black pawn, e5 white pawn, f5 black pawn, g5 black pawn, h5 white pawn, b4 black bishop, d4 black knight, g4 white queen, c3 white knight, a2 white pawn, b2 white pawn, f2 white pawn, g2 white pawn, a1 white rook, c1 white bishop, e1 white king, h1 white rook

After 14...g7-g5, White mates by capturing the pawn en passant.

In a game between Gunnar Gundersen and Albert H. Faul, Black played 12...f7-f5. White could have captured the black f-pawn en passant with his e-pawn, but he instead played:

13. h5+ Kh6 14. Nxe6+

The bishop on c1 effects a discovered check. 14...Kh7 results in 15.Qxg7#.

14... g5 15. hxg6 e.p.#

The en passant capture places Black in double check and checkmate (in fact, White's bishop is not necessary for the mate). An en passant capture is the only way a double check can be delivered without one of the checking pieces moving, as in this case.

The largest known number of en passant captures in one game is three. This record is shared by three games; in none of them were all three captures by the same player. The earliest known example is a 1980 game between Alexandru Segal and Karl-Heinz Podzielny.

== History ==
In early versions of chess, the pawn could not advance two squares on its first move. The two-square advance was introduced later, between the 13th and 16th centuries, to speed up games. The en passant capture may have been introduced at that time, or it may have come later; references to en passant captures appear in the books by the 16th-century Spanish chess master Ruy López de Segura.

The en passant capture was one of the last major additions to European chess. (Note: Other relatively recent rule changes include the addition of castling, alterations to the abilities of the queen and bishop (Spanish master Ruy López de Segura gives the rule in his 1561 book Libro de la invencion liberal y arte del juego del axedrez), and alterations to promotion.) In some parts of Europe, particularly in Italy, there was no such rule; this was known as passar battaglia. In 1880, Italy adopted the rules used by the rest of the world, including the en passant capture, in preparation for the 1881 Milan tournament.

== Draw by repetition and stalemate ==
In the context of threefold and fivefold repetition, two positions are considered different if the opportunity to perform a given en passant capture exists in one position but not the other.

When a player is not in check, and capturing en passant is the only legal move, the player may not claim a draw by stalemate. In his book on chess organisation and rules, International Arbiter Kenneth Harkness wrote that people frequently asked if this is the case. Chess players debated this point in the 19th century, with some arguing that the right to capture en passant is a "privilege" that one cannot be compelled to exercise. In his 1860 book Chess Praxis, Howard Staunton wrote that the en passant capture is mandatory in such a position; the rules of chess were amended to make this clear.

== Chess problems ==
The en passant capture is often used as a theme in chess problems. According to Kenneth S. Howard, "En passant pawn captures frequently produce striking effects in the opening and closing of lines, both for white and black." By retrograde analysis convention, a pawn may be captured en passant only if it can be proven to have advanced two squares on the previous move.

Kenneth S. Howard, 1938

Position: a8 white bishop, f8 black knight, d7 black pawn, e7 black pawn, f7 black pawn, b6 white knight, c6 black pawn, e6 black king, h6 white knight, c5 white pawn, e5 white pawn, c4 black pawn, e4 black pawn, h4 black pawn, g3 white bishop, d2 white pawn, f2 white pawn, a1 white queen, e1 white rook, g1 white king

White to play and mate in three

In the diagrammed 1938 composition by Howard, the key

1. d4!

introduces the threat 2.d5+ cxd5 3.Bxd5#. Black can capture the d4-pawn en passant in either of two ways:

1... exd3 e.p.

shifting the e4-pawn from the e- to the d-file, preventing an en passant capture after White plays 2.f4. To stop the threat of 3.f5#, Black can advance 2...f5, but this allows White to play 3.exf6 e.p.# due to the decisive opening of the e-file.

Or Black can play

1... cxd3 e.p.

and now White exploits the newly opened a2–g8 diagonal with 2.Qa2+ d5 3.cxd6 e.p.#.

O. Sommerfeldt, 1902

Position: b7 black bishop, f7 black queen, a6 white bishop, g5 black pawn, b4 white rook, e4 black pawn, f4 black king, g4 white pawn, h4 black pawn, b3 black pawn, h3 white pawn, b2 white queen, d2 white pawn, g2 white king

White to play and mate in two

The diagrammed composition by Sommerfeldt shows the effect of pins on en passant captures.

The key

1. d4!

threatens 2.Qf2#. The moves of the black e-pawn are restricted in an unusual manner. The en passant capture 1...exd3 e.p.+ is illegal (it exposes Black’s king to check), but

1... e3+

is legal. This, however, removes the black king's access to e3, allowing

2. d5#
