= ICCF numeric notation =

Chess notation system

18	28	38	48	58	68	78	88
17	27	37	47	57	67	77	87
16	26	36	46	56	66	76	86
15	25	35	45	55	65	75	85
14	24	34	44	54	64	74	84
13	23	33	43	53	63	73	83
12	22	32	42	52	62	72	82
11	21	31	41	51	61	71	81

ICCF numeric notation is the official chess notation system of the International Correspondence Chess Federation. The system was devised for use in international correspondence chess to avoid the potential confusion of using algebraic notation, as the chess pieces have different abbreviations depending on language.

In ICCF numeric notation, each square of the chessboard has a two-digit designation. The first digit is the number of the file; files are numbered 1 to 8 from left to right from White's point of view. The second digit is the rank; ranks are numbered 1 to 8 from nearest to farthest from White's point of view. Each move is denoted by either four or five digits: the first two digits denote the square the moving piece leaves; the following two digits denote the square at which the moving piece arrives; and, where applicable, the fifth digit denotes the piece of promotion.

In recent years, the majority of correspondence chess games have been played on Internet servers, on which the moves are entered using a graphical interface. This, along with the near-universal acceptance of algebraic notation, has led to a decline in the use of ICCF numeric notation.

== Details ==
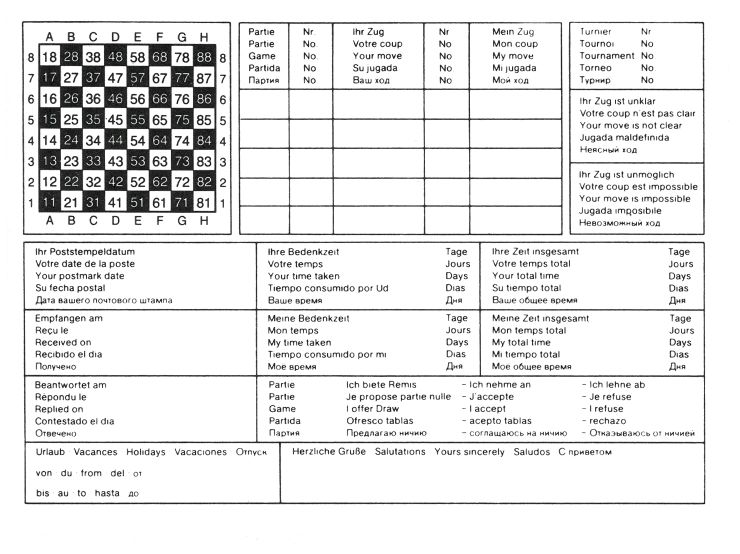
Correspondence chess card showing algebraic notation and ICCF notation

In numeric notation, each square is designated with a two-digit number via a coordinate system. The first digit describes the file and the second digit the rank. Files are numbered 1 to 8 from White's left to White's right, and ranks are numbered 1 to 8 from White's near side to White's far side. A move is defined by pairing two square designations together, one for the starting square and one for the ending square. For example, the move that would be written 1.e4 in algebraic notation would be written 1. 5254 in numeric notation: the pawn starts from square 52 (file 5, rank 2) and moves to square 54 (file 5, rank 4). Numeric notation does not explicitly mark the type of moving piece, captures, or checks; every move is written as four digits unless resulting in promotion.

For promotion, a fifth digit is added to the move's notation: 1 for queen, 2 for rook, 3 for bishop, and 4 for knight. For instance, a pawn on f7 moving to f8 and promoting to a rook would be written as 67682. A variant four-digit notation where the ending rank is omitted (because it is always 8 for White and 1 for Black) also exists (e.g. 6762); however, this is considered confusing and contradicts the standard.

Castling is written using the king's start position and end position. Castling kingside is written as 5171 for White and 5878 for Black, and castling queenside is written as 5131 for White and 5838 for Black. The rook's start and end positions are implied.

== History ==
German professor J. W. D. Wildt of Göttingen devised numeric notation circa 1803. Johann Koch used the system 25 years later; the system is sometimes named after him. Ivan Savenkov supported its use in 1877, and it bears his name in Russia.

== See also ==
- Descriptive notation
- Forsyth–Edwards Notation
- Portable Game Notation
