= Chess symbols in Unicode =

Text characters representing chess pieces

Font depictions of Unicode chess symbols (in the same order as the table): DejaVu Sans, FreeSerif, Quivira, Pecita.

Unicode has text representations of chess pieces. These allow to produce the symbols using plain text without the need of a graphics interface. The inclusion of the chess symbols enables the use of figurine algebraic notation, which replaces the letter that stands for a piece by its symbol, e.g. ♛f1 instead of Qf1. This also allows the play of chess games in text-only environments, such as the terminal.

== Chess piece symbols ==
Unicode 15.1 specifies a total of 110 spread across two blocks. The standard set of chess pieces—king, queen, rook, bishop, knight, or pawn, with white and black variants—were included in the block Miscellaneous Symbols. In Unicode 12.0, the Chess Symbols block (U+1FA00–U+1FA6F) was allocated for inclusion of extra chess piece representations. This includes fairy chess pieces, such as rotated pieces, neutral (neither white nor black) pieces, knighted pieces, equihoppers, as well as xiangqi pieces.

In 2024, four shatranj pieces were provisionally assigned for a future version in the range U+1FA54–U+1FA57. This was completed in Unicode 17.0.

=== Miscellaneous symbols ===
Chess Symbols Unicode.org chart (PDF)
Name	Symbol	Code point	HTML (decimal)	HTML (hex)
white chess king	♔	U+2654	&#9812;	&#x2654;
white chess queen	♕	U+2655	&#9813;	&#x2655;
white chess rook	♖	U+2656	&#9814;	&#x2656;
white chess bishop	♗	U+2657	&#9815;	&#x2657;
white chess knight	♘	U+2658	&#9816;	&#x2658;
white chess pawn	♙	U+2659	&#9817;	&#x2659;
black chess king	♚	U+265A	&#9818;	&#x265A;
black chess queen	♛	U+265B	&#9819;	&#x265B;
black chess rook	♜	U+265C	&#9820;	&#x265C;
black chess bishop	♝	U+265D	&#9821;	&#x265D;
black chess knight	♞	U+265E	&#9822;	&#x265E;
black chess pawn	♟︎	U+265F	&#9823;	&#x265F;

== Emoji ==
In Unicode 11.0, an emojified representation of the character U+265F ♟ BLACK CHESS PAWN was added. As of Unicode 15.1, only this character has an emoji version. In 2024, a proposal was submitted to include emoji versions of the other standard chess symbols.

Emoji variation sequences
U+	265F
default presentation	text
base code point	♟
base+VS15 (text)	♟︎
base+VS16 (emoji)	♟️

== Table of symbols ==
List of Unicode chess symbols^{[1]}^{[2]}
	0	1	2	3	4	5	6	7	8	9	A	B	C	D	E	F
U+265x					♔	♕	♖	♗	♘	♙	♚	♛	♜	♝	♞	♟
U+1FA0x	🨀	🨁	🨂	🨃	🨄	🨅	🨆	🨇	🨈	🨉	🨊	🨋	🨌	🨍	🨎	🨏
U+1FA1x	🨐	🨑	🨒	🨓	🨔	🨕	🨖	🨗	🨘	🨙	🨚	🨛	🨜	🨝	🨞	🨟
U+1FA2x	🨠	🨡	🨢	🨣	🨤	🨥	🨦	🨧	🨨	🨩	🨪	🨫	🨬	🨭	🨮	🨯
U+1FA3x	🨰	🨱	🨲	🨳	🨴	🨵	🨶	🨷	🨸	🨹	🨺	🨻	🨼	🨽	🨾	🨿
U+1FA4x	🩀	🩁	🩂	🩃	🩄	🩅	🩆	🩇	🩈	🩉	🩊	🩋	🩌	🩍	🩎	🩏
U+1FA5x	🩐	🩑	🩒	🩓	🩔	🩕	🩖	🩗								
U+1FA6x	🩠	🩡	🩢	🩣	🩤	🩥	🩦	🩧	🩨	🩩	🩪	🩫	🩬	🩭		
Notes 1.As of Unicode version 15.1 2.Light grey areas indicate non-chess symbols; dark grey areas indicate non-assigned code points
