= Descriptive notation =

Notation for recording chess games

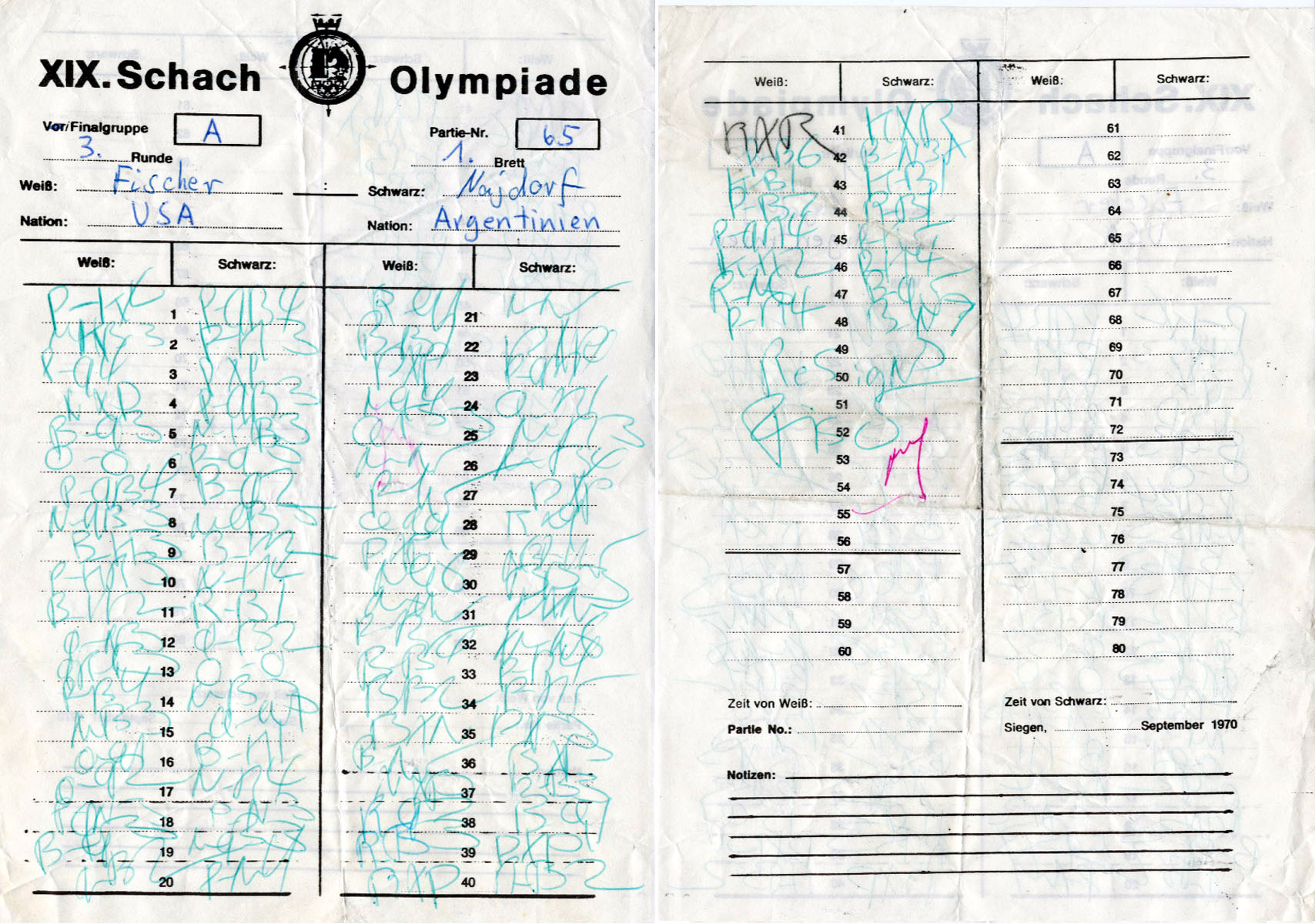
Scoresheet in descriptive notation used by Bobby Fischer in a 1970 game against Miguel Najdorf.

Descriptive notation is a chess notation system based on abbreviated natural language. Its distinctive features are that it refers to files by the piece that occupies the back rank square in the starting position and that it describes each square two ways depending on whether it is from White or Black's point of view. It was common in English, Spanish and French chess literature until about 1980. In most other languages, the more concise algebraic notation was in use. Since 1981, FIDE no longer recognizes descriptive notation for the purposes of dispute resolution, and algebraic notation is now the accepted international standard.

== Description ==
=== Nomenclature ===
With the exception of the knight, each piece is abbreviated as the first letter of its name: K for king, Q for queen, R for rook, B for bishop, and P for pawn. As knight begins with the same letter as king, it is abbreviated as either N or Kt, the former being the modern convention. In 1944, Chess Review received many letters debating the change from Kt to N.

Names of the squares in English descriptive notation

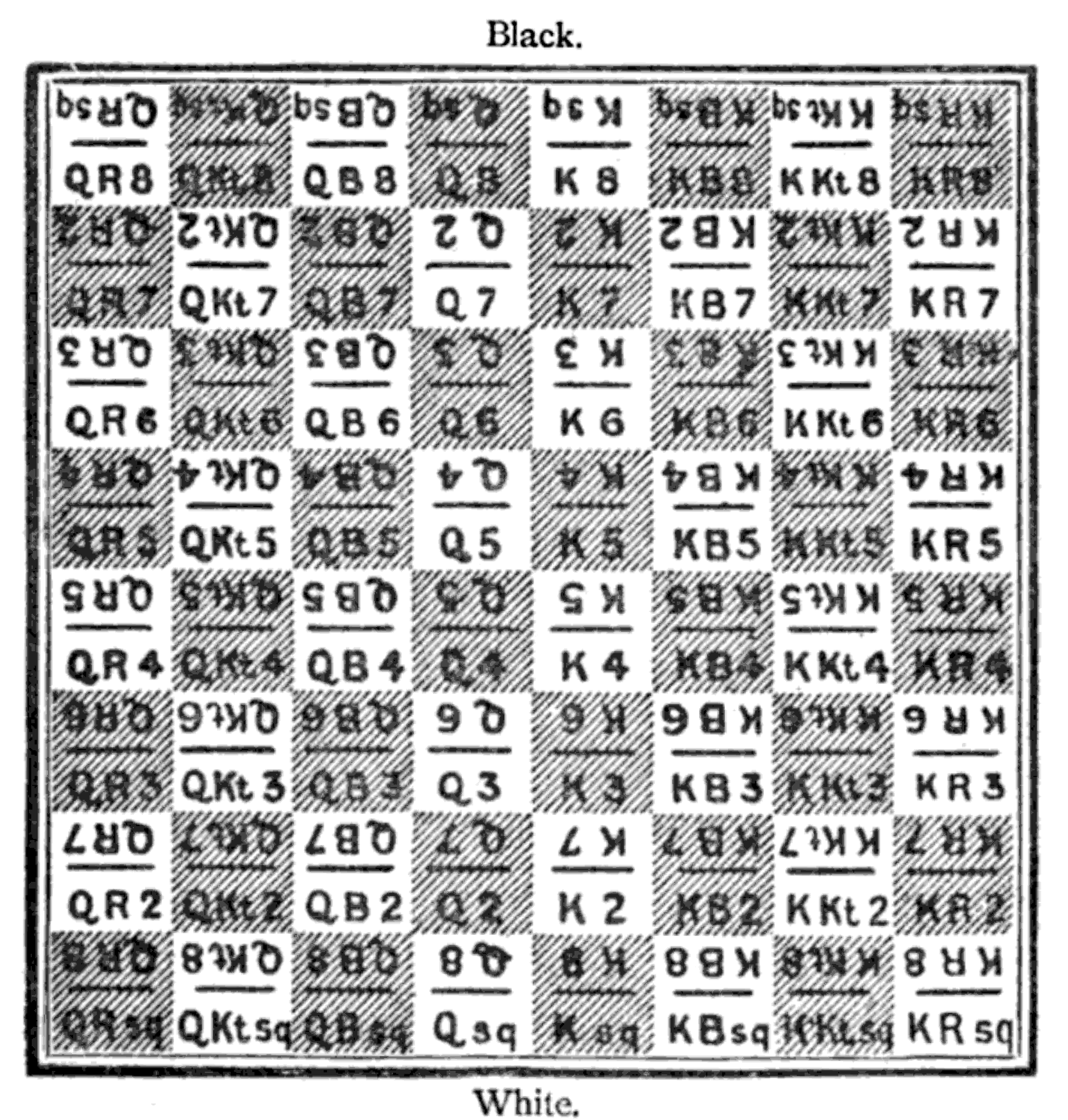
1909 diagram showing the square names from the point-of-view of each player. Note the use of "Kt" for knight, and "Sq." (square) for the first rank.

Each square has two names, depending on the viewpoint of White or Black. Each file is given a name corresponding to the piece that occupies the first rank at the start of the game. Thus, in English descriptive notation the queen's file is named "Q" and the king's file is named "K". Since there are two each of the remaining pieces on the first rank, it is necessary to distinguish between them. The pieces on the queen's side of the board (to White's left; to Black's right) are named with respect to the queen, i.e. "queen's rook", "queen's knight" and "queen's bishop"; and have the shortened names "QR", "QN" and "QB", respectively. Similarly, the pieces on the king's side (White's right; Black's left) are named with respect to the king, i.e. "king's rook", "king's knight" and "king's bishop"; and have the shortened names "KR", "KN" and "KB". The rank is given a number, ranging from 1 to 8, with rank 1 being closest to the player. In 19th century chess literature the first rank is usually called simply the "[piece]'s square", so "K1" ("King One") is called "King's square" (K. Sq.). Sometimes both "1" and "sq" are omitted, so "Rook to King 1" is written R–K.

This method of naming the squares means that each square has one name from White's point of view and another from Black's. For a full diagram of the board using this naming method, see the image above.

When recording a move by White, the naming from White's point of view is used; when recording a move by Black, the naming from Black's point of view is used.

Spanish descriptive notation uses a similar system, with a few differences:

- The initials to identify the pieces are taken from the equivalent Spanish words: R = rey (king), D = dama (queen), T = torre (rook), C = caballo (knight), A = alfil (bishop) and P = peón (pawn). The files are named after the initials of the pieces on the first rank, with those on the queen's side being suffixed by the letter "D", and those on the king's side suffixed by the letter "R". From White's left to right along the first rank this yields: TD, CD, AD, D, R, AR, CR, TR.
- The dash, which in English descriptive notation symbolizes the word "to", is omitted.
- The numerical rank is identified before the file, e.g. "4R" is equivalent to "K4" (e4 in algebraic notation).

In Spanish descriptive notation the Sicilian Defence (1. P–K4 P–QB4 in English) would be written 1. P4R P4AD (peón al cuatro del rey, peón al cuatro del alfil de la dama). This is also the method used in French descriptive notation.

=== Notation for moves ===
Each move is notated by a sequence of characters that is structured based on the move's type. Special indicators are added to the end of the sequence if relevant.

- Non-capturing move: A move without capture is notated by the piece's name, a hyphen and the destination square, e.g. N–QB3 (knight to queen's bishop 3) and P–QN4 (pawn to queen's knight 4).
- Capture: A capture is notated by the piece's name, a cross (×), and the name of the piece captured, e.g. Q×N (queen captures knight).
- Castling: The notation O-O is used for castling kingside and O-O-O for castling queenside. The word "Castles" is sometimes used instead, particularly in older literature, in which case it may be necessary to disambiguate between kingside and queenside castling; this may be done by specifying the rook or side, i.e. "Castles KR," "Castles Q,"or "Castles queenside".
- Promotion: Parentheses are used to indicate promotion, with the promotion piece enclosed in parentheses, e.g. P–R8(Q). Sometimes a slash or an equal sign is used, e.g. P–N8/R, P×R=N.
- Special terms and symbols: Special indicators that are appended to the move include "e.p." (en passant), "ch" or "+" (check), "?" (a question mark for a bad move), "!" (an exclamation mark for a good move), "mate" or "++" (checkmate), "resigns" and "draw".

Typically, the full designation for a piece or a file is shortened to just the last part (indicating type of piece) whenever this does not produce ambiguity. For example, the move KP–K4 would always be written P–K4 since only one pawn can move to K4 without capturing; the move Q–QB4 would be written Q–B4 whenever Q–KB4 is not a legal move. A pawn capturing a pawn may be shown as P×P if it is the only one possible, or as BP×P if only one of the player's bishop's pawns can capture a pawn, or as QBP×P, P×RP(R6) or P×QBP or other such variations.

Disambiguation of pieces using notations like QBP and KR becomes awkward once the pieces have left their starting positions (or for pawns, left their starting files), and is impossible for pieces created by promotion (such as a second queen). So as an alternative, moves may also be disambiguated by giving the starting square or the square of a capture, delimited by parentheses or a slash, e.g. B×N/QB6 or R(QR3)–Q3. Sometimes only the rank or file is indicated, e.g. R(6)×N.

When listing the moves of a game, first the move number is written, then the move by White followed by the move by Black. If there is no appropriate move by White to use (e.g. if the moves are interrupted by commentary) then an ellipsis ("…") is used in its place.

As with algebraic notation, editorial comment may be added to a move by the use of annotation symbols.

== History ==
In the earliest chess literature, natural language was used to describe moves. This is the ultimate source of all forms of descriptive notation. Over time, abbreviations became common, and a system of notation gradually evolved. For example, the common opening move 1.e4 was originally recorded as "Pawn to King's Fourth" or similar; by the time of Howard Staunton's The Chess-Player's Handbook (1847), this had been abbreviated to "P. to K's 4th."which was later further reduced to "P–K4".

== Comparison to algebraic notation ==
While descriptive notation is largely regarded as obsolete, it does have a few minor advantages over algebraic notation. By identifying each square with reference to the player on move, descriptive notation better reflects the symmetry of the game's starting position (e.g. "both players opened with P–QB4 and planned to play B–KN2 as soon as possible"). Generic descriptions which refer to all four sectors of the board are also possible, e.g. "all four bishops were developed on N2." Maxims such as "a pawn on the seventh is worth two on the fifth" make sense from both players' perspectives. Because the type of each captured piece is specified, it is easier to visualize the material balance at any point in the game when skimming over a game score.

On the other hand, algebraic notation has several advantages. The notation for any given move is almost always more concise in algebraic notation than in descriptive notation; this can reduce the length of chess books and magazines by several pages. While confusion can arise in descriptive notation because each square has two names, no such problem exists in algebraic notation. Algebraic notation specifies a capturing piece's destination square; meanwhile, because unambiguous captures lack coordinate information in descriptive notation, visualization is more taxing, since it requires remembering exactly which pieces are attacking which.

== Example ==
The following game scores show the Evergreen Game.

English descriptive notation:

1. P–K4 P–K4
2. N–KB3 N–QB3
3. B–B4 B–B4
4. P–QN4 B×NP
5. P–B3 B–R4
6. P–Q4 P×P
7. O–O P–Q6
8. Q–N3 Q–B3
9. P–K5 Q–N3
10. R–K1 KN–K2
11. B–R3 P–N4
12. Q×P R–QN1
13. Q–R4 B–N3
14. QN–Q2 B–N2
15. N–K4 Q–B4
16. B×QP Q–R4
17. N–B6 ch P×N
18. P×P R–N1
19. QR–Q1 Q×N
20. R×N ch N×R
21. Q×P ch K×Q
22. B–B5 dbl ch K–K1
23. B–Q7 ch K–B1
24. B×N mate

English descriptive notation with variants:

1. P–K4 P–K4
2. Kt–KB3 Kt–QB3
3. B–B4 B–B4
4. P–QKt4 B×KtP
5. P–B3 B–R4
6. P–Q4 P×P
7. Castles P–Q6
8. Q–Kt3 Q–B3
9. P–K5 Q–Kt3
10. R–K.Sq. KKt–K2
11. B–R3 P–Kt4
12. Q×P R–QKt.Sq.
13. Q–R4 B–Kt3
14. QKt–Q2 B–Kt2
15. Kt–K4 Q–B4
16. B×QP Q–R4
17. Kt–B6+ P×Kt
18. P×P R–Kt.Sq.
19. QR–Q.Sq. Q×Kt
20. R×Kt+ Kt×R
21. Q×P+ K×Q
22. B–B5+ K–K.Sq.
23. B–Q7+ K–B.Sq.
24. B×Kt++

Spanish descriptive notation:

1. P4R P4R
2. C3AR C3AD
3. A4A A4A
4. P4CD AxP
5. P3A A4T
6. P4D P×P
7. O-O P6D
8. D3C D3A
9. P5R D3C
10. T1R CR2R
11. A3T P4C
12. DxP T1CD
13. D4T A3C
14. CD2D A2C
15. C4R D4A
16. AxPD D4T
17. C6A+ P×C
18. P×P T1C
19. TD1D DxC
20. TxC+ CxT
21. DxP+ R×D
22. A5A+ R1R
23. A7D+ R1A
24. AxC++

Algebraic notation:

1. e4 e5
2. Nf3 Nc6
3. Bc4 Bc5
4. b4 Bxb4
5. c3 Ba5
6. d4 exd4
7. 0-0 d3
8. Qb3 Qf6
9. e5 Qg6
10. Re1 Nge7
11. Ba3 b5
12. Qxb5 Rb8
13. Qa4 Bb6
14. Nbd2 Bb7
15. Ne4 Qf5
16. Bxd3 Qh5
17. Nf6+ gxf6
18. exf6 Rg8
19. Rad1 Qxf3
20. Rxe7+ Nxe7
21. Qxd7+ Kxd7
22. Bf5+ Ke8
23. Bd7+ Kf8
24. Bxe7#
Scorecards from a 1931 tournament demonstrating variations in descriptive notation.

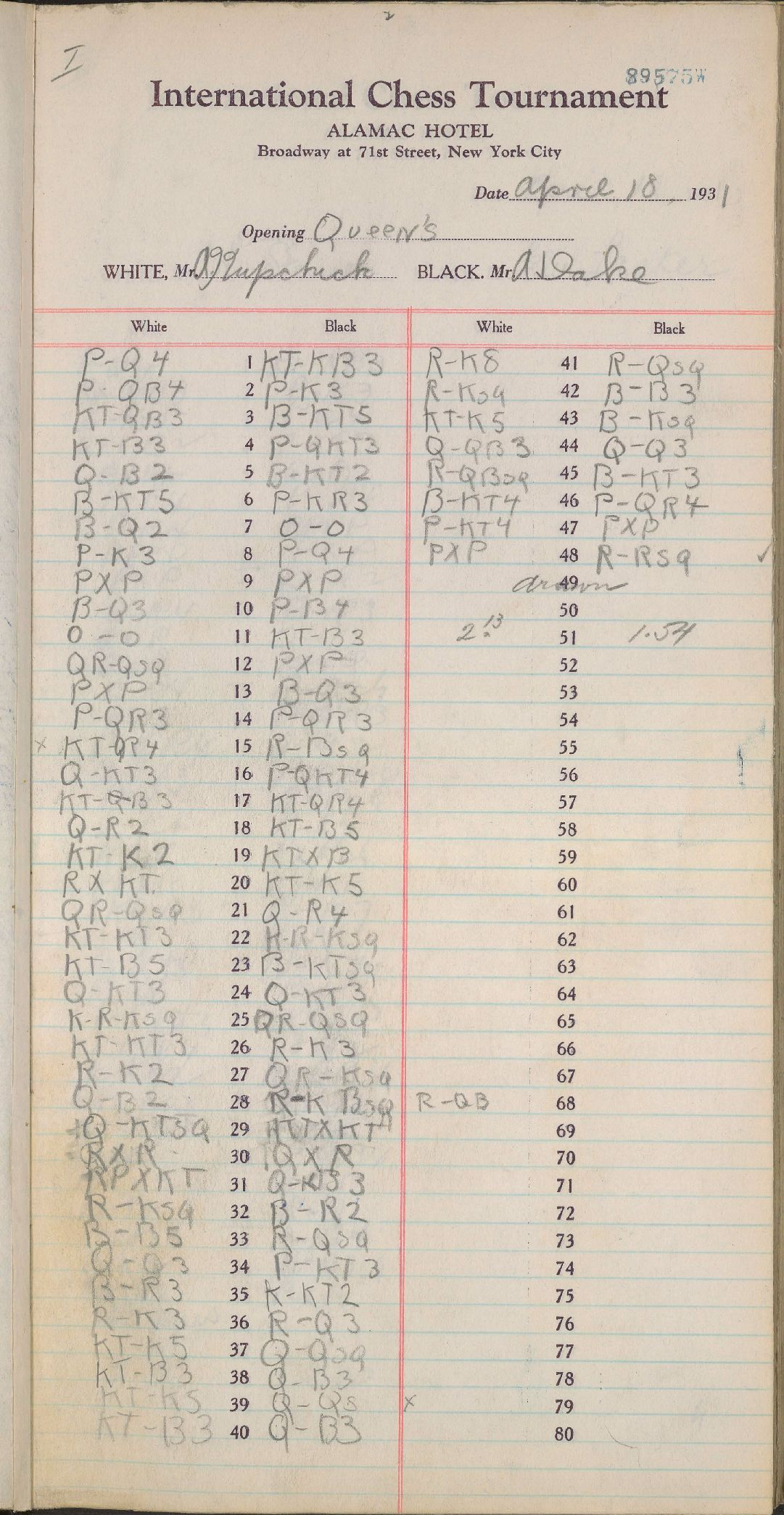
This player uses "KT" for knight, and "sq" for the first rank.

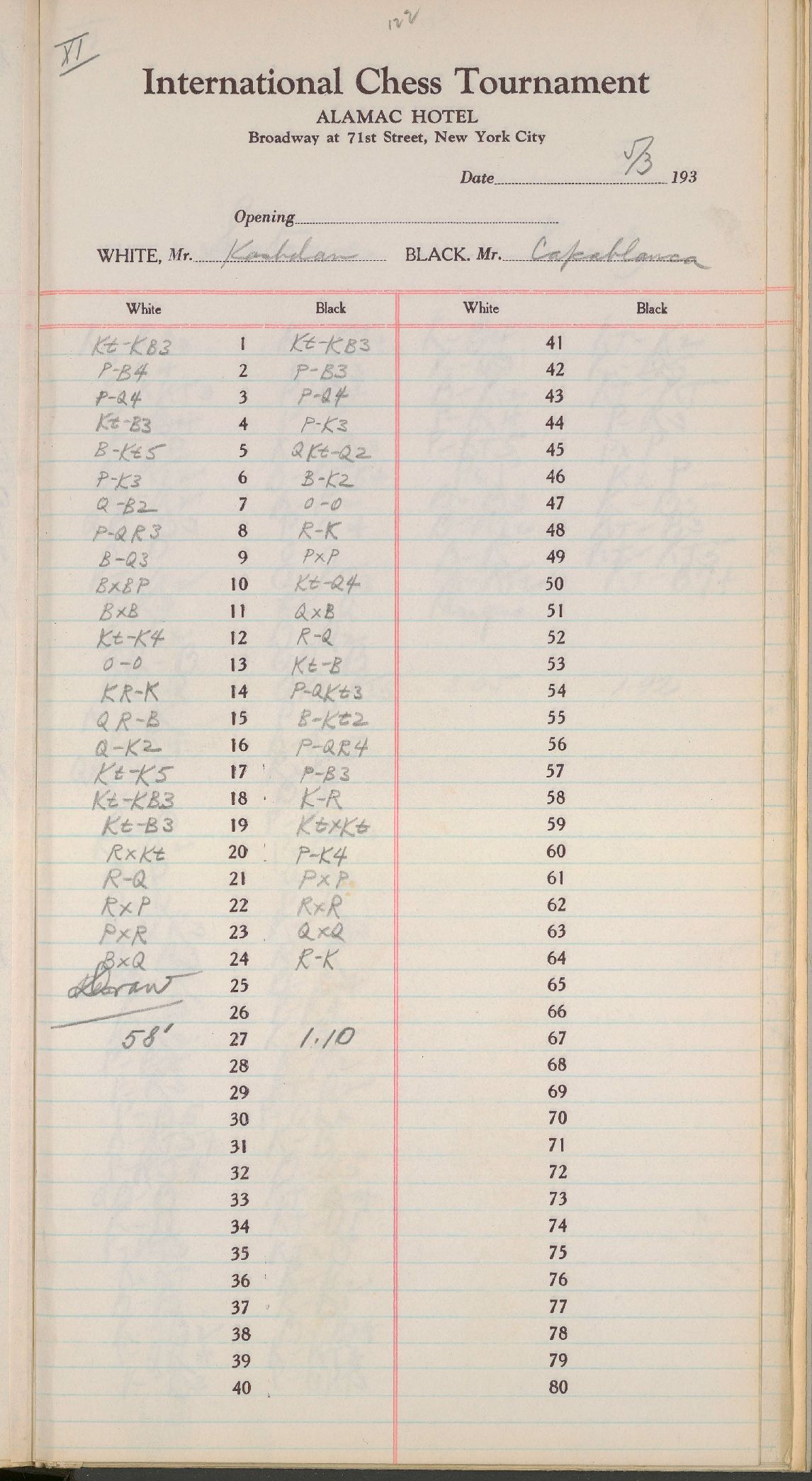
This player writes "Knight to Bishop's square" as Kt–B and "King's Rook to King 1" as KR–K.

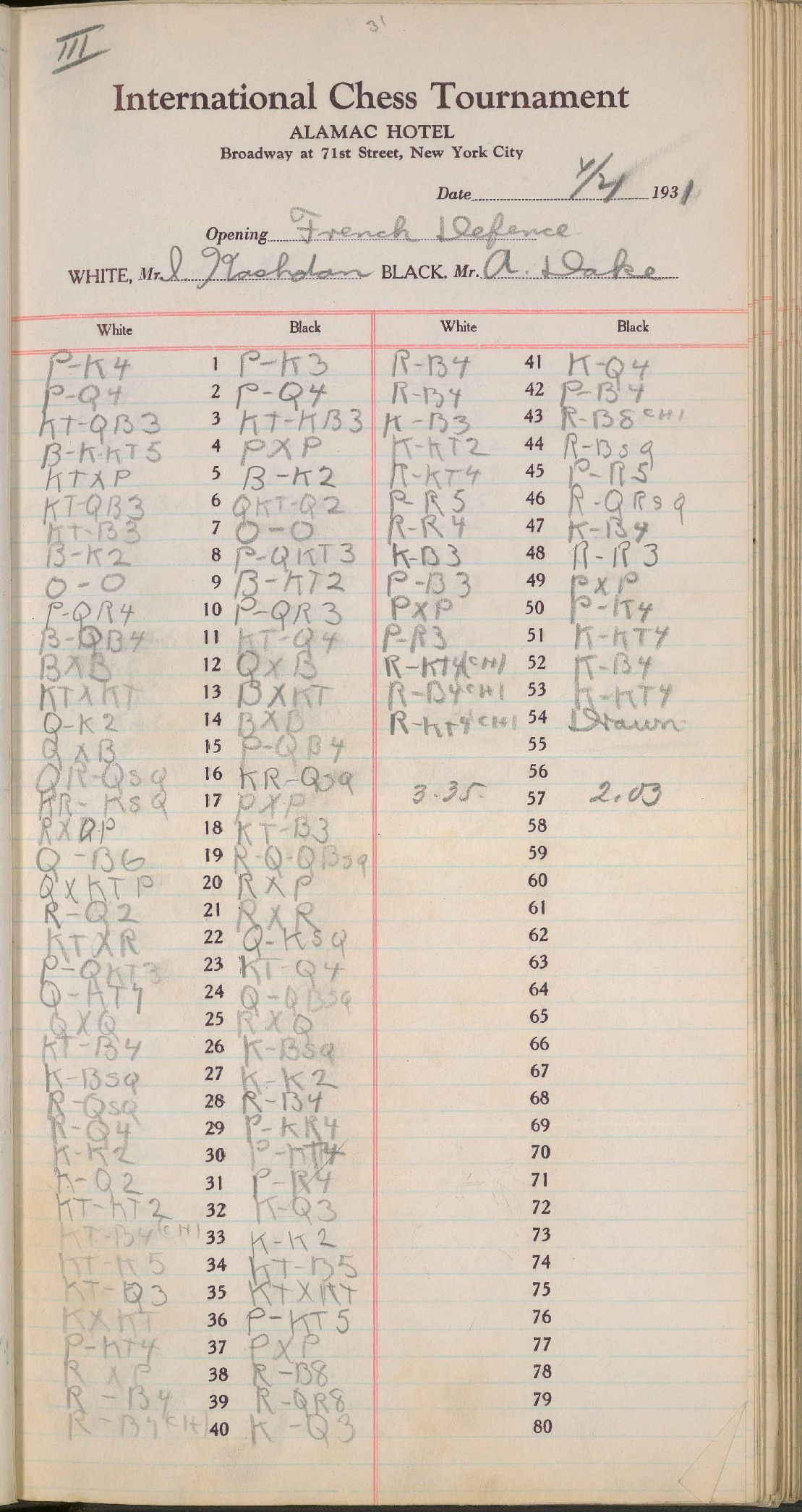
This player writes check as (CH). On one occasion, "Rook on Queen's square to Queen's Bishop's square" is written R–Q–QBsq.

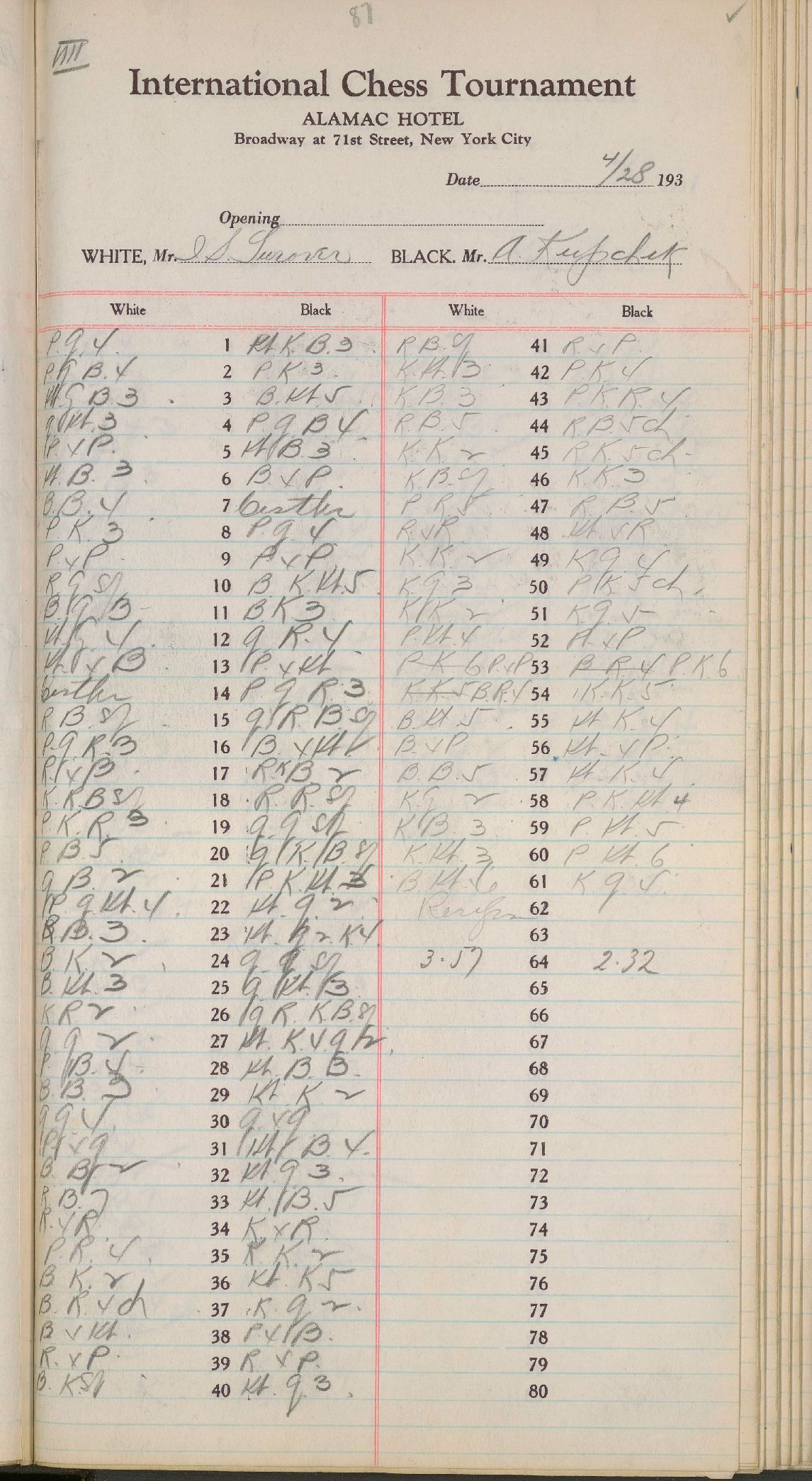
This player uses dots instead of dashes, so "Pawn to Queen 4" is P. Q. 4. He also denotes castling as Castles.
