= Libro de la invencion liberal y arte del juego del axedrez =

16th-century book on chess

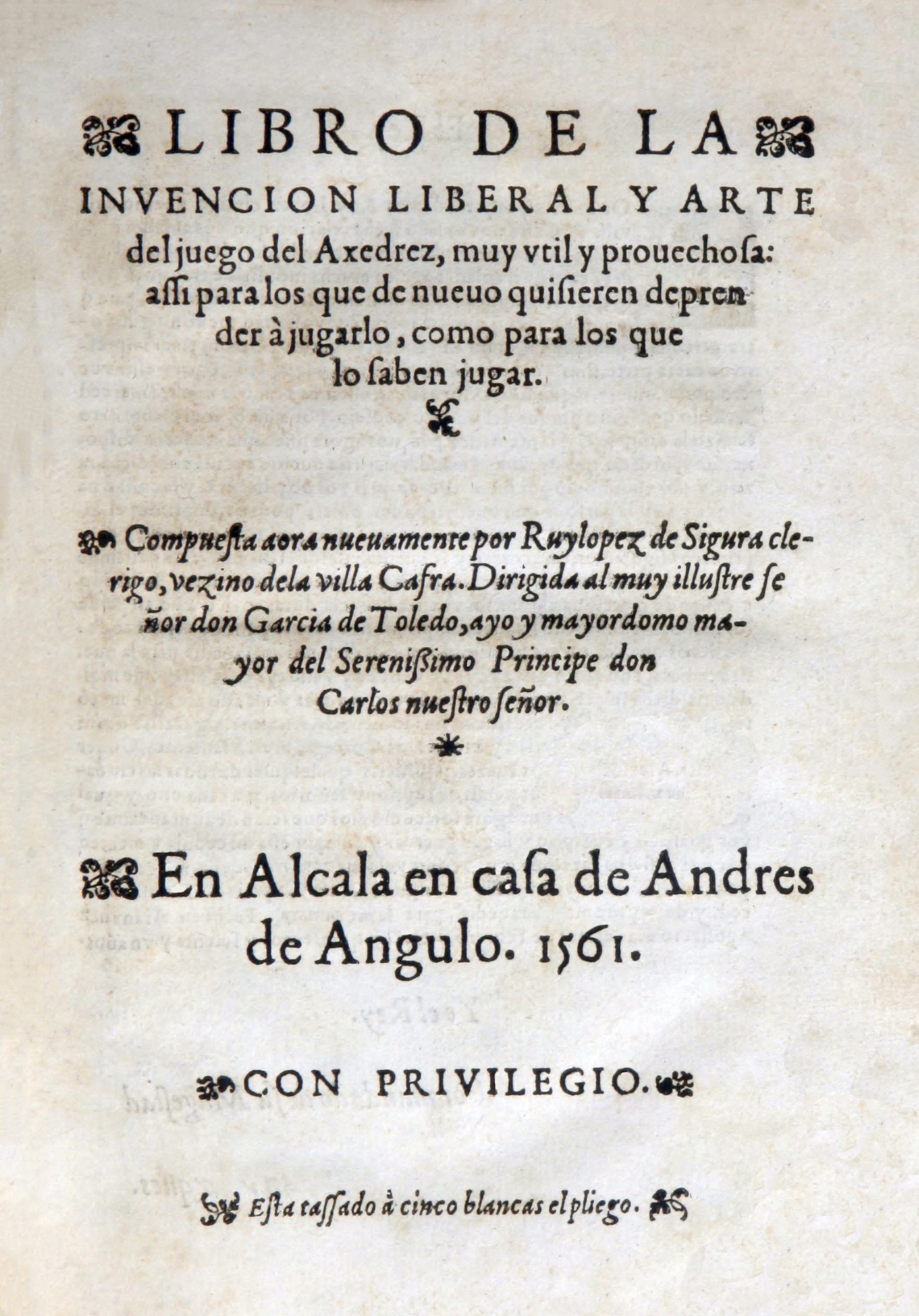
Title page

Libro de la invencion liberal y arte del juego del axedrez (translation: "Book of the liberal invention and art of the game of chess") is one of the first books published about modern chess in Europe, after Pedro Damiano's 1512 book. It was written by Spanish priest Ruy López de Segura in 1561 and published in Alcalá de Henares.

== Details ==
In 1560 Ruy López visited Rome and read Damiano's book, which he found unsatisfactory. López's book contains general chess advice, rules of the game, and a discussion of the origin of the game. It also recommends some chess openings, and criticizes Damiano's games and analysis. The book was translated to Italian in 1584 and to French in the 17th century.

The book consists of four parts. The first part talks generally about chess, discusses the history, and gives the rules that were used in Spain at the time: stalemate was a win for the player not stalemated and a player could also win by capturing all of the opponent's pieces (except for the king). The book also introduced the fifty-move rule. In the second part, López introduces the word gambit and gives some openings that had not been previously published: the King's Gambit, some variations of the Bishop's Opening, and what is now known as the Steinitz Defense in the Ruy Lopez. The last two parts of the book are critical of the games of Damiano. After the moves 1.e4 e5 2.Nf3, Damiano thought that 2...Nc6 was Black's best move. López considered that inferior because of 3.Bb5. This opening is now known as the Ruy Lopez, although he did not invent it.

== Influence ==
Jorge Luis Borges references "Libro de la invencion..." in his short story, "Pierre Menard, Author of the Quixote". It is the seventh entry in a list of Pierre Menard's lifework as compiled by the fictional author of Borges' story. Pierre Menard's contribution to the text was, "a translation, with introduction and notes...".

== See also ==
- Libro de los juegos
