= Chess notation =

Methods for describing chess moves and/or positions

Chess notation systems are used to record either the moves made or the position of the pieces in a game of chess. Algebraic notation is the standard method of chess notation used for recording and describing moves. It is the only form of notation recognized by International Chess Federation, the international chess governing body.

Chess notation is used in chess literature, and by players keeping a record of an ongoing game. The earliest systems of notation used lengthy narratives to describe each move; these gradually evolved into more compact notation systems. Algebraic notation is now the accepted international standard, with several variants. Descriptive chess notation was used in English- and Spanish-language literature until the late 20th century, but is now obsolescent. Portable Game Notation (PGN) is a text file format based on English algebraic notation which can be processed by most chess software. Other notation systems include ICCF numeric notation, used for international correspondence chess, and systems for transmission using Morse code over telegraph or radio. The standard system for recording chess positions is Forsyth–Edwards Notation.

== Notation systems ==
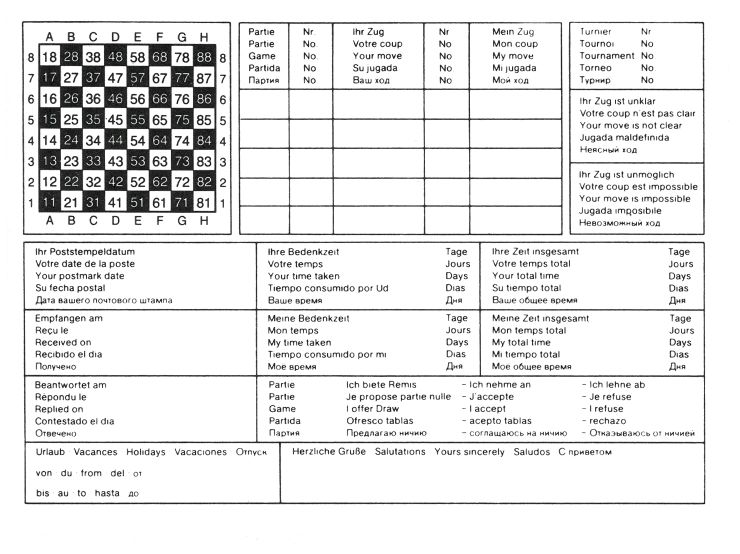
Correspondence chess card showing algebraic notation and ICCF notation

In organized competition, both players are required to keep a record of the moves played on a score sheet. If required, score sheets may be used to resolve disputes, for example about whether an illegal move has been made or whether a threefold repetition has occurred. In addition, if the time control requires the players to complete a specified number of moves in a specified time, an accurate count of the moves must be kept. All chess coaches strongly recommend the recording of one's games so that one can look for improvements in one's play.

- Algebraic notation is the most widely used method for recording moves. It is based on a system of coordinates (a–h for files, 1–8 for ranks) to uniquely identify each square. In embryonic form it was used by Philip Stamma in the 1737 book Essai sur le jeu des echecs. It was later adopted (in long form) by the influential Handbuch des Schachspiels and became standard in German publications. It is more compact and less prone to error than the English descriptive system. Algebraic notation is the official notation of FIDE; if a player records the game in a different notation system, their scoresheet may not be used as evidence in the event of a dispute. The U.S. Chess Federation prefers the use of algebraic notation but still permits descriptive notation. While short algebraic notation is the most common, there are several variants, including:

- Long algebraic notation includes the starting file and rank of the piece.
- Short algebraic notation omits the starting file and rank of the piece, unless it is necessary to disambiguate the move.
- Minimal algebraic notation is similar to short algebraic notation but omits the indicators for capture ("x"), en passant capture ("e.p."), check ("+") and checkmate ("#"). It was used by Chess Informant.
- Figurine algebraic notation replaces the letter that stands for a piece by its symbol, e.g., ♞c6 instead of Nc6 or ♖xg4 instead of Rxg4. Pawns are omitted as in standard algebraic notation. This style is widely used in chess literature to allow the moves to be read independent of language. To display or print these symbols on a computer, one or more fonts with good Unicode support must be installed, and the document (web page, word processor document, etc.) must use one of these fonts. For more information see Chess symbols in Unicode.
- Reversible algebraic notation is based on long algebraic notation, but adds an additional letter for the piece that was captured, if any. The move can be reversed by moving the piece to its original square, and restoring the captured piece. For example, Rd2xBd6.
- Concise reversible algebraic notation is similar to reversible algebraic notation, but omits the file or rank if it is not needed to disambiguate the move. For example, Rd2xB6. This notation is recommended by Gene Milener in Play Stronger Chess by Examining Chess 960: Usable Strategies for Fischer Random Chess Discovered.
- Figurine concise reversible algebraic notation is a form of concise reversible algebraic notation with non-Staunton figurines, used by Gene Milener during Chess960 tournaments.
- Smith notation or Coordinate notation specifies the source square (rather than the piece moving), destination square, and what piece was captured, if any.

- Descriptive notation was the prevalent notation in English-speaking countries until the late 1970s. In this system, files are named after the piece that is initially on the back rank, and each square has two names depending on whether it is from White's or Black's point of view. In descriptive notation, the common opening move 1.e4 is rendered as 1. P―K4 ("pawn to king four"). This is still used by a dwindling number of mainly older players, and knowledge of descriptive notation is necessary to study older chess books. Similar systems were used in other languages, including Spanish and French.
- ICCF numeric notation, also known as Koch notation. In international correspondence chess the use of algebraic notation may cause confusion, since different languages have different names for the pieces and some players may be unfamiliar with the Latin alphabet. The traditional standard for transmitting moves in this form of chess is ICCF numeric notation, in which files are represented by numbers rather than letters and the source and destination squares are indicated. For example the common opening move 1.e4 is represented as 1.5254.With widespread availability of the internet, the majority of correspondence games are now played on servers, and the use of ICCF numeric notation is in decline.

The following table lists examples of the same moves in some of the notations which may be used by humans. Each table cell contains White's move followed by Black's move, as they are listed in a single line of written notation.

Chess notation examples
Algebraic	Figurine algebraic	Long algebraic	Reversible algebraic	Concise reversible	Smith	Descriptive	Coordinate	ICCF
e4 e5	e4 e5	e2e4 e7e5	e2-e4 e7-e5	e24 e75	e2e4 e7e5	P-K4 P-K4	E2-E4 E7-E5	5254 5755
Nf3 Nc6	♘f3 ♞c6	Ng1f3 Nb8c6	Ng1-f3 Nb8-c6	Ng1f3 Nb8c6	g1f3 b8c6	N-KB3 N-QB3	G1-F3 B8-C6	7163 2836
Bb5 a6	♗b5 a6	Bf1b5 a7a6	Bf1-b5 a7-a6	Bf1b5 a76	f1b5 a7a6	B-N5 P-QR3	F1-B5 A7-A6	6125 1716
Bxc6 dxc6	♗xc6 dxc6	Bb5xc6 d7xc6	Bb5xNc6 d7xBc6	Bb5:Nc6 d7:Bc6	b5c6n d7c6b	BxN QPxB	B5-C6 D7-C6	2536 4736
d3 Bb4+	d3 ♝b4+	d2d3 Bf8b4+	d2-d3 Bf8-b4+	d23 Bf8b4+	d2d3 f8b4	P-Q3 B-N5ch	D2-D3 F8-B4	4243 6824
Nc3 Nf6	♘c3 ♞f6	Nb1c3 Ng8f6	Nb1-c3 Ng8-f6	Nb1c3 Ng8f6	b1c3 g8f6	N-B3 N-B3	B1-C3 G8-F6	2133 7866
0-0 Bxc3	0-0 ♝xc3	0-0 Bb4xc3	0-0 Bb4xNc3	0-0 Bb4:Nc3	e1g1c b4c3n	0-0 BxN	E1-G1 B4-C3	5171 2433

In all forms of notation, the result is usually indicated at the conclusion of the game by either "1–0", indicating that White won, "0–1" indicating that Black won or "½–½", indicating a draw. Moves that result in checkmate can be marked with "#", "++", "≠", or "‡" to indicate the end of game and the winner, instead of or in addition to "1–0" or "0–1".

Annotators commenting on a game frequently use question marks ("?") and exclamation marks ("!") to label a move as bad or praise the move as a good one (see Chess annotation symbols).

=== Notation systems for computers ===
The following are commonly used for chess-related computer systems (in addition to Coordinate and Smith notation, which are described above):

- Portable Game Notation (PGN). This is a text-based file format in which chess moves are recorded with standard English algebraic notation with a small amount of markup to record the players and circumstances of the game. Most chess software is configured to process PGN files.
- Steno-Chess. This is another format suitable for computer processing. It sacrifices the ability to play through games (by a human) for conciseness, which minimises the number of characters required to store a game.
- Forsyth–Edwards Notation (FEN). A single line format which gives the current positions of pieces on a board, to enable generation of a board in something other than the initial array of pieces. It also contains other information such as castling rights, move number, and color on move. It is incorporated into the PGN standard as a Tag Pair in conjunction with the SetUp tag.
- Extended Position Description (EPD). Another format which gives the current positions of a board, with an extended set of structured attribute values using the ASCII character set. It is intended for data and command interchange among chess playing programs. It is also intended for the representation of portable opening library repositories. It is better than FEN for certain chess variants, such as Chess960.

=== Notation for telegraph and radio ===
Some special methods of notation were used for transmitting moves by telegraph or radio, usually using Morse Code. The Uedemann code and Gringmuth notation worked by using a two-letter label for each square and transmitting four letters – two letters for the origin square followed by two letters for the destination square. Castling is shown as a king move. Squares are designated from White's side of the board, files from left to right and ranks from nearest to farthest. The Rutherford code first converted the move into a number and then converted the move number into a composite Latin word. It could also transmit moves of two games at the same time.

==== Uedemann code ====
This code was devised by Louis Uedemann (1854–1912). The method was never actually used, mainly because a transposition of letters can result in a valid but incorrect move. Many sources incorrectly use this name for the Gringmuth code.

The files are labeled "A", "E", "I", "O", "O", "I", "E", and "A". The ranks are labeled "B", "D", "F", "G", "H", "K", "L", and "P". A square on the queenside is designated by its file letter and then its rank letter. A square on the kingside is designated by its rank letter then its file letter.

==== Gringmuth notation ====
This method was invented by Dmitry Alexeyevich Gringmuth but it is sometimes incorrectly called the Uedemann Code. It was used as early as 1866. Files were designated with one of two letters, depending on whether it was on White's side or Black's side. These letters were: files 'B', 'C', 'D', 'F', 'G', 'H', 'K', and 'L' for White-side ranks 'A', 'E', 'I', 'O', corresponding to algebraic files 'a', 'b', ... 'h', and ranks 1, 2, 3, 4; the aligned Black-side ranks were 'M', 'N', 'P', 'R', 'S', 'T', 'W', and 'Z', corresponding to algebraic 'a' ... 'h', used for Gringmuth ranks 'O', 'I', 'E', and 'A' corresponding to algebraic ranks 5, 6, 7, 8. Hence square 'a1' in algebraic notation is Gringmuth 'BA', and its diagonal opposite 'h8' is Gringmuth 'ZA'. A king's pawn opening 'e2e4' in algebraic would be 'GEGO' in Gringmuth, with a mirrored response by black 'e7e5' notated as 'SESO'.

==== Rutherford code ====
This code was invented in 1880 by Sir William Watson Rutherford (1853–1927). At the time, the British Post Office did not allow digits or ciphers in telegrams, but they did allow Latin words. This method also allowed moves for two games to be transmitted at the same time. In this method, the legal moves in the position were counted using a system until the move being made was reached. This was done for both games. The move number of the first game was multiplied by 60 and added to the move number of the second game. Leading zeros were added as necessary to give a four-digit number. The first two digits would be 00 through 39, which corresponded to a table of 40 Latin roots. The third digit corresponded to a list of 10 Latin prefixes and the last digit corresponded to a list of 10 Latin suffixes. The resulting word was transmitted.

After rules were changed so that ciphers were allowed in telegrams, this system was replaced by the Gringmuth Notation.

== Recording positions ==
Positions are usually shown as diagrams (images), using the symbols shown here for the pieces.

There is also a notation for recording positions in text format, called the Forsyth–Edwards notation (FEN). This is useful for adjourning a game to resume later or for conveying chess problem positions without a diagram. A position can also be recorded by listing the pieces and the squares they reside on, for example: White: Ke1, Rd3, etc.

== Endgame classification ==
There are also systems for classifying types of endgames. See Chess endgame § Endgame classification for more details.

== History ==
Page from 1841 Chess Player's Chronicle. In modern algebraic notation, this would be written as 1.e4 e5 2.Bc4 Bc5 3.b4 Bxb4 4.f4 d5 5.exd5 Nf6 6.fxe5 Nxd5 7.Nf3 Bg4 8.0-0 0-0 9.c3 Ba5 10.Ba3 Re8 11.Qb3 Bxf3 12.Rxf3 Bb6+ 13.d4 Rxe5 14.Nd2 Nc6 15.Kh1 Na5 16.Qc2 Nxc4 17.Nxc4 Rh5 18.Ne5 Nxc3 19.Nxf7 Qxd4 20.Rg1 c5 21.Rxc3 Bc7 22.h3 b6 23.Rf3 Qd5 24.Bb2 g5 25.Qc3 Qd4 26.Qb3 c4 27.Qb4 Qc5 28.Qc3 Be5 29.Nxe5 1–0

The notation for chess moves evolved slowly, as these examples show. The last is in algebraic chess notation; the others show the evolution of descriptive chess notation and use spelling and notation of the period.

1614: The white king commands his owne knight into the third house before his owne bishop.

1750: K. knight to His Bishop's 3d.

1837: K.Kt. to B.third sq.

1848: K.Kt. to B's 3rd.

1859: K. Kt. to B. 3d.

1874: K Kt to B3

1889: KKt-B3

1904: Kt-KB3

1946: N-KB3

Modern: Nf3

A text from Shakespeare's time uses complete sentences to describe moves, for example, "Then the black king for his second draught brings forth his queene, and placest her in the third house, in front of his bishop's pawne", which nowadays would be written simply as 2...Qf6. The great 18th-century player Philidor used an almost equally verbose approach in his influential book Analyse du jeu des Échecs, for example, "The king's bishop, at his queen bishop's fourth square."

Algebraic chess notation was first used by Philipp Stamma (c. 1705–1755) in an almost fully developed form, before the now-obsolete descriptive chess notation evolved. The main difference between Stamma's system and the modern system is that Stamma used "p" for pawn moves and the original file of the piece ("a" through "h") instead of the initial letter of the piece. In London in 1747, Philidor convincingly defeated Stamma in a match. Consequently, his writings (which were translated into English) became more influential than Stamma's in the English-speaking chess world; this may have led to the adoption of a descriptive system for writing chess moves, rather than Stamma's coordinate-based approach. However, algebraic notation became popular in Europe following its adoption by the highly influential Handbuch des Schachspiels, and became dominant in Europe during the 20th century. It did not become popular in the English-speaking countries, however, until the 1970s.

== See also ==
- Algebraic notation (chess)
- Chess opening theory table
- Chess symbols in Unicode
- Board game record
