= Castling =

Chess move

Position: a8 black rook, c8 black circle, e8 black king, g8 black circle, h8 black rook, a1 white rook, c1 white circle, e1 white king, g1 white circle, h1 white rook

Initial positions of kings and rooks. Kings may castle to the indicated squares.

Position: c8 black king, d8 black rook, h8 black rook, a1 white rook, f1 white rook, g1 white king

White has castled kingside; Black has castled queenside.

Castling is a move in chess. It consists of moving the king two squares toward a rook on the same rank and then moving the rook to the square that the king passed over. (Note: Article 3.8.2 in FIDE Laws of Chess) Castling is permitted only if neither the king nor the rook has previously moved; the squares between the king and the rook are vacant; and the king does not leave, cross over, or finish on a square attacked by an enemy piece. Castling is the only move in chess in which two pieces are moved at once.

Castling with the king's rook is called kingside castling, and castling with the queen's rook is called queenside castling. In both algebraic and descriptive notations, castling kingside is written as 0-0 and castling queenside as 0-0-0.

Castling originates from the king's leap, a two-square king move added to European chess between the 14th and 15th centuries, and took on its present form in the 17th century. Local variations in castling rules were common, however, persisting in Italy until the late 19th century. Castling does not exist in Asian games of the chess family, such as shogi, xiangqi, and janggi, but it commonly appears in variants of Western chess.

== Rules ==
=== Description ===
During castling, the king is shifted two squares toward a rook of the same color on the same rank, and the rook is transferred to the square crossed by the king. There are two forms of castling:

- Castling kingside (short castling) consists of moving the king to g1 and the rook to f1 for White, or moving the king to g8 and the rook to f8 for Black.
- Castling queenside (long castling) consists of moving the king to c1 and the rook to d1 for White, or moving the king to c8 and the rook to d8 for Black.

=== Requirements ===
Position: e8 black king, a1 white rook, b1 white knight, e1 white king, h1 white rook

White cannot castle queenside because the knight is in the way. White can castle kingside.

Position: a8 black rook, e8 black king, h8 black rook, g6 white bishop, e1 white king

Black cannot castle on either side because the black king is in check by the white bishop.

Position: e8 black king, c6 black queen, a1 white rook, e1 white king, h1 white rook

White cannot castle queenside because Black's queen controls c1. White can castle kingside even though the h1-rook is under attack.

Position: a8 black rook, e8 black king, h8 black rook, f4 white queen, e1 white king

Black cannot castle kingside because the white queen attacks f8. Black can castle queenside despite the white queen's attack on b8.

Castling is permitted provided all of the following conditions are met: (Note: Article 3.8.2 in FIDE Laws of Chess)

1. Neither the king nor the rook has previously moved.
2. There are no pieces between the king and the rook.
3. The king is not currently in check.
4. The king does not pass through or finish on a square that is attacked by an enemy piece.

Conditions 3 and 4 can be summarized by the mnemonic: A player may not castle out of, through, or into check.

Castling rules often cause confusion, even occasionally among high-level players. Alexander Beliavsky and Viktor Korchnoi both had to consult the arbiter during tournaments on whether castling was legal when the rook was on or passed over an attacked square, Yuri Averbakh once mistakenly thought that Black queenside castling was illegal when b8 was attacked, and Nigel Short once attempted to castle queenside as Black when d8 was under attack (this was not allowed). Illegal castling has also occasionally occurred in serious games between top players (including Gata Kamsky, Viktor Korchnoi, and Richard Réti) when they forgot that the king or rook had previously moved and returned to its home square, and has not always been noticed by the opponent. Yasser Seirawan once accidentally castled queenside as White with his queen's rook on b1 (which was not allowed), and Alexander Alekhine once "castled his queen" (moving his queen from d1 to b1 and his rook from a1 to c1, which was also not allowed). To clarify:

- The rook can be under attack.
- The rook can pass through an attacked square. (White can castle queenside even if Black is attacking b1; Black can castle queenside even if White is attacking b8.)
- The king can have been in check earlier in the game.

=== Tournament rules ===
Under FIDE rules and USCF rules, and enforced in most tournaments, castling is considered a king move, so the king must be touched first; if the rook is touched first, a rook move must be played instead. As usual, the player may choose another legal destination square for the king until releasing it. When the two-square king move is completed, however, the player is committed to castling if it is legal, and the rook must be moved accordingly. The entire move must be completed with one hand. A player who attempts to castle illegally must return the king and rook to their original squares and then make a legal king move if possible (which may include castling on the other side). If there is no legal king move, the touch-move rule does not apply to the rook.

These tournament rules are not commonly enforced in informal play nor commonly known by casual players.

=== Castling rights ===
An unmoved king has castling rights with an unmoved rook of the same color on the same rank, even if castling is not legal in that particular position. In the context of threefold and fivefold repetition, two otherwise identical positions with different castling rights are considered to be different positions.

Karpov vs. Miles, 1986

Position: a8 black rook, e8 black king, f8 black bishop, h8 black rook, f7 black pawn, g7 black pawn, h7 black pawn, e6 black pawn, b5 white knight, e4 white pawn, a2 white pawn, b2 black knight, d2 white bishop, e2 white king, g2 white pawn, h2 white pawn, a1 white rook, h1 white rook

Position after 22.Nb5

In a 1986 game between Anatoly Karpov and Tony Miles, play continued from the diagrammed position as follows:

22... Ra4 23. Nc3 Ra8 24. Nb5 Ra4 25. Nc3 Ra8 26. Nb5

With his 26th move, Karpov attempted to claim a draw by threefold repetition, thinking that the positions after his 22nd, 24th, and 26th moves were the same. It was pointed out to him, however, that the position after his 22nd move had different castling rights than the positions after his 24th and 26th moves (the rook being unmoved prior to 22...Ra4, meaning Black still had castling rights in that position), rendering his claim illegal. As a result, Karpov was penalized five minutes on his clock. After thinking for about ten minutes, Miles decided to agree to a draw anyway (even an incorrect claim of threefold repetition is also a draw offer).

== Notation ==
Both algebraic notation and descriptive notation indicate kingside castling as 0-0 and queenside castling as 0-0-0 (using the digit zero). Portable Game Notation and some publications use O-O for kingside castling and O-O-O for queenside castling (using the letter O) instead. ICCF numeric notation indicates castling based on the starting and ending squares of the king; thus, castling kingside is written as 5171 for White and 5878 for Black, and castling queenside is written as 5131 for White and 5838 for Black.

== History ==
Position: b8 black cross, c8 black circle, e8 black king, g8 black circle, h8 black cross, a7 black cross, c7 black circle, d6 black circle, e6 black circle, f6 black circle, d3 white circle, e3 white circle, f3 white circle, a2 white cross, c2 white circle, b1 white cross, c1 white circle, e1 white king, g1 white circle, h1 white cross

Castling under medieval rules. Symbol color corresponds to king color. Circles represent English, Spanish, French, and Lombardy movement; crosses represent Lombardy movement only.

Castling has its roots in the king's leap. There were two forms of the leap: the king would move once like a knight, or the king would move two squares on its first move. The knight move might be used early in the game to get the king to safety or later in the game to escape a threat. This second form was played in Europe as early as the 13th century. In North Africa, the king was transferred to a safe square by a two-move procedure: the king moved to the player's second rank, and the rook and king moved to each other's original squares.

Various forms of castling were developed due to the spread of rulesets during the 15th and 16th centuries which increased the power of the queen and bishop, allowing these pieces to attack from a distance and from both sides of the board, thus increasing the importance of king safety.

The rule of castling has varied by location and time. In medieval England, Spain, and France, the white king was allowed to jump to c1, c2, d3, e3, f3, or g1 if no capture was made and the king was not in check and did not move over check; the black king might move analogously. In Lombardy, the white king might also jump to a2, b1, or h1, with corresponding squares applying to the black king. Later, in Germany and Italy, the rule was changed such that the king move was accompanied by a pawn move.

In the Göttingen manuscript (c. 1500) and a game published by Luis Ramírez de Lucena in 1498, castling consisted of moving the rook and then moving the king on separate moves.

The current version of castling was established in France in 1620 and in England in 1640. It served to combine the rook's move and the king's jumping move into a single move.

In Rome, from the early 17th century until the late 19th century, the rook might be placed on any square up to and including the king's square, and the king might be moved to any square on the other side of the rook. This was called free castling.

In the 1811 edition of his chess treatise, Johann Allgaier introduced the 0-0 notation. He differentiated between 0-0r (right) and 0-0l (left). The 0-0-0 notation for queenside castling was introduced in 1837 by Aaron Alexandre. The practice was adopted in the first edition (1843) of the influential Handbuch des Schachspiels and soon became standard. In English descriptive notation, the word "Castles" was originally spelled out, adding "K's R" or "Q's R" if disambiguation was needed; eventually, the 0-0 and 0-0-0 notation was borrowed from the algebraic system.

== Strategic and tactical concepts ==
=== Strategy ===
Position: a8 black rook, d8 black queen, f8 black rook, g8 black king, a7 black pawn, b7 black pawn, d7 black bishop, e7 black pawn, f7 black pawn, g7 black bishop, h7 black pawn, c6 black knight, d6 black pawn, f6 black knight, g6 black pawn, c4 white bishop, d4 white knight, e4 white pawn, c3 white knight, e3 white bishop, f3 white pawn, a2 white pawn, b2 white pawn, c2 white pawn, d2 white queen, g2 white pawn, h2 white pawn, c1 white king, d1 white rook, h1 white rook

Position after 10.0-0-0: Opposite castling in the Yugoslav Attack

Castling is generally an important goal in the opening: it moves the king to safety away from the center files of the board, and it moves the rook to a more active position (the f-file if castling kingside; the d-file if castling queenside).

The choice regarding to which side one castles often hinges on an assessment of the trade-off between king safety and activity of the rook. Kingside castling is generally slightly safer because the king ends up closer to the edge of the board and can usually defend all of the pawns on the castled side. In queenside castling, the king is placed closer to the center and does not defend the pawn on the a-file; for these reasons, the king is often subsequently moved to the b-file. In addition, queenside castling is initially obstructed by more pieces than kingside castling, thus taking longer to set up than kingside castling. On the other hand, queenside castling places the rook more efficiently on the central d-file, where it is often immediately active; meanwhile, with kingside castling, a tempo may be required to move the rook to a more effective square.

Players may forgo castling for various reasons. In positions where the opponent cannot organize an attack against a centralized king, castling may be unnecessary or even detrimental. In addition, in certain situations, a rook can be more active near the edges of the board than in the center; for example, if it is able to fight for control of an open or semi-open file.

Kingside castling occurs more frequently than queenside castling. It is common for both players to castle kingside, less common for one player to castle kingside and the other queenside, and uncommon for both players to castle queenside. If one player castles kingside and the other queenside, it is called opposite castling or opposite-side castling. Castling on opposite sides usually results in a fierce fight, as each player's pawns are free to advance to attack the opponent's castled position without exposing the player's own castled king. Opposite castling is a common feature of many openings, such as the Yugoslav Attack.

=== Tactics involving castling ===
Position: b8 black rook, c8 black bishop, d8 black king, h8 black rook, a7 black pawn, f7 black pawn, g7 black bishop, h7 black pawn, c6 black pawn, e6 black pawn, c5 black pawn, f4 white pawn, c3 white pawn, e3 white bishop, g3 white pawn, a2 white pawn, b2 white pawn, h2 white pawn, a1 white rook, e1 white king, g1 white knight, h1 white rook

Black to play

Tactical patterns involving castling are rare. One pattern involves castling queenside to deliver a double attack: the king attacks a rook (on b2 for White or b7 for Black), while the rook attacks a second enemy piece (usually the king). In the example shown, from the game Mattison–Millers, Königsberg 1926, Black played 13...Rxb2?? and resigned after 14.0-0-0+, which wins the rook.

Chess historian Edward Winter has proposed the name "Thornton castling trap" for this pattern, in reference to the earliest known example, Thornton–Boultbee, published in the Brooklyn Chess Chronicle in 1884. Other chess writers such as Gary Lane have since adopted this term.

Position: d8 black rook, e8 black king, g8 black knight, h8 black rook, a7 black pawn, b7 white pawn, c7 black pawn, g7 black pawn, h7 black pawn, f6 black pawn, b5 black queen, g5 white bishop, b4 black bishop, e4 black pawn, c3 white knight, a2 white pawn, b2 white pawn, f2 white pawn, g2 white pawn, h2 white pawn, a1 white rook, d1 white queen, e1 white king, h1 white rook

White to play

Another example of tactical castling is illustrated in the diagrammed position from the correspondence game Gurvich–Pampin, 1976. After 1.Qxd8+ Kxd8 2.0-0-0+ Ke7 3.Nxb5, White has won a rook by castling with check and simultaneously unpinning the knight.

Position: a8 black rook, c8 black bishop, e8 black king, h8 black rook, a7 black pawn, h7 white rook, c6 black pawn, d6 black pawn, f6 black bishop, g6 black pawn, c5 black pawn, g5 white knight, e4 white pawn, c3 white pawn, d3 white pawn, a2 white pawn, b2 white pawn, g2 white pawn, h2 white pawn, a1 white rook, b1 white knight, h1 white king

Black to play

Such a double attack can also be made by castling kingside, although this is much rarer. In this position from the blindfold game Karjakin–Carlsen, 2007, the move 19...0-0 threatens to win the knight on g5, which cannot move without losing the rook on h7. White cannot attempt to win back the piece with a fork due to the threat of back rank mate: 20.Rh6 Bxg5 21.Rxg6+ Kh7 22.Rxg5 would be met by 22...Rf1#. Karjakin had to concede a piece and resigned 14 moves later.

== Examples ==
=== Korchnoi vs. Karpov ===
Viktor Korchnoi, in his 1974 Candidates final match with Anatoly Karpov, asked the arbiter if castling was legal when the castling rook was under attack. The arbiter answered in the affirmative, Korchnoi executed the move, and Karpov resigned shortly after.

=== Heidenfeld vs. Kerins ===
Castling occurred three times in the game Wolfgang Heidenfeld–Nick Kerins, Dublin 1973. The third instance of castling, the second one by White, was illegal, as the white king had already moved. The game is as follows:

1.e4 e6 2.d4 d5 3.Be3 Nf6 4.e5 Nfd7 5.f4 c5 6.c3 Nc6 7.Nf3 Qb6 8.Qd2 c4 9.Be2 Na5 10.0-0 f5 11.Ng5 Be7 12.g4 Bxg5 13.fxg5 Nf8 14.gxf5 exf5 15.Bf3 Be6 16.Qg2 0-0-0 17.Na3 Ng6 18.Qd2 f4 19.Bf2 Bh3 20.Rfb1 Bf5 21.Nc2 h6 22.gxh6 Rxh6 23.Nb4 Qe6 24.Qe2 Ne7 25.b3 Qg6+ 26.Kf1 Bxb1 27.bxc4 dxc4 28.Qb2 Bd3+ 29.Ke1 Be4 30.Qe2 Bxf3 31.Qxf3 Rxh2 32.d5 Qf5 33.0-0-0 Rh3 34.Qe2 Rxc3+ 35.Kb2 Rh3 36.d6 Nec6 37.Nxc6 Nxc6 38.e6 Qe5+ 39.Qxe5 Nxe5 40.d7+ Nxd7 0–1

=== Averbakh vs. Purdy ===
Averbakh vs. Purdy, 1960

Position: a8 black rook, e8 black king, f8 black bishop, h8 black rook, a7 black pawn, g7 black pawn, h7 black pawn, c6 black pawn, e6 black bishop, f6 black pawn, e5 black pawn, c4 white pawn, c3 white pawn, a2 white pawn, d2 white knight, e2 white pawn, f2 white pawn, h2 white pawn, b1 white rook, c1 white bishop, e1 white king, h1 white rook

Black to move castled queenside, with the rook traversing the attacked b8-square.

In the game Yuri Averbakh–Cecil Purdy, Adelaide 1960, when Purdy castled queenside, Averbakh queried the move, pointing out that the rook had passed over an attacked square. Purdy indicated e8 and c8 and said, "The king", in an attempt to explain that this was forbidden only for the king. Averbakh replied, "Only the king? Not the rook?" Averbakh's colleague Vladimir Bagirov then explained the castling rules to him in Russian, and the game continued.

=== Edward Lasker vs. Thomas ===
Ed. Lasker vs. Thomas, 1912

Position: a8 black rook, b8 black knight, f8 black rook, a7 black pawn, b7 black bishop, c7 black pawn, d7 black pawn, e7 black queen, g7 black pawn, b6 black pawn, e6 black pawn, f6 white knight, d4 white pawn, g4 white knight, h4 white pawn, g3 white pawn, a2 white pawn, b2 white pawn, c2 white pawn, e2 white bishop, f2 white pawn, h2 white rook, a1 white rook, e1 white king, g1 black king

Position after 17...Kg1

In the game Edward Lasker–Sir George Thomas (London 1912), White could have checkmated with 18.0-0-0#, but he instead played 18.Kd2#. (See Edward Lasker's notable games.)

=== Prins vs. Day ===
Prins vs. Day, 1968

Position: a8 black rook, e8 black king, b7 black bishop, d7 black pawn, f7 black pawn, a6 black pawn, e6 black pawn, e5 white king, g5 black pawn, c4 white pawn, e4 black queen, a3 white pawn, e3 white pawn, b2 white pawn, e2 white bishop, a1 white rook, c1 white rook, e1 white queen

White to play

The diagram shows the final position of the game Lodewijk Prins–Lawrence Day (1968), where White resigned. Had the game continued, Black could have checkmated by castling:

29. Kf6 Qf5+ 30. Kg7 Qg6+ 31. Kh8 0-0-0#

(See Lawrence Day's notable chess games.)

=== Feuer vs. O'Kelly ===
Feuer vs. O'Kelly, 1934

Position: b8 black rook, c8 black bishop, d8 black queen, e8 black king, f8 black bishop, h8 black rook, c7 black pawn, e7 black knight, g7 black pawn, a6 black pawn, c6 black pawn, d6 black pawn, f6 black pawn, e5 black pawn, h5 black pawn, d4 white pawn, e4 white pawn, h4 white pawn, c3 white knight, d3 white queen, e3 white bishop, f3 white knight, a2 white pawn, b2 white pawn, c2 white pawn, f2 white pawn, g2 white pawn, a1 white rook, e1 white king, h1 white rook

The game ended 10....Rxb2 11.dxe5 dxe5?? 12.Qxd8+ Kxd8 13.0-0-0+ and O'Kelly resigned since the rook is lost.

In the 1934 Belgian Championship, Otto Feuer caught Albéric O'Kelly in the Thornton castling trap. In the position in the diagram, the game continued 10...Rxb2 11.dxe5 dxe5?? 12.Qxd8+ Kxd8 13.0-0-0+, and O'Kelly resigned. Feuer's last move simultaneously gave check and attacked the rook on b2.

=== Fischer vs. Najdorf ===
Fischer vs. Najdorf
Varna Olympiad, 1962

Position: a8 black rook, d8 black queen, e8 black king, h8 black rook, d7 black knight, f7 black pawn, h7 black pawn, a6 black pawn, f6 black pawn, c5 black bishop, e5 black pawn, f5 white knight, a4 white queen, c4 white bishop, e4 black pawn, h3 white pawn, a2 white pawn, b2 white pawn, f2 white pawn, g2 white pawn, a1 white rook, c1 white bishop, g1 white king

White to play

The diagram illustrates the consequences of losing castling rights. Fischer, with the white pieces, played 16.Ng7+ Ke7 17.Nf5+ Ke8. Although all the pieces were now on the same squares, the two positions were not identical because Black, having moved his king, no longer had the right to castle. White now had time to build pressure on the black king without worrying that the king might escape by castling.

== Artificial castling ==
Artificial castling, also known as castling by hand, is a maneuver whereby a player achieves a castled position without the use of castling.

Position: a8 black rook, c8 black bishop, d8 black queen, e8 black king, g8 black knight, h8 black rook, a7 black pawn, b7 black pawn, c7 black pawn, d7 black pawn, f7 black pawn, g7 black pawn, h7 black pawn, c6 black knight, b5 white bishop, c5 black bishop, e5 black pawn, e4 white pawn, f3 white knight, a2 white pawn, b2 white pawn, c2 white pawn, d2 white pawn, f2 white pawn, g2 white pawn, h2 white pawn, a1 white rook, b1 white knight, c1 white bishop, d1 white queen, e1 white king, h1 white rook

White to play

Position: a8 black rook, c8 black bishop, d8 black queen, e8 black king, h8 black rook, a7 black pawn, b7 black pawn, c7 black pawn, d7 black pawn, e7 black knight, f7 black pawn, g7 black pawn, h7 black pawn, b5 white bishop, e5 black knight, e4 white pawn, a2 white pawn, b2 white pawn, c2 white pawn, d2 white pawn, g2 white pawn, h2 white pawn, a1 white rook, b1 white knight, c1 white bishop, d1 white queen, f1 white rook, g1 white king

Position after 4.Kg1

In the first diagram (arising from the Ruy Lopez, Classical Defense):

1. Nxe5 Bxf2+?!

Black sees that if he plays 1...Nxe5, White responds with 2.d4, winning back the minor piece with a fork and taking control of the center. Instead of allowing this, Black hopes to cause trouble for White by returning the piece while depriving White of the right to castle. White can easily castle artificially, however. For example:

2. Kxf2 Nxe5 3. Rf1

White begins castling artificially.

3... Ne7 4. Kg1 (second diagram)

White has achieved a normal castled position via several moves. With the bishop pair and a central pawn majority, White has a slight advantage.

== Castling in chess variants ==
	a	b	c	d	e	f	g	h	i	j
8	a8 black rook	b8	c8 black circle	d8	e8	f8 black king	g8	h8	i8 black circle	j8 black rook	8
7	a7	b7	c7	d7	e7	f7	g7	h7	i7	j7	7
6	a6	b6	c6	d6	e6	f6	g6	h6	i6	j6	6
5	a5	b5	c5	d5	e5	f5	g5	h5	i5	j5	5
4	a4	b4	c4	d4	e4	f4	g4	h4	i4	j4	4
3	a3	b3	c3	d3	e3	f3	g3	h3	i3	j3	3
2	a2	b2	c2	d2	e2	f2	g2	h2	i2	j2	2
1	a1 white rook	b1	c1 white circle	d1	e1	f1 white king	g1	h1	i1 white circle	j1 white rook	1
	a	b	c	d	e	f	g	h	i	j

Castling in Capablanca chess

Variants of Western chess often include castling in their rulesets, sometimes in a modified form.

In variants played on a standard 8×8 board, castling is often the same as in standard chess. This includes variants that replace the king with a different royal piece, as is the case with the knight in Knightmate. Some variants, however, have different rules; for example, in Chess960, the king may move as many as six squares and as few as zero squares when castling, depending on the starting position. Former world Fischer Random Chess Champion Wesley So was confused by the castling rules during the 2022 championships, and attempted to illegally castle out of check versus Ian Nepomniachtchi.

Castling can also be adapted to variants with different board sizes and shapes. Some such variants, like Capablanca chess (10×8) or chess on a really big board (16×16), preserve the castling movement of the rooks, meaning that the king moves a different distance along the back rank. In a few variants, most notably Wildebeest chess (11×10), the player may choose to move the king any distance and move the rook accordingly.

Castling sometimes features in chess variants not played on a square grid, such as masonic chess, triangular chess, Shafran's and Brusky's hexagonal chess, and millennium 3D chess. In 5D Chess with Multiverse Time Travel, castling is possible within the spatial dimensions but not across time or between timelines.

Some chess variants do not feature castling, such as losing chess, where the king is not royal, and Grand Chess, where the rooks have significantly more opening mobility.

In a handicap game with rook odds, the player giving odds may castle with the absent rook, moving only the king.

=== Chess without castling ===
Writing in 2019, former world chess champion Vladimir Kramnik proposed a variant of chess without castling. This variant would reduce king safety, theoretically leading to more dynamic games, as it would be considerably harder to force a draw and the pieces would be forced to engage in a mêlée. In 2021, former world champion Viswanathan Anand defeated Kramnik 2½–1½ in a no-castling exhibition match under classical time controls.

== Castling in chess problems ==
Castling features in some chess problems. The earliest known study containing castling was published in 1843 by Julius Mendheim.

=== Retrograde analysis ===
Castling is common in retrograde analysis problems. By chess problem convention, if a player's king and rook are on their original squares, the player is assumed to have castling rights unless it can be proved otherwise. In some retrograde analysis problems, the solver (who usually plays White) is required to prove that the opponent has previously moved their king or rook and therefore cannot castle. This is sometimes accomplished by castling or by capturing en passant, thereby disproving other possible game histories.

Armand Lapierre

Position: e8 black king, h8 black rook, a7 black pawn, c7 black pawn, e7 black pawn, g7 black pawn, b6 black pawn, e6 white pawn, d4 white rook, g3 white pawn, f2 white pawn, h2 white pawn, a1 white rook, e1 white king

White to play and mate in two

The diagram shows a mate in two. 1.Rad1? 0-0 does not work. The key is 1.0-0-0! This demonstrates that the white king has not moved yet and that the rook on d4 must therefore be a promoted piece. Therefore, either the black king or black rook has previously moved to let the white rook off the back rank. Therefore Black cannot castle. After any move by Black, 2.Rd8 is mate.

=== Novelty problems ===
Siegfried Hornecker

Position: e8 black king, h8 black bishop, h7 white pawn, f5 white king

Helpmate in three with Koko fairy condition

Some joke chess problems involve castling with a promoted rook of the opponent's color. In orthodox chess, this would be illegal since the rook would be giving check to the king, but under fairy chess conditions, this might not actually be check.

The diagrammed problem involves castling with an opposing rook under the Koko fairy condition (each piece must end up adjacent to another piece when moving). The solution (Black's move being given first per helpmate convention) is:

1. Bg7 h8=R 2. Bf6 Kg6 3. 0-0 Kh7#

where, after 3.0-0, White's rook is not checking the king; a hypothetical capture of the king would result in the rook not being adjacent to any other piece, which is illegal under the Koko condition.

The allowance of castling with a "phantom rook" in handicap games has also been used in joke problems. Many other joke variations on castling are possible.

==== Vertical castling ====
C. Staugaard

Position: g8 white bishop, e7 white pawn, c3 black pawn, d3 black king, c2 white knight, e1 white king, h1 white rook

White to play and mate in two

In 1907, C. Staugaard composed a two-mover in which White promotes a pawn to a rook and then castles vertically with the newly promoted rook (placing the king on e3 and the rook on e2), since the rook has not moved. In the position on the right, White plays 1.e8=R, and after the forced move 1...Kxc2 castles vertically with the promoted rook, checkmating Black.

Vertical castling, also known as "Staugaard castling" or "Pam–Krabbé castling", has been used in a few novelty chess problems.

Tim Krabbé's 1985 book Chess Curiosities includes a problem featuring vertical castling, along with an incorrect claim that the problem's 1973 publication prompted FIDE to amend the castling laws in 1974 to add the requirement that the king and rook be on the same rank. In reality, the original FIDE Laws from 1930 explicitly stated that castling must be done with a king and a rook on the same rank (traverse in French). It is unclear whether any historically published sets of rules would technically allow such a move.

== Nomenclature ==
In most European languages, the term for castling is derived from the Persian word rukh (e.g. rochieren, rochada, enroque), while queenside and kingside castling are referred to using the adjectives meaning "long" and "short" (or "big" and "small"), respectively.
