= List of chess openings named after places =

Many of the 1,327 named chess openings and variants listed by The Oxford Companion to Chess are named for geographic places.

== A ==
- Aachen Gambit of the Nimzowitsch Defense – 1.e4 Nc6 2.d4 d5 3.exd5 Nb4
- Aasum Gambit of the Dunst Opening – 1.Nc3 d5 2.e4 dxe4 3.Bc4
- Abbazia Defense of the King's Gambit – 1.e4 e5 2.f4 exf4 3.Nf3 d5
- Adelaide Countergambit of the King's Gambit – 1.e4 e5 2.f4 Nc6 3.Nf3 f5
- Agincourt Defense of the English Opening – 1.c4 e6
- Aleppo Gambit, synonym of the Queen's Gambit – 1.d4 d5 2.c4
- Amazon Attack of the Queen's Pawn Opening – 1.d4 d5 2.Qd3
- American Attack of the Dutch Defense, variation of the Staunton Gambit – 1.d4 f5 2.e4 fxe4 3.Nd2
- American Attack of the Sicilian Defense, Taimanov Variation – 1.e4 c5 2.Nf3 e6 3. d4 cxd4 4. Nxd4 Nc6 5. Nc3 Nf6 6. Ndb5 Bb4 7. Nd6+
- Amsterdam Variation of the Sicilian Defense, Najdorf Variation – 1.e4 c5 2.Nf3 d6 3.d4 cxd4 4.Nxd4 Nf6 5.Nc3 a6 6.f4
- Amsterdam Variation of the Sicilian Defense, Dragon Variation – 1.e4 c5 2.Nf3 d6 3.d4 cxd4 4.Nxd4 Nf6 5.Nc3 g6 6.Be3 Bg7 7.Be2 Nc6 8.Qd2
- Arctic Defense of the Zukertort Opening – 1.Nf3 f6
- Argentine Gambit of the Baltic Defense – 1.d4 d5 2.c4 Bf5 3.cxd5 Bxb1 4.Qa4+ c6 5.dxc6 Nxc6
- Argentine Variation of the Cambridge Springs Defense – 1.d4 d5 2.c4 e6 3.Nc3 Nf6 4.Bg5 Nbd7 5.e3 c6 6.Nf3 Qa5 7.Nd2 Bb4 8.Qc2 0-0 9.Bh4
- Arkhangelsk Defense (or Archangel Defense) of the Ruy Lopez – 1.e4 e5 2.Nf3 Nc6 3.Bb5 a6 4.Ba4 Nf6 5.0-0 b5 6.Bb3 Bb7
- Armenian Variation of the French Defense – 1.e4 e6 2.d4 d5 3.Nc3 Bb4 4.e5 c5 5.a3 Ba5 6. b4 cxd4
- Australian Defense – 1.d4 Na6
- Australian Gambit of the King's Gambit – 1.e4 e5 2.f4 exf4 3.Nf3 g5 4.Bc4 g4 5.h4
- Austrian Attack in the Pirc Defense – 1.e4 d6 2.d4 Nf6 3.Nc3 g6 4.f4
- Austrian Defense of the Queen's Gambit Declined – 1.d4 d5 2.c4 c5

== B ==
- Baguio Variation of the Ruy Lopez -1.e4 e5 2.Nf3 Nc6 3.Bb5 a6 4.Ba4 Nf6 5.0-0 Nxe4 6.d4 b5 7.Bb3 d5 8.dxe5 Be6 9.c3 Bc5 10.Nbd2 0-0 11.Bc2 Bf5
- Balkan Gambit – 1.e4 e6 2.Nf3 d5 3.d3 dxe4 4.Ng5
- Baltic Defense of the Queen's Gambit Declined – 1.d4 d5 2.c4 Bf5
- Baltic Defense of the Polish Opening – 1.b4 d5 2.Bb2 Bf5
- Baltic Opening (or Dunst Opening) – 1.Nc3
- Basque Gambit of the Ruy Lopez – 1.e4 e5 2.Nf3 Nc6 3.Bb5 a6 4.Ba4 Nf6 5.0-0 Be7 6.d4 exd4 7.e5 Ne4 8.c3
- Basque Opening – 1.d4 Nf6 2.b3
- Batavo Gambit of the Bird's Opening - 1.f4 d5 2.Nf3 c5 3.e4 dxe4
- Battambang Opening – 1.Nc3 e5 2.a3
- Bavarian Gambit – 1.e4 e5 2.c4 d5
- Bayreuth Variation of the Ruy Lopez – 1.e4 e5 2.Nf3 Nc6 3.Bb5 a6 4.Ba4 Nf6 5.Bxc6
- Belgrade Gambit of the Four Knights – 1.e4 e5 2.Nf3 Nc6 3.Nc3 Nf6 4.d4 exd4 5.Nd5
- Benelux Variation of the Ruy Lopez – 1.e4 e5 2.Nf3 Nc6 3.Bb5 Bc5 4.c3 Nf6 5.0-0 0-0 6.d4 Bb6 (named for the Benelux countries)
- Berlin Defense of the Ruy Lopez – 1.e4 e5 2.Nf3 Nc6 3.Bb5 Nf6
- Beverwijk Variation of the Ruy Lopez, Berlin Defense – 1.e4 e5 2.Nf3 Nc6 3.Bb5 Nf6 4.0-0 Bc5
- Birmingham Defense (more commonly as the St. George Defense): – 1.e4 a6
- Birmingham Gambit of the Polish Opening – 1.b4 c5
- Bled Variation of the English Opening – 1.c4 c6 2.Nf3 d5 3.b3 Nf6 4.Bb2 g6
- Bohemian Attack of the Caro–Kann Defense – 1.e4 c6 2.Ne2
- Brazilian Defense – 1.e4 e5 2.Nf3 Qe7
- Bremen Variation of the English Opening – 1.c4 e5 2.Nc3 Nf6 3.g3
- Breslau Variation of the Ruy Lopez – 1.e4 e5 2.Nf3 Nc6 3.Bb5 a6 4.Ba4 Nf6 5.0-0 Nxe4 6.d4 b5 7.Bb3 d5 8.dxe5 Be6 9.c3 Be7 10.Re1 0-0 11.Nd4 Nxe5
- Brooklyn Defense of the Alekhine's Defense – 1.e4 Nf6 2.e5 Ng8
- Brussels Gambit of the Sicilian Defense – 1.e4 c5 2.Nf3 f5
- Budapest Gambit – 1.d4 Nf6 2.c4 e5
- Bulgarian Variation of the Ruy Lopez – 1.e4 e5 2.Nf3 Nc6 3.Bb5 a5

== C ==
- Calabrese Countergambit of the Bishop's Opening – 1.e4 e5 2.Bc4 f5
- Cambridge Gambit of the Alekhine's Defense – 1.e4 Nf6 2.e5 Nd5 3.d4 d6 4.c4 Nb6 5.f4 g5
- Cambridge Springs Variation of the Queen's Gambit Declined – 1.d4 d5 2.c4 e6 3.Nc3 Nf6 4.Bg5 Nbd7 5.Nf3 c6 6.e3 Qa5
- Canadian Gambit of the Indian Game – 1.d4 Nf6 2.Nd2 c5 3.e4
- Canadian Opening of the Indian Game – 1.d4 Nf6 2.Nd2
- Carlsbad Variation of the Slav Defense – 1.d4 d5 2.c4 c6 3.Nf3 Nf6 4.Nc3 dxc4 5.a4 Bf5 6.Ne5 Nbd7 7.Nxc4 Qc7 8.g3 e5
- Carlsbad Variation of the Sicilian Defense, Wing Gambit – 1.e4 c5 2.b4 cxb4 3.a3 bxa3
- Catalan Opening – 1.d4 Nf6 2.c4 e6 3.g3 d5 4.Bg2
- Chelyabinsk Variation of the Sicilian Defense – 1.e4 c5 2.Nf3 Nc6 3.d4 cxd4 4.Nxd4 Nf6 5.Nc3 e5 6.Ndb5 d6 7.Bg5 a6 8.Na3 b5
- Chicago Defense of the Sicilian Defense, Smith–Morra Gambit – 1.e4 c5 2.d4 cxd4 3.c3 dxc3 4.Nxc3 d6 5.Bc4 e6 6.Nf3 Nf6 7.0-0 a6
- Chicago Gambit of the Irish Gambit – 1.e4 e5 2.Nf3 Nc6 3.Nxe5? Nxe5 4.d4
- Chinese Variation of the Pirc Defense – 1.e4 d6 2.d4 Nf6 3.Nc3 g6 4.Be2 Bg7 5.g4!?
- Chinese Variation of the Sicilian Defense, Dragon Variation – 1.e4 c5 2.Nf3 d6 3.d4 cxd4 4.Nxd4 Nf6 5.Nc3 g6 6.Be3 Bg7 7.f3 0-0 8.Qd2 Nc6 9.Bc4 Bd7 10.0-0-0 Rb8
- Clarendon Court Variation of the Benoni Defense – 1.d4 c5 2.d5 f5
- Cocquio Countergambit of the QGD – 1.d4 d5 2.c4 Nf6 3.cxd5 c6
- Cologne Gambit of the Ware Opening – 1.a4 b6 2.d4 d5 2.Nc3 Nd7
- Colorado Gambit of the Nimzowitsch Defense – 1.e4 Nc6 2.Nf3 f5
- Copenhagen Defense of the Danish Gambit – 1.e4 e5 2.d4 exd4 3.c3 dxc3 4.Bc4 cxb2 5.Bxb2 Bb4+
- Cracow Variation of the Italian Game – 1.e4 e5 2.Nf3 Nc6 3.Bc4 Bc5 4.c3 Nf6 5.d4 exd4 6.cxd4 Bb4+ 7.Kf1?!
- Czech Defense, the term used by Siegbert Tarrasch for the Slav Defense – 1.d4 d5 2.c4 c6
- Czech Defense (Pribyl System) of the Pirc Defense – 1.e4 d6 2.d4 Nf6 3.Nc3 c6
- Czech Defense of the Polish opening – 1.b4 e5 2.Bb2 d6
- Czech-Indian Variation of the Indian Game – 1.d4 Nf6 2.Nf3 c6
- Czech Variation of the Benoni Defense – 1.d4 Nf6 2.c4 c5 3.d5 e5
- Czech Variation of the Old Indian Defense – 1.d4 Nf6 2.c4 d6 3.Nc3 c6
- Czech Variation of the Slav Defense – 1.d4 d5 2.c4 c6 3.Nc3 Nf6 4.Nf3 dxc4 5.a4 Bf5 Slav Defense: Modern, Alapin Variation, Czech Variation

== D ==
- Danish Gambit – 1.e4 e5 2.d4 exd4 3.c3
- Danube Gambit – 1.d4 Nf6 2.c4 g6 3.d5 b5 4.cxb5 a6 5.bxa6 c6
- Dresden Opening – 1.e4 e5 2.Nf3 Nc6 3.c4
- Duisburg Gambit of the QGD – 1.d4 d5 2.c4 e6 3.Nc3 c5 4.cxd5 cxd4
- Düsseldorf Gambit of the Van Geet Opening – 1.Nc3 c5 2. b4
- Dutch Defense – 1.d4 f5
- Dutch Variation of the Slav Defense – 1.d4 d5 2.c4 c6 3.Nc3 Nf6 4.Nf3 dxc4 5.a4 Bf5 6.e3
- Dutch Variation of Reti Opening – 1.Nf3 f5
- Dutch Variation of Nimzowitsch-Larsen Attack – 1.b3 f5

== E ==
- East Indian Defense – 1.d4 Nf6 2.Nf3 g6
- Edinburgh Variation of the Caro–Kann Defense – 1.e4 c6 2.d4 d5 3.Nd2 Qb6
- English Attack of the Sicilian Defense, Najdorf Variation – 1.e4 c5 2.Nf3 d6 3.d4 cxd4 4.Nxd4 Nf6 5.Nc3 a6 6.Be3 and 7.f3
- English Defense – 1.d4 e6 2.c4 b6
- English Opening – 1.c4

== F ==
- Finnish Variation of the Caro–Kann Defense – 1.e4 c6 2.d4 d5 3.Nc3 dxe4 4.Nxe4 h6
- Florentine Gambit of the King's Indian Defense – 1.d4 Nf6 2.c4 g6 3.Nc3 Bg7 4.e4 d6 5.f4 0-0 6.Be2 c5 7.d5 e6 8.Nf3 exd5 9.e5
- Folkestone Variation (or Swedish Variation) of the QGD – 1.d4 d5 2.c4 e6 3.Nc3 c5 4.cxd5 exd5 5.Nf3 Nc6 6.g3 c4
- Fort Knox Variation of the French Defense – 1.e4 e6 2.d4 d5 3.Nc3 dxe4 4.Nxe4 Bd7 5.Nf3 Bc6
- Frankfurt Variation of the French Defense – 1.e4 e6 2.d4 d5 3.Nc3 Nf6 4.Bg5 Be7 5.e5 Ng8 6.Be3 b6
- French Defense – 1.e4 e6

== G ==
- Genoa Opening (known as the Grob Attack) – 1.g4
- Gent Gambit of the Amar Opening (Paris) – 1.Nh3 d5 2.g3 e5 3.f4 Bxh3 4.Bxh3 exf4 5.0-0 fxg3 6.hxg3
- German Defense of the Polish Opening (Orangutan or Sokolsky Opening) – 1.b4 d5 2.Bb2 Qd6
- Glasgow Kiss Variation of the Slav Defense – 1.d4 d5 2.c4 c6 3.Nc3 Nf6 4.e3 Bf5 5.cxd5 cxd5 6.Qb3 Nc6
- Goteborg (Gothenburg) System of the Scandinavian Defense – 1.e4 d5 2.exd5 Qxd5 3.Nc3 Qa5 4.d4 e5 5.Nf3
- Gothenburg Variation of the Sicilian Defense, Najdorf Variation – 1.e4 c5 2.Nf3 d6 3.d4 cxd4 4.Nxd4 Nf6 5.Nc3 a6 6.Bg5 e6 7.f4 Be7 8.Qf3 h6 9.Bh4 g5
- Granada Gambit of the Italian Game, Two Knights Defense, Blackburne Variation – 1.e4 e5 2.Nf3 Nc6 3.Bc4 Nf6 4.Ng5 d5 5. exd5 Na5 6.Bb5+ c6 7.dxc6 bxc6 8.Qf3 cxb5 9.Qxa8
- Graz Variation of the Ruy Lopez – 1.e4 e5 2. Nf3 Nc6 3. Bb5 a6 4. Ba4 b5 5. Bb3 Bc5
- Graz Attack of the Nimzowitsch-Larsen Attack – 1.b3 d5 2.Ba3
- Greek Defense (or Owen's Defense) – 1.e4 b6
- Guatemalan Defense of the Greek Defense or Owen's Defense – 1.e4 b6 2.d4 Ba6

== H ==
- Hastings Variation of the Queen's Gambit Declined – 1.d4 d5 2.c4 e6 3.Nf3 Nf6 4.Bg5 h6 5.Bxf6 Qxf6 8.Nc3 c6 7.Qb3
- Hollywood Variation of the King's Indian Defense – 1.d4 Nf6 2.Nf3 g6 3.c4 Bg7 4.Nc3 0-0 5.e3 d6 6.Be2 Nc6
- Hungarian Attack of the English Opening – 1.c4 e5 2.Nc3 Nc6 3.g3 g6 4.Bg2 Bg7 5.Rb1
- Hungarian Defense – 1.e4 e5 2.Nf3 Nc6 3.Bc4 Be7
- Hungarian Gambit (or Breyer Gambit) of the King's Gambit – 1.e4 e5 2.f4 exf4 3.Qf3
- Hungarian Gambit of the Catalan Opening – 1.d4 Nf6 2.c4 e6 3.g3 e5
- Hungarian Opening (or Benko's Opening) – 1.g3
- Hungarian Variation of the Sicilian Defense – 1.e4 c5 2.Nf3 d6 3.d4 cxd4 4.Qxd4

== I ==
- Icelandic Gambit of the Scandinavian Defense – 1.e4 d5 2.exd5 Nf6 3.c4 e6
- Indian Defenses: a complex of chess openings beginning – 1.d4 Nf6, including the Nimzo-Indian Defense, Queen's Indian Defense, King's Indian Defense, Bogo-Indian Defense, Old Indian Defense, Janowski Indian Defense, etc.
- Inverted Hungarian Opening – 1.e4 e5 2.Nf3 Nc6 3.Be2
- Irish Gambit – 1.e4 e5 2.Nf3 Nc6 3.Nxe5
- Israeli Gambit (or Halasz Gambit) – 1.e4 e5 2.d4 exd4 3.f4
- Italian Gambit – 1.e4 e5 2.Nf3 Nc6 3.Bc4 Bc5 4.d4
- Italian Game – 1.e4 e5 2.Nf3 Nc6 3.Bc4 (Bc5)

== J ==
- Jalalabad Defense – 1.e4 e5 2.Nf3 c5 or 1.e4 c5 2.Nf3 e5

== K ==
- Kahiko-Hula Gambit of the English Opening – 1.c4 e5 2.e3 Nf6 3.f4 exf4 4.Nf3
- Karlsruhe Variation of the Blackmar-Diemer Gambit – 1.d4 d5 2.e4 dxe4 3.f3 g6
- Kazakh Variation of the King's Indian – 1.d4 Nf6 2.c4 g6 3.Nc3 Bg7 4.e4 d6 5.Nf3 0-0 6.Be2 Na6
- Kecskemet Variation of the Ruy Lopez –1.e4 e5 2.Nf3 Nc6 3.Bb5 a6 4.Ba4 Nf6 5.0-0 Be7 6.Re1 d6 7.c3 0-0 8.d4 Bd7 9.Nbd2 Be8
- Kemeri Variation of the King's Indian Defense – 1.d4 Nf6 2.c4 g6 3.g3 d5
- Kentucky Opening – 1.e4 e5 2.Nf3 Nc6 3.Bc4 Bc5 4.Bxf7+? Kxf7 5.Nxe5+ Nxe5
- Keoni-Hiva Gambit of the Van't Kruijs Opening – 1.e3 e5 2.Nc3 Nf6 3.f4 exf4 4.Nf3 (Akahi Variation), 1.e3 e5 2.Nc3 Nc6 3.f4 exf4 4.Nf3 (Alua Variation), 1.e3 e5 2.Nc3 d5 3.f4 exf4 4.Nf3 (Ekolu Variation)
- Kiel Variation of the Scandinavian Defense – 1.e4 d5 2.exd5 Nf6 3.d4 Nxd5 4.c4 Nb4

== L ==
- Latvian Gambit – 1.e4 e5 2.Nf3 f5
- Leipzig Gambit (or Müller-Schulze Gambit) – 1.e4 e5 2.Nf3 Nc6 3.Nc3 Nf6 4.Nxe5?!
- Lemberg Gambit (Lviv Gambit) – 1.Nf3 Nf6 2.e4 or 1.Nf3 d5 2.e4
- Lemberg Countergambit – 1.d4 d5 2.e4 dxe4 3.Nc3 e5
- Leningrad Variation of the Dutch Defense – 1.d4 f5 2.g3 g6
- Lisbon Gambit of the Dutch Defense – 1.d4 f5 2.g4 fxg4 3.h3
- Lisbon Gambit of the Queen's Pawn Opening, English Rat – 1.d4 d6 2.c4 e5 3.dxe5 Nc6
- Lithuanian Variation of the Mikėnas Defense – 1.d4 Nc6 2.c4 e5 3.d5 Nce7
- Lodz Variation of the Tarrasch Defense – 1.d4 d5 2.c4 e6 3.Nc3 c5 4.cxd5 exd5 5.Nf3 Nc6 6.g3
- London System, a set of related chess openings characterised by 1.d4 followed by an early Bf4, e.g. 1.d4 d5 2.Nf3 Nf6 3.Bf4; 1.d4 Nf6 2.Nf3 e6 3.Bf4; and 1.d4 Nf6 2.Nf3 g6 3.Bf4

== M ==
- Macedonian Variation of the English Opening – 1.c4 e5 2.Nc3 Nf6 3.f4
- Maltese Falcon Attack (or Gibbins-Wiedehagen Gambit) – 1.d4 Nf6 2.g4 Nxg4 3.f3 Nf6 4.e4
- Manhattan Gambit of the Dutch Defense – 1.d4 f5 2.Qd3 Nf6 3.g4
- Manhattan Variation of the QGD (also called the Westphalia Defense) – 1.d4 d5 2.c4 e6 3.Nc3 Nf6 4.Bg5 Nbd7 5.Nf3 Bb4 or 5.e3 Bb4
- Mannheim Variation of the QGA – 1.d4 d5 2.c4 dxc4 3.Nf3 Nf6 4.Qa4+
- Mar del Plata Variation of the King's Indian Defense – 1.d4 Nf6 2.c4 g6 3.Nc3 Bg7 4.e4 d6 5.Nf3 0–0 6.Be2 e5 7.0–0 Nc6 8.d5 Ne7
- Margate Variation of the Sicilian Defense – 1.e4 c5 2.Nf3 d6 3.d4 cxd4 4.Nxd4 Nf6 5.Nc3 Nc6 6.Bg5 e6 7.Bb5
- Marienbad Variation of the Sicilian Defense, Wing Gambit – 1.e4 c5 2.b4 cxb4 3.a3 d5 4.exd5 Qxd5 5.Bb2
- Massachusetts Defense of the Caro–Kann Defense – 1.e4 c6 2.d4 f5
- Mediterranean Defense – 1.e4 e6 2.d4 Nf6
- Meran Variation of the Semi-Slav Defense – 1.d4 d5 2.c4 c6 3.Nf3 Nf6 4.Nc3 e6 5.e3 Nbd7 6.Bd3 dxc4 7.Bxc4
- Mexican Defense – 1.d4 Nf6 2.c4 Nc6
- Miami Variation of the Italian Gambit – 1.e4 e5 2.Nf3 Nc6 3.Bc4 Bc5 4.d4 Bxd4 5.Nxd4 Nxd4 6.Be3
- Modern Archangel Defense of the Ruy Lopez – 1.e4 e5 2.Nf3 Nc6 3.Bb5 a6 4.Ba4 Nf6 5.0-0 b5 6.Bb3 Bc5
- Mongolian Attack – 1.Nf3 Nf6 2.Nd4
- Monte Carlo Variation of the French Defense – 1.e4 e6 2.d4 d5 3.exd5 exd5 4.c4
- Montevideo Defense – 1.d4 Nc6 2.d5 Nb8
- Moscow Variation of the Semi-Slav Defense – 1.d4 d5 2.c4 c6 3.Nf3 Nf6 4.Nf3 e6 5.Bg5 h6
- Moscow Variation of the Sicilian Defense – 1.e4 c5 2.Nf3 d6 3.Bb5+
- Mujannah Formation of the Old Benoni Defense – 1.d4 c5 2. d5 f5
- Mujannah Opening (or Arabian Opening) of the Bird's Opening – 1.f4 d5 2.c4

== N ==
- New Castle Gambit of the French Defense, Tarrasch Variation – 1.e4 e6 2.d4 d5 3.Nd2 e5
- New York Variation of the Benoni Defense – 1.d4 Nf6 2.c4 c5 3.d5 e6 4.Nc3 exd5 5.cxd5 d6 6.e4 g6 7.Nf3 Bg7 8.h3
- Nordic Gambit – 1.e4 e5 2.d4 exd4 3.c3 (alternative name for the Danish Gambit)
- Nordwalde Variation of the King's Gambit Declined – 1.e4 e5 2.f4 Qf6
- Norfolk Gambit of the Zukertort Opening – 1.Nf3 d5 2.b3 c5 3.e4 or 1.Nf3 d5 2.b3 Nf6 3.Bb2 c5 4.e4
- North Sea Variation (or Norwegian Defense) of the Modern Defense – 1.e4 g6 2.d4 Nf6 3.e5 Nh5
- Norwegian Gambit of the Modern Defense – 1.e4 g6 2.d4 Nf6 3.e5 Nh5 4.Be2 d6
- Norwegian Defense of the Modern Defense – 1.e4 g6 2.d4 Nf6
- Norwegian Defense of the Ruy Lopez – 1.e4 e5 2.Nf3 Nc6 3.Bb5 a6 4.Ba4 b5 5.Bb3 Na5
- Nottingham Variation of the Sicilian Defense, Dragon Variation – 1.e4 c5 2.Nf3 d6 3.d4 cxd4 4.Nxd4 Nf6 5.Nc3 g6 6.Be3 Bg7 7.Be2 Nc6 8.Nb3
- Novosibirsk Variation of the Dunst Opening – 1.Nc3 c5 2.d4 cxd4 3.Qxd4 Nc6 4.Qh4
- Novosibirsk Variation of the Sicilian Defense – 1.e4 c5 2.Nf3 Nc6 3.d4 cxd4 4.Nxd4 Nf6 5.Nc3 e5 6.Ndb5 d6 7.Bg5 a6 8.Na3 b5 9.Bxf6 gxf6 10.Nd5 Bg7
- Nuremberg Variation of the Ruy Lopez – 1.e4 e5 2.Nf3 Nc6 3.Bb5 f6

== O ==
- Odessa Variation of the King's Indian – 1.d4 Nf6 2.c4 g6 3.Nc3 Bg7 4.e4 d6 5.Nf3 0-0 6.Be2 e5 7.0-0 Nc6 8.d5 Ne7 9.Bg5
- Omaha Gambit of the Vienna Game – 1.e4 e5 2.Nc3 d6 3.f4
- Oxford Variation of the Vienna Game – 1.e4 e5 2.Nc3 Nf6 3.f4 d5 4.fxe5 Nxe4 5.d3
- Oxford Gambit of the Four Knights Game – 1.e4 e5 2.Nf3 Nc6 3.Nc3 Nf6 4.d4 Bb4 5.d5 Nd4

== P ==
- Paris Defense (or Semi-Italian Opening) – 1.e4 e5 2.Nf3 Nc6 3.Bc4 d6
- Paris Gambit – 1.Nh3 d5 2.g3 e5 3.f4 (intending 3...Bxh3 4.Bxh3 exf4 5.0-0)
- Paris Opening (or Amar Opening) – 1.Nh3
- Persian Opening – 1.c3 c5 2.Qa4 Nf6 3.g4
- Peruvian Variation of the Queen's Gambit Declined – 1.d4 d5 2.c4 e6 3.Nc3 Nf6 4.Bg5 c5
- Philippine Attack of the Pirc Defense – 1.e4 d6 2.d4 Nf6 3.Nc3 g6 4.Bg5 Bg7 5.f4
- Pittsburgh Variation of the QGD – 1.d4 d5 2.c4 e6 3.Nc3 Nf6 4.Bg5 Be7 5.e3 Nbd7 6.Nf3 b6 7.cxd5 exd5 8.Bb5
- Podebrady Variation of the Sicilian Defense – 1.e4 c5 2.Nf3 d6 3.d4 cxd4 4.Nxd4 Nf6 5.Nc3 Nc6 6.Bg5 e6 7.Nb3
- Polish Opening (or Orangutan) – 1.b4
- Polish Defense – 1.d4 b5 or 1.Nf3 Nf6 2.g3 b5
- Polish Attack – 1.Nf3 Nf6 2.b4
- Polish Gambit – 1.e4 b5 2.Bxb5 c6
- Polish Gambit of the Anderssen Opening – 1.a3 a5 2.b4
- Polish Spike – 1.b4 Nf6 2.Bb2 g6 3.g4
- Polish Variation of the Indian Game – 1.d4 Nf6 2.Nf3 b5
- Portsmouth Gambit of the Sicilian Defense – 1.e4 c5 2.Nf3 Nc6 3.b4
- Portuguese Gambit of the Scandinavian Defense – 1.e4 d5 2.exd5 Nf6 3.d4 Bg4 4.f3 Bf5 5.Bb5+ Nbd7
- Portuguese Opening – 1.e4 e5 2.Bb5
- Portuguese Variation of the King's Gambit – 1.e4 e5 2.f4 exf4 3.Nf3 g5 4.Bc4 g4 5.Ne5 Qh4+ 6.Kf1 Nc6
- Prague Variation of the Tarrasch Defense – 1.d4 d5 2.c4 e6 3.Nc3 c5 4.cxd5 exd5 5.Nf3 Nc6 6.g3 Nf6
- Prussian Game (or Two Knights Defense against the Italian Game) – 1.e4 e5 2.Nf3 Nc6 3.Bc4 Nf6
- Pyrenees Gambit – 1.d4 Nf6 2.c4 b5

== R ==
- Riga Variation of the Ruy Lopez – 1.e4 e5 2.Nf3 Nc6 3.Bb5 a6 4.Ba4 Nf6 5.0-0 Nxe4 6.d4 exd4
- Rio de Janeiro Variation of the Ruy Lopez – 1.e4 e5 2.Nf3 Nc6 3.Bb5 Nf6 4.0-0 Nxe4 5.d4 Be7
- Romanian Opening (or Dunst Opening) – 1.Nc3
- Romanian Defense of the Wing Gambit – 1.e4 c5 2.b4 cxb4 3.a3 d5 4.exd5 Qxd5 5.Nf3 e5 6.Bb2 Nc6 7.c4 Qe6
- Rotterdam Variation of the Slav Defense – 1.d4 d5 2.c4 c6 3.Nf3 Nf6 4.e3 Bf5 5.cxd5 cxd5 6.Qb3
- Russian Defense of the Ruy Lopez – 1.e4 e5 2.Nf3 Nc6 3.Bb5 a6 4.Ba4 Nf6 5.0-0 d6
- Russian Game (or Petrov's Defense) – 1.e4 e5 2.Nf3 Nf6

== S ==
- San Francisco Gambit of the Sicilian Defense – 1.e4 c5 2.Nf3 Nc6 3.Bb5 Na5 4.b4
- San Remo Variation of the Nimzo-Indian Defense – 1.d4 Nf6 2.c4 e6 3.Nc3 Bb4 4.Qc2 d5 5.a3 Bxc3+ 6.Qxc3 Ne4 7.Qc2 Nc6 8.e3 e5
- San Sebastian Variation of the Queen's Gambit Declined – 1.d4 d5 2.c4 e6 3.Nc3 Nf6 4.Nf3 c5 5.cxd5 Nxd5 6.e4 Nxc3 7.bxc3 cxd4 8.cxd4 Bb4+ 9.Bd2 Qa5
- Saragossa Opening – 1.c3
- Scandinavian Defense – 1.e4 d5
- Scheveningen Variation of the Sicilian Defense – 1.e4 c5 2.Nf3 d6 3.d4 cxd4 4.Nxd4 Nf6 5.Nc3 e6
- Scotch Four Knights Game – 1.e4 e5 2.Nf3 Nc6 3.Nc3 Nf6 4.d4
- Scotch Gambit – 1.e4 e5 2.Nf3 Nc6 3.d4 exd4 4.Bc4
- Scotch Game – 1.e4 e5 2.Nf3 Nc6 3.d4
- Seattle Gambit of the Budapest Gambit – 1.d4 Nf6 2.c4 e5 3.dx5 Ng4 4.e4 h5
- Semmering Variation of the Semi-Slav Defense – 1.d4 d5 2.c4 e6 3.Nf3 Nf6 4.e3 c6 5.Nbd2 Nbd7 6.Bd3 c5
- Seville Variation of the Grünfeld Defense – 1.d4 Nf6 2.c4 g6 3.Nc3 d5 4.cxd5 Nxd5 5.e4 Nxc3 6.bxc3 Bg7 7.Bc4 c5 8.Ne2 Nc6 9.Be3 0-0 10.0-0 Bg4 11.f3 Na5 12.Bxf7+
- Siberian Attack of the Indian Defense – 1.d4 Nf6 2.Qd3 d5 3.Nc3
- Siberian Trap in the Sicilian Defense, Smith–Morra Gambit – 1.e4 c5 2.d4 cxd4 3.c3 dxc3 4.Nxc3 Nc6 5.Nf3 e6 6.Bc4 Qc7 7.0-0 Nf6 8.Qe2 Ng4! 9.h3?? (or 9.Bb3??) Nd4!
- Sicilian Defense – 1.e4 c5
- Sicilian Gambit (or Sicilian Wing Gambit) – 1.e4 c5 2.b4
- Slav Defense – 1.d4 d5 2.c4 c6
- Spanish Game (or Ruy Lopez) – 1.e4 e5 2.Nf3 Nc6 3.Bb5
- Stockholm Variation of the Englund Gambit – 1.d4 e5 2.dxe5 Nc6 3.Nf3 Qe7 4.Qd5
- Stockholm Variation of the Grünfeld Defense – 1.d4 Nf6 2.c4 g6 3.Nc3 d5 4.Nf3 Bg7 5.Bg5
- St. Petersburg Variation of the Nimzo-Indian Defense – 1.d4 Nf6 2.c4 e6 3.Nc3 Bb4 4.e3 b6
- St. Petersburg Variation of the Ruy Lopez – 1.e4 e5 2.Nf3 Nc6 3.Bb5 a6 4.Ba4 Nf6 5.0-0 Nxe4 6.d4 b5 7.Bb3 d5 8.dxe5 Be6 9.c3 Bc5 10.Nbd2
- Swedish Variation of the QGD, Tarrasch Defense – 1.d4 d5 2.c4 e6 3.Nc3 c5 4.cxd5 exd5 5.Nf3 Nc6 6.g3 c4
- Swiss Gambit of the Bird's Opening – 1.f4 f5 2.e4
- Swiss Variation of the French Defense – 1.e4 e6 2.d4 d5 3.Nc3 Nf6 4.Bd3

== T ==
- Tashkent Attack of the King's Gambit – 1.e4 e5 2.f4 exf4 3.Nf3 Nf6 4.e5 Nh5 5.g4
- Transylvania Variation of the Vienna Game – 1.e4 e5 2.Nc3 Nf6 3.Bc4 Nxe4 4.Qh5 Nd6 5.Bb3 Nc6 6.Nb5
- Trencianske-Teplice Gambit of the Italian Game, Two Knights Defense – 1.e4 e5 2.Nf3 Nc6 3.Bc4 Nf6 4.Ng5 Bc5 5.Bxf7+ Ke7 6.d4
- Tuebingen Variation of the Polish Opening – 1.b4 Nh6
- Tuebingen Gambit of the Dunst Opening – 1.Nc3 Nf6 2.g4
- Turkish Gambit (or the Elephant Gambit) – 1.e4 e5 2.Nf3 d5

== U ==
- Ueberlinger Gambit of the Indian Defense – 1.d4 Nf6 2.g3 e5
- Ukrainian Variation of the Old Indian Defense – 1.d4 Nf6 2.c4 d6 3.Nc3 e5

== V ==
- Valencia Opening (or Mieses Opening) – 1.d3 e5 2.Nd2
- Venezolana Variation of the Mieses Opening – 1.d3 c5 2.Nc3 Nc6 3.g3
- Venice Attack of the Sicilian Defense – 1.e4 c5 2.Nf3 d6 3.d4 cxd4 4.Nxd4 Nf6 5.f3 e5 6.Bb5+ or 1.e4 c5 2.Nf3 d6 3.d4 cxd4 4.Nxd4 Nf6 5.Nc3 e5 6.Bb5+
- Venice Variation of the Queen's Gambit Declined – 1.d4 d5 2.c4 e6 3.Nc3 Nf6 4.Bg5 c5 5.cxd5 Qb6
- Vienna Game – 1.e4 e5 2.Nc3
- Vienna Gambit – 1.e4 e5 2.Nc3 Nc6 3.f4
- Vienna Variation of the Queen's Gambit Declined – 1.d4 d5 2.c4 e6 3.Nc3 Nf6 4.Nf3 Bb4 5.Bg5 dxc4 6.e4
- Vietnamese Gambit – 1.e4 e5 2.Nf3 Nc6 3.Bc4 b5
- Vinohrady Variation of the Sicilian Defense – 1.e4 c5 2.Nc3 Nc6 3.g4 named after a district in Prague
- Volga Gambit – 1.d4 Nf6 2.c4 c5 3.d5 b5 (named for the Volga River, the national river of Russia)
- Voronezh Variation of the Alekhine's Defense – 1.e4 Nf6 2.e5 Nd5 3.d4 d6 4.c4 Nb6 5.exd6 cxd6 6.Nc3 g6 7.Be3 Bg7 8.Rc1 0-0 9.b3

== W ==
- Warsaw Variation of the Dutch Defense – 1.d4 f5 2.c4 Nf6 3.g3 g6 4.Bg2 Bg7 5.Nf3 0-0 6.0-0 d6 7.Nc3 c6
- Westphalia Defense in the Queen's Gambit Declined: An alternative name for the Manhattan Variation – 1.d4 d5 2.c4 e6 3.Nc3 Nf6 4.Bg5 Nbd7 5.Nf3 Bb4 or 5.e3 c5
- Wiesbaden Variation of the Slav Defense – 1.d4 d5 2.c4 c6 3.Nf3 Nf6 4.Nc3 dxc4 5.a4 Bf5 6.Ne5 e6
- Wilkes-Barre Variation of the Italian Game, Two Knights Defense – 1.e4 e5 2.Nf3 Nc6 3.Bc4 Nf6 4.Ng5 Bc5!?

== Y ==
- Yerevan System of the Sicilian Defense – 1.e4 c5 2.Nf3 a6 3.Nc3
- Yugoslav Attack in the Sicilian Defense, Dragon Variation – 1.e4 c5 2.Nf3 d6 3.d4 cxd4 4.Nxd4 Nf6 5.Nc3 g6 6.Be3 Bg7 7.f3
- Yugoslav Defense (or Pirc Defense) – 1.e4 d6 2.d4 Nf6 3.Nc3 g6
- Yugoslav Variation of the Benko Gambit – 1.d4 Nf6 2.c4 c5 3.d5 b5 4.cxb5 a6 5.bxa6 g6 6.Nc3 Bxa6 7.e4 Bxf1 8.Kxf1 d6 9.Nge2
- Yugoslav Variation of the King's Indian Defense – 1.d4 Nf6 2.c4 g6 3.Nc3 Bg7 4.Nf3 d6 5.g3 0-0 6.Bg2 c5

== Z ==
- Zagreb Variation of the Sicilian Defense, Najdorf Variation – 1.e4 c5 2.Nf3 d6 3.d4 cxd4 4.Nxd4 Nf6 5.Nc3 a6 6.g3
- Zaire Defense of the Queen's Knight Defense – 1.d4 Nc6 2.d5 Nb8 3.e4 Nf6 4.e5 Ng8
- Zurich Gambit – 1.d4 d5 2.g4
- Zurich Variation of the Nimzo-Indian Defense – 1.d4 Nf6 2.c4 e6 3.Nc3 Bb4 4.Qc2 Nc6

== See also ==
- Chess opening
- List of chess openings
- List of chess openings named after people
