= Saragossa Opening =

Position: a8 black rook, b8 black knight, c8 black bishop, d8 black queen, e8 black king, f8 black bishop, g8 black knight, h8 black rook, a7 black pawn, b7 black pawn, c7 black pawn, d7 black pawn, e7 black pawn, f7 black pawn, g7 black pawn, h7 black pawn, c3 white pawn, a2 white pawn, b2 white pawn, d2 white pawn, e2 white pawn, f2 white pawn, g2 white pawn, h2 white pawn, a1 white rook, b1 white knight, c1 white bishop, d1 white queen, e1 white king, f1 white bishop, g1 white knight, h1 white rook
- Moves: 1.c3
- ECO: A00

The Saragossa Opening is a chess opening defined by the opening move:

1. c3

Since White usually plays more aggressively in the opening, the Saragossa is considered an irregular opening, classified as A00 by the Encyclopaedia of Chess Openings.

== History ==
This opening became popular in the Saragossa chess club (Zaragoza, Spain) in 1919. The next year club member José Juncosa analyzed the opening in Revista del Club Argentino. In 1922 a theme tournament requiring the players to open with 1.c3 was arranged in Mannheim with three participants, Siegbert Tarrasch, Paul Leonhardt and Jacques Mieses, which Tarrasch won.

== Basics ==
The opening of 1.c3 seems at first to be an unambitious move. It opens a diagonal for the queen, but it makes only a timid claim to the center. It prepares to play d4, but White could simply have played that move immediately. Also, the pawn on c3 has the apparent disadvantage of taking the c3-square away from the knight.

It is not a terrible move, however, because it is likely to transpose into many solid systems, including a reversed Caro–Kann Defence or Slav Defense (but with an extra tempo for White); the Exchange Variation of the Queen's Gambit Declined, after 1.c3 e5 2.d4 exd4 3.cxd4 d5; to a solid but passive type of Queen's Pawn Game after 1.c3 Nf6 2.d4 or 1.c3 d5 2.d4; or to a reversed Scandinavian Defense after 1.c3 e5 2.d4 exd4 3.Qxd4!? Nc6 4.Qa4; as well as the Ponziani and Center Game openings, to name just a few. Just like 1... c6 is playable for black for any starting move from white, this is similarly true for 1. c3 - however, moves like 1. e4 and 1. d4 are considered to give white better chances for advantage due to white's first-move advantage/initiative.

Black has a number of responses, the most common (and effective) being 1...d5, 1...e5, and 1...Nf6. After 1...d5, White can essay the Plano Gambit, 2.e4?!, in effect an unusual response to the Scandinavian Defense. After 2...dxe4, 3.Qa4+ recovers the pawn, but Black gets quick development with 3...Nc6 4.Qxe4 Nf6 5.Qc2 e5. Also reasonable is 1...f5, when 2.d4 transposes into a Dutch Defense where White has played the passive move c3.

The reply 1...c5 is also playable, but gives White more opportunity than other moves to transpose into standard openings where he may have a small advantage. The move 1...c5 2.e4 transposes into the Alapin Variation of the Sicilian Defence. The sequence 1...c5 2.d4 is also possible, when 2...cxd4 (2...e6 3.e4 d5, transposing into a French Defence after 4.e5 or 4.exd5, is also possible) 3.cxd4 d5 transposes into a regular Exchange Variation of the Slav Defense (usually reached by 1.d4 d5 2.c4 c6 3.cxd5 cxd5), which gives White a slight advantage. Even 1... c6!?, copying white's idea, is perfectly playable.

Position: a8 black rook, c8 black bishop, d8 black queen, e8 black king, f8 black bishop, g8 black knight, h8 black rook, a7 black pawn, b7 black pawn, c7 black pawn, e7 black pawn, f7 black pawn, g7 black pawn, h7 black pawn, c6 black knight, d5 black pawn, d4 white pawn, c3 white pawn, a2 white pawn, b2 white pawn, e2 white pawn, f2 white pawn, g2 white pawn, h2 white pawn, a1 white rook, b1 white knight, c1 white bishop, d1 white queen, e1 white king, f1 white bishop, g1 white knight, h1 white rook

The move 1...Nc6 is also possible, as it transposes into the 1.Nc3 system (with colors reversed), where Black embarks on a plan with c6 and d5. After 2.d4 d5, Black seems to be holding the admittedly unusual position without particular difficulty.

== See also ==
- List of chess openings
- List of chess openings named after places
