= Irish Gambit =

Chess opening

Position: a8 black rook, c8 black bishop, d8 black queen, e8 black king, f8 black bishop, g8 black knight, h8 black rook, a7 black pawn, b7 black pawn, c7 black pawn, d7 black pawn, f7 black pawn, g7 black pawn, h7 black pawn, c6 black knight, e5 white knight, e4 white pawn, a2 white pawn, b2 white pawn, c2 white pawn, d2 white pawn, f2 white pawn, g2 white pawn, h2 white pawn, a1 white rook, b1 white knight, c1 white bishop, d1 white queen, e1 white king, f1 white bishop, h1 white rook
- Moves: 1.e4 e5 2.Nf3 Nc6 3.Nxe5
- ECO: C44
- Origin: Columbia Chess Chronicle (July 16, 1887)
- Parent: King's Knight Opening

The Irish Gambit is a chess opening that begins with the following moves:

1. e4 e5
2. Nf3 Nc6
3. Nxe5

== Origin ==
The chess historian Edward Winter traced the origin of the Irish Gambit to an article published in the Columbia Chess Chronicle on July 16, 1887. The author of the article claims the gambit was invented by an Irishman named Dennis O'Flaherty. The article ends with these words:

Just before his demise he was asked to explain how he ever conceived this brilliant sacrifice. "Why," he said, "you old fool, I did not see that the Pawn was protected."

The Oxford Companion to Chess contains a similar story about the origins of the gambit:

On his death bed the anonymous inventor was asked what subtlety lay behind his gambit (so the tale runs), and his last words were: "I hadn't seen the king's pawn was defended."

In 2018, the writer Shawn Gillen published an autobiographical essay entitled The Irish Gambit. Gillen begins by presenting the Irish Gambit as an ethnic joke, and goes on to compare the "[l]ogical thinking and the discipline required to play chess" to stereotypes of Irish people:

My father had also internalized some ethnic clichés about the Irish and it played into his rationale for playing chess. "We can talk and we can write," he would tell me, "and we are good at politics but there aren't any famous Irish philosophers, mathematicians, or chess players."

== Chicago Gambit ==
Chicago Gambit
Position: a8 black rook, c8 black bishop, d8 black queen, e8 black king, f8 black bishop, g8 black knight, h8 black rook, a7 black pawn, b7 black pawn, c7 black pawn, d7 black pawn, f7 black pawn, g7 black pawn, h7 black pawn, e5 black knight, d4 white pawn, e4 white pawn, a2 white pawn, b2 white pawn, c2 white pawn, f2 white pawn, g2 white pawn, h2 white pawn, a1 white rook, b1 white knight, c1 white bishop, d1 white queen, e1 white king, f1 white bishop, h1 white rook
- Moves: 1.e4 e5 2.Nf3 Nc6 3.Nxe5 Nxe5 4.d4
- ECO: C44
- Origin: Phillips vs. Pillsbury (January 7, 1899)
- Named after: Chicago, United States
- Parent: Irish Gambit

The Chicago Gambit is derived from the Irish Gambit. The Oxford Companion to Chess defines it as follows:

1. e4 e5
2. Nf3 Nc6
3. Nxe5 Nxe5
4. d4

A doctor named D. T. Phillips used the opening to defeat Harry Nelson Pillsbury in a simultaneous exhibition in Chicago on January 7, 1899.

The Oxford Companion to Chess describes the Chicago Gambit as "unsound" and compares it unfavorably to the Müller–Schulze Gambit, also known as the Halloween Gambit.

== See also ==
- List of chess openings
- List of chess openings named after places
