= Durkin Opening =

Position: a8 black rook, b8 black knight, c8 black bishop, d8 black queen, e8 black king, f8 black bishop, g8 black knight, h8 black rook, a7 black pawn, b7 black pawn, c7 black pawn, d7 black pawn, e7 black pawn, f7 black pawn, g7 black pawn, h7 black pawn, a3 white knight, a2 white pawn, b2 white pawn, c2 white pawn, d2 white pawn, e2 white pawn, f2 white pawn, g2 white pawn, h2 white pawn, a1 white rook, c1 white bishop, d1 white queen, e1 white king, f1 white bishop, g1 white knight, h1 white rook
- Moves: 1.Na3
- ECO: A00
- Named after: Robert T. Durkin
- Synonyms: Durkin Attack; Sodium Attack

The Durkin Opening, also known as the Durkin Attack or the Sodium Attack, is a rarely-played chess opening that consists of the following move:

1. Na3

The Durkin Opening is named for Robert T. Durkin (1923–2014) of New Jersey. The name "Sodium Attack" comes from the algebraic notation 1.Na3, as Na is the chemical symbol for the element sodium. Similarly, the Amar Opening (1.Nh3) is sometimes referred to as the "Ammonia Opening". White may follow up by playing c4, e.g. 1...d5 2.c4 dxc4 3.Nxc4.

== Assessment ==
This development of the queen's knight does little to utilize White's advantage of the first move. On a3, the knight does not control central squares, and White would have to move this knight again (e.g., to c2 or c4) for it to follow common opening principles, such as controlling the center. In addition, the knight on a3 runs the risk of being captured by black's dark squared bishop on f8, which could cause doubled pawns in some positions, a weakness for white, especially in the endgame. Angus Dunnington suggests that combining this move with a gradual central expansion should give White a reasonable position.

== Variations ==
- Durkin Gambit (1.Na3 e5 2.Nc4 Nc6 3. e4 f5)

== See also ==
- List of chess openings
- List of chess openings named after people

== Bibliography ==
- Benjamin, Joel; Schiller, Eric (1987). "Durkin Attack". Unorthodox Openings. Macmillan Publishing Company. pp. 103–04. ISBN 0-02-016590-0.
- Dunnington, Angus (2000). Winning Unorthodox Openings. Everyman Chess. ISBN 978-1-85744-285-4.
- Durkin, Robert (1959). N-QR3!, a new opening: the Durkin attack.
- Hooper, David; Whyld, Kenneth (1996) [1992]. "Durkin Opening". The Oxford Companion to Chess (2nd ed.). Oxford University Press. p. 117. ISBN 0-19-280049-3.
- Kasparov, Gary; Keene, Raymond (1982). Batsford Chess Openings. American Chess Promotions. ISBN 0-7134-2112-6.
- Schiller, Eric (2002). Unorthodox Chess Openings (Second ed.). Cardoza Publishing. p. 454. ISBN 1-58042-072-9.
