= Portuguese Opening =

Chess opening

Position: a8 black rook, b8 black knight, c8 black bishop, d8 black queen, e8 black king, f8 black bishop, g8 black knight, h8 black rook, a7 black pawn, b7 black pawn, c7 black pawn, d7 black pawn, f7 black pawn, g7 black pawn, h7 black pawn, b5 white bishop, e5 black pawn, e4 white pawn, a2 white pawn, b2 white pawn, c2 white pawn, d2 white pawn, f2 white pawn, g2 white pawn, h2 white pawn, a1 white rook, b1 white knight, c1 white bishop, d1 white queen, e1 white king, g1 white knight, h1 white rook
- Moves: 1.e4 e5 2.Bb5
- ECO: C20
- Parent: Open Game

The Portuguese Opening is a chess opening that begins with the moves:

1. e4 e5
2. Bb5

The Portuguese is an uncommon opening. In contrast to the Ruy Lopez (1.e4 e5 2.Nf3 Nc6 3.Bb5), by delaying Nf3, White leaves the f-pawn free to move and retains the possibility of playing f2–f4. The trade-off is that White's lack of pressure on e5 leaves Black with a freer hand.

== Lines ==
If Black replies 2...Nf6, White can try a gambit with 3.d4. Another Black reply is 2...Nc6, possibly anticipating White will transpose into the Ruy Lopez with 3.Nf3, but a more popular try is to kick White's bishop with 2...c6. The game might continue 3.Ba4 Nf6 and now White can play 4.Nc3 or 4.Qe2.

Graham Burgess remarks that it looks like a Ruy Lopez where White has forgotten to play 2.Nf3. However, the Portuguese is not as bad or nonsensical as it first appears, and Black should proceed carefully.

== See also ==
- List of chess openings
- List of chess openings named after places
