= Amar Opening =

Position: a8 black rook, b8 black knight, c8 black bishop, d8 black queen, e8 black king, f8 black bishop, g8 black knight, h8 black rook, a7 black pawn, b7 black pawn, c7 black pawn, d7 black pawn, e7 black pawn, f7 black pawn, g7 black pawn, h7 black pawn, h3 white knight, a2 white pawn, b2 white pawn, c2 white pawn, d2 white pawn, e2 white pawn, f2 white pawn, g2 white pawn, h2 white pawn, a1 white rook, b1 white knight, c1 white bishop, d1 white queen, e1 white king, f1 white bishop, h1 white rook
- Moves: 1.Nh3
- ECO: A00
- Origin: Charles Amar, Paris, 1930s
- Named after: Charles Amar
- Synonyms: Paris Opening; Drunken Knight Opening; Ammonia Opening

The Amar Opening (also known as the Paris Opening, or the Drunken Knight Opening) is a chess opening defined by the move:

1. Nh3

Analogous to calling the Durkin Opening the "Sodium Attack," this opening could be called the Ammonia Opening, since the algebraic notation 1.Nh3 resembles the chemical formula NH_{3} for ammonia. The Parisian amateur Charles Amar played it in the 1930s. It was probably named by Savielly Tartakower who used both names for this opening, although the chess author Tim Harding has jokingly suggested that "Amar" is an acronym for "Absolutely mad and ridiculous".

Since 1.Nh3 is considered an irregular opening, it is classified under the A00 code in the Encyclopaedia of Chess Openings.

== Assessment ==
Like the Durkin Opening, White develops a knight to the edge of the board, where it does not control central squares. Black's most common reply is 1...d5 which threatens 2...Bxh3, ruining White's kingside pawn structure through doubled pawns. White usually plays 2.g3 to prevent this, when Black can continue to occupy the center with 2...e5.

World champion Magnus Carlsen used the Amar Opening to defeat Aleksey Dreev in a game played at rapid time controls in the 2018 online PRO Chess League.

== Named variations ==
There are several named variations in the Amar Opening. The most well-known one is known as the Paris Gambit: 1.Nh3 d5 2.g3 e5 3.f4?! Bxh3 4.Bxh3 exf4. In the Paris Gambit, White allows Black a firm grip on the center, and also gives up material. Therefore, the gambit is considered dubious. The only named variation in the Paris Gambit is the Gent Gambit: 5.0-0 fxg3 6.hxg3. This variation was first played by Tartakower against Andor Lilienthal in Paris, 1933.
