= Wing Gambit =

Position: a8 black rook, b8 black knight, c8 black bishop, d8 black queen, e8 black king, f8 black bishop, g8 black knight, h8 black rook, a7 black pawn, b7 black pawn, d7 black pawn, e7 black pawn, f7 black pawn, g7 black pawn, h7 black pawn, c5 black pawn, b4 white pawn, e4 white pawn, a2 white pawn, c2 white pawn, d2 white pawn, f2 white pawn, g2 white pawn, h2 white pawn, a1 white rook, b1 white knight, c1 white bishop, d1 white queen, e1 white king, f1 white bishop, g1 white knight, h1 white rook
- Moves: 1.e4 c5 2.b4
- ECO: B20
- Named after: Position description
- Parent: Sicilian Defence

In chess, the name Wing Gambit has been given to a few opening lines in which White plays an early b4, deflecting an enemy pawn or bishop from c5 on the queen's wing so as to regain control of d4, an important central square.

The most common of these is the Wing Gambit in the Sicilian Defence (1.e4 c5 2.b4).

== Against the Sicilian Defence ==
The Wing Gambit in the Sicilian Defence runs 1.e4 c5 2.b4. After Black takes with 2...cxb4, the usual continuation is 3.a3 bxa3 (3...d5! is more recently considered superior, when White must avoid 4.exd5 Qxd5 5.axb4?? Qe5+ winning the rook, a blunder actually seen in tournament play in Shirazi–Peters, Berkeley 1984; instead 5.Nf3 is better) and now the main line is 4.Nxa3, though 4.Bxa3 and 4.d4 are also seen. It is also possible to decline (or at least delay acceptance of) the gambit with 2...d5.

For the pawn, White gets quicker development and a central advantage, but it is not generally considered one of White's better choices against the Sicilian and it is virtually never seen at the professional level. Among amateurs it is more common, though still not so popular as other systems.

After Black's 2...cxb4, another popular third move alternative for White is 3.d4. Grandmasters George Koltanowski, David Bronstein and World Champion Alexander Alekhine have played this line.

White can postpone the gambit one move by playing the Wing Gambit Deferred, playing 2.Nf3 followed by 3.b4. The deferred Wing Gambit is considered to be best when Black responds 2...e6. The Portsmouth Gambit runs 2.Nf3 Nc6 3.b4, where Black is disinclined to refuse the gambit due to the positional threat 4.b5, displacing the knight and disrupting Black's smooth development.

It is also possible to prepare 3.b4 by playing 2.a3!?

== Bishop's Opening ==
In the Bishop's Opening, 1.e4 e5 2.Bc4 Bc5 3.b4 is also sometimes called the Wing Gambit. It was introduced by Alexander McDonnell during the 24th match game against Louis-Charles Mahé de La Bourdonnais in 1834.

== Illustrative games ==
Lutz vs. de Firmian, Biel 1993
1.e4 c5 2.b4 cxb4 3.a3 d5! 4.exd5 Qxd5 5.Nf3 e5 6.axb4 Bxb4 7.c3 Be7 8.Na3 Nf6 9.Nb5 Qd8 10.Nxe5 Nc6 11.Nxc6 bxc6 12.Qf3 Bd7 13.Nd4 0-0 14.Ba6 Qc7 15.h3 c5 16.Nf5 Qe5 17.Ne3 Bd6 18.Be2 Bc7 19.Nc4 Qe6 20.Qe3 Ne4 21.0-0 Rfe8 22.Bd3 f5 23.Re1 Qd5 24.Qf3 Bb5 25.Nb2 c4 26.Bf1 Bb6 27.Nd1 f4 28.Qxf4 Nxf2 29.Ne3 Nd3 30.Bxd3 Qxd3 31.Kh1 Re4 32.Qg5 Bc6 33.Bb2 Qxd2 34.Rad1 Rxe3 25.Rxd2 Rxh3# 0–1

== Sources ==
- Sicilian Wing Gambit / Roman Blahut, 2018 / 268 p.
- Hooper, David; Whyld, Kenneth (1996) [First pub. 1992]. The Oxford Companion to Chess (2nd ed.). Oxford University Press. ISBN 0-19-280049-3.
