= Center Game =

Position: a8 black rook, b8 black knight, c8 black bishop, d8 black queen, e8 black king, f8 black bishop, g8 black knight, h8 black rook, a7 black pawn, b7 black pawn, c7 black pawn, d7 black pawn, f7 black pawn, g7 black pawn, h7 black pawn, e5 black pawn, d4 white pawn, e4 white pawn, a2 white pawn, b2 white pawn, c2 white pawn, f2 white pawn, g2 white pawn, h2 white pawn, a1 white rook, b1 white knight, c1 white bishop, d1 white queen, e1 white king, f1 white bishop, g1 white knight, h1 white rook
1.e4 e5 2.d4
Position: a8 black rook, b8 black knight, c8 black bishop, d8 black queen, e8 black king, f8 black bishop, g8 black knight, h8 black rook, a7 black pawn, b7 black pawn, c7 black pawn, d7 black pawn, f7 black pawn, g7 black pawn, h7 black pawn, d4 white queen, e4 white pawn, a2 white pawn, b2 white pawn, c2 white pawn, f2 white pawn, g2 white pawn, h2 white pawn, a1 white rook, b1 white knight, c1 white bishop, e1 white king, f1 white bishop, g1 white knight, h1 white rook
1.e4 e5 2.d4 exd4 3.Qxd4
- ECO: C22
- Parent: Open Game
- Synonym: Center Gambit

The Center Game is a chess opening that begins with the moves:

1. e4 e5
2. d4

White strikes in the center, attacking Black's e-pawn and aiming to open lines for rapid development. The most common continuation is the exchange 2...exd4 3.Qxd4, which is also a narrower alternative definition of the Center Game. Black's usual response is 3...Nc6, which develops with a gain of tempo, as White must move the queen a second time. Alternatives to the main line include 3.c3, the Danish Gambit.

== History ==
The Center Game is an old opening from 1590 or earlier. Phillipp Stamma first analyzed it in 1745. Siegbert Tarrasch, Mikhail Chigorin, and Wilfried Paulsen regularly played it in the late 1800s, coming up with new ideas for White. It was mostly abandoned after 1900 because no advantage could be demonstrated for White. Jacques Mieses, Sultan Khan, Savielly Tartakower, and Rudolf Spielmann were the last strong players who would adopt it in the first half of the 20th century. The Center Game was rarely played by elite players until Alexander Shabalov revived it in the 1990s. Later, Alexei Shirov, Michael Adams, Judit Polgár, and Alexander Morozevich also contributed to the theory of the Center Game by forcing re-evaluation of lines long thought to favor Black. After 2010, Ian Nepomniachtchi also experimented with the opening. In recent years, Arjun Erigaisi has played the Center Game on several occasions. The opening remains particularly suitable for faster time controls, as White often gets an attractive attack against Black's king.

== Main line: 2...exd4 3.Qxd4 Nc6 4.Qe3 Nf6 ==
The best move for the queen seems to be 4.Qe3, which has been called the Paulsen Attack. The position of White's queen hinders Black's ability to play ...d5. From e3, the queen may later move to g3, where pressure would be exerted on the square g7, defended only by Black's bishop. Black's usual reply is 4...Nf6, where 5.e5, which can be met with 5...Ng4, is considered a reckless move. More common are 5.Nc3, the traditional move, and 5.Bd2.

=== Main line: 5.Nc3 Bb4 6.Bd2 0-0 7.0-0-0 Re8 ===
Position: a8 black rook, c8 black bishop, d8 black queen, e8 black rook, g8 black king, a7 black pawn, b7 black pawn, c7 black pawn, d7 black pawn, f7 black pawn, g7 black pawn, h7 black pawn, c6 black knight, f6 black knight, b4 black bishop, e4 white pawn, c3 white knight, g3 white queen, a2 white pawn, b2 white pawn, c2 white pawn, d2 white bishop, f2 white pawn, g2 white pawn, h2 white pawn, c1 white king, d1 white rook, f1 white bishop, g1 white knight, h1 white rook

Paulsen's Attack, position after 8.Qg3

After 5.Nc3, the main line continues 5...Bb4 6.Bd2 0-0 7.0-0-0 Re8. White may try to complicate play by means of Tarrasch's pawn sacrifice 8.Qg3!? (diagram) intending 8...Rxe4 9.a3!, Shabalov's move. Even though this line gives White some compensation for the pawn, it is probably fine for Black. White can also try Judit Polgar's move 8.Qf4, intending a later f3, g4, and Qf4–g3. The old move 8.Bc4, first played by Szymon Winawer, is Nepomniachtchi's preferred approach. This leads to complex but equal play. Arne Moll wrote that the "fact that this line is objectively equal makes it more suitable for a serious game."

=== 5.Nc3 Be7 ===
A more solid but less active alternative to 5...Bb4 for Black is 5...Be7, intending ...d7–d5 (sometimes even after White plays 6.Bc4), opening up lines as soon as possible.

=== 5.Bd2 ===
5.Bd2 is a more modern alternative to 5.Nc3 which has been described as safer for White.

== Deviations from the main line ==
=== Black's fourth-move alternatives ===
There are some other possibilities besides 4...Nf6. Black also seems to get a good game with 4...g6, and 4...Bb4+ has been played successfully as well.

=== White's fourth-move alternatives ===
On move 4, White can also try 4.Qc4 and 4.Qd3, which have long been neglected by analysts, but which, according to Moll, "open up an exciting and largely brand-new area of investigation with lots of concrete lines, novel ideas and unfinished discussions". 4.Qa4, which corresponds to a fairly commonly played variation of the Scandinavian Defense (1.e4 d5 2.exd5 Qxd5 3.Nc3 Qa5) reversed, is possible but rare in the Center Game because tournament experience has not been favorable for White in the line.

=== Black's third-move alternatives ===
Black has some rarely seen alternatives to 3...Nc6:

- 3...Nf6 often transposes to the main line after 4.Nc3 Nc6. Alternatively, Soszynski suggests 4.Bg5 Nc6 (other fourth moves seem to give White an advantage) 5.Qe3 h6 6.Bxf6 Qxf6 7.Nc3, followed by either 7...Bb4 8.Nge2 or 7...b6 8.f4; 4.e5?! is considered inferior.
- 3...Qf6 hopes for 4.Qxf6 Nxf6, where Black develops at the same time as recapturing. White should avoid this, such as with 4.Qc4 or the more common 4.Qe3.
- 3...c5?! is well met by 4.Qe5+!, where after 4...Qe7 5.Qxe7 Bxe7 6.Nc3, White has an advantage; however, 4.Qe3 is more common.
- 3...d6 is passive and blocks the development of Black's king's bishop to an active square.

=== 3.Nf3 ===
Postponing recapture of the queen pawn is a standard idea in the Scandinavian Defense (1.e4 d5 2.exd5 Nf6), but 3.Nf3 is less commonly played after 2...exd4. Black can safely transpose to the Scotch Game, Petrov's Defense, or the Philidor Defense, or play 3...c5 4.Bc4 b5 (the Kieseritzky Variation) or a line recommended by Alexander Alekhine, 3...Bc5 4.Nxd4 Nf6 and now 5.e5 would be met with 5...Qe7.

=== Danish Gambit: 3.c3 ===
3.c3, the Danish Gambit, also known as the Nordic Gambit, offers a pawn sacrifice. If Black accepts the pawn with 3...dxc3, White often offers a second pawn by playing 4.Bc4, inviting 4...cxb2 5.Bxb2, leading to a position where White has a strong lead in development. Alternatively, 4.Nxc3, sacrificing only one pawn, can be played, and Black can also decline either the first or the second pawn.

=== 3.Bc4 ===
Similar ideas to those after 3.Nf3 are possible after 3.Bc4, which is less common than 3.Nf3. 3.Bc4 is referred to in older chess works as the Center Gambit. Common continuations include 3...Nc6 4.Nf3, transposing to the Scotch Gambit, and 3...Nf6 4.Nf3, transposing to the Urusov Gambit. An independent possibility is 3...Bb4, typically continuing 4.c3 dxc3 5.bxc3, after which Black can either retreat the bishop or play 5...Qf6, where White may offer an exchange sacrifice with 6.cxb4 Qxa1.

=== Halasz Gambit: 3.f4 ===
The Halasz Gambit, 3.f4?!, is another rare try. Although the move dates back to at least 1840, it has been championed more recently by the Hungarian correspondence player Dr. György Halasz. The gambit has been described as dubious but it has not been definitively refuted.

=== Black's second-move alternatives ===
Though 2...exd4 is by far the most common response to 2.d4, Black has some alternatives:

- 2...Nc6 transposes to a line in the Nimzowitsch Defense more often reached via 1...Nc6 2.d4 e5. White has the option to transpose to the Scotch Game with 3.Nf3, while 3.d5 and 3.dxe5 are also common. After 3.dxe5 Nxe5, 4.Nf3 is a strong option with the common replies 4...Nxf3+, 4...Bb4+, 4...Qf6, and 4...d6. Alternatively, White can play 4.Qd4, which leaves Black with nothing better than 4...Nc6, transposing to the main line of the Center Game. 4.f4 and 4.Nc3 are also seen.
- 2...d6 tends to transpose into the Philidor Defense after 3.Nf3, while also offering White the option to exchange queens early with 3.dxe5 dxe5 4.Qxd8+ Kxd8, frequently followed by 5.Bc4 f6; White only has a slight advantage in this endgame.
- 2...Nf6 is dubious and can be answered with 3.dxe5 Nxe4 4.Qe2. Alternatively, 3.Nf3 transposes to the Steinitz Variation of Petrov's Defense.
- 2...d5, the Beyer Gambit, is also dubious and well met by 3.dxe5.
