= Halloween Gambit =

Chess opening

Position: a8 black rook, c8 black bishop, d8 black queen, e8 black king, f8 black bishop, h8 black rook, a7 black pawn, b7 black pawn, c7 black pawn, d7 black pawn, f7 black pawn, g7 black pawn, h7 black pawn, c6 black knight, f6 black knight, e5 white knight, e4 white pawn, c3 white knight, a2 white pawn, b2 white pawn, c2 white pawn, d2 white pawn, f2 white pawn, g2 white pawn, h2 white pawn, a1 white rook, c1 white bishop, d1 white queen, e1 white king, f1 white bishop, h1 white rook
- Moves: 1.e4 e5 2.Nf3 Nc6 3.Nc3 Nf6 4.Nxe5
- ECO: C47
- Parent: Four Knights Game
- Synonyms: Müller–Schulze Gambit; Leipzig Gambit

The Halloween Gambit (also known as the Müller–Schulze Gambit or Leipzig Gambit) is an aggressive chess opening gambit in which White sacrifices a knight early on for a single pawn. The opening is an offshoot of the normally staid Four Knights Game and is defined by the moves:

1. e4 e5
2. Nf3 Nc6
3. Nc3 Nf6
4. Nxe5?!

The theoretician Oskar Cordel reported in 1888 that Leipzig club players used the opening to dangerous effect, but he did not believe it was sound. Their name for it, Gambit Müller und Schulze, was not after any players by those names, but rather a jocular German equivalent of "Smith and Jones" or "Tom, Dick, and Harry". The modern name "Halloween Gambit" was given by the German player Steffen Jakob, who explained that "Many players are shocked, the way they would be frightened by a Halloween mask, when they are mentally prepared for a boring Four Knight's, and then they are faced with Nxe5."

White's objective is to seize the center with pawns and drive back Black's knights. After 4... Nxe5, White usually plays 5. d4 (5.f4 does nothing for development), after which Black can retreat the attacked knight to either g6 or c6.

== 5...Ng6 retreat ==
Position: a8 black rook, c8 black bishop, d8 black queen, e8 black king, f8 black bishop, g8 black knight, h8 black rook, a7 black pawn, b7 black pawn, c7 black pawn, d7 black pawn, f7 black pawn, g7 black pawn, h7 black pawn, g6 black knight, e5 white pawn, c4 white bishop, d4 white pawn, c3 white knight, a2 white pawn, b2 white pawn, c2 white pawn, f2 white pawn, g2 white pawn, h2 white pawn, a1 white rook, c1 white bishop, d1 white queen, e1 white king, h1 white rook

Position after 5...Ng6 6.e5 Ng8 7.Bc4

When Black retreats 5...Ng6, White chases the f6-knight with 6.e5. Then after 6...Ng8 7.Bc4, former world champion Max Euwe recommended 7...d5 8.Bxd5 c6, contending in volume 11 of his opening series that Black has a decisive advantage. Grandmaster (GM) Larry Kaufman recommends instead 8...N8e7 in this line, but prefers the 5...Nc6 lines, saying that 5...Ng6 "should also be good but is unnecessarily risky".

Instead of holding on to the extra piece with the usual 6...Ng8, a more logical continuation according to Eric Schiller is 6...Bb4, giving Black the better game after 7.exf6 Qxf6 with a lead in development and pressure in the center.

== 5...Nc6 retreat ==
When Black retreats 5...Nc6, White chases the knight again with 6.d5. Then Black has 6...Ne5 (the Main line), or 6...Bb4 (Piński's move).

=== 6...Ne5 ===
Position: a8 black rook, c8 black bishop, d8 black queen, e8 black king, f8 black bishop, g8 black knight, h8 black rook, a7 black pawn, b7 black pawn, d7 black pawn, f7 black pawn, g7 black pawn, h7 black pawn, d6 white pawn, g6 black knight, f4 white pawn, c3 white knight, a2 white pawn, b2 white pawn, c2 white pawn, g2 white pawn, h2 white pawn, a1 white rook, c1 white bishop, d1 white queen, e1 white king, f1 white bishop, h1 white rook

After 5...Nc6 6.d5 Ne5 7.f4 Ng6 8.e5 Ng8 9.d6 cxd6 10.exd6

After 6...Ne5, White chases again with 7.f4. Then after 7...Ng6 the game usually continues 8.e5 Ng8 9.d6 cxd6 10.exd6 (see diagram). In this case White's attack is very dangerous, and likely to prevail in practical play, with the threat of Nb5–c7 difficult to defend satisfactorily. Precise defense may theoretically preserve Black's material advantage but White has achieved their opening objectives.

=== Piński's 6...Bb4 ===
Position: a8 black rook, c8 black bishop, d8 black queen, e8 black king, h8 black rook, a7 black pawn, b7 black pawn, c7 black pawn, d7 black pawn, f7 black pawn, g7 black pawn, h7 black pawn, c6 black knight, f6 black knight, d5 white pawn, b4 black bishop, e4 white pawn, c3 white knight, a2 white pawn, b2 white pawn, c2 white pawn, f2 white pawn, g2 white pawn, h2 white pawn, a1 white rook, c1 white bishop, d1 white queen, e1 white king, f1 white bishop, h1 white rook

After 5...Nc6 6.d5 Bb4

GM Larry Kaufman wrote in 2004 that the Müller–Schulze Gambit is refuted by 4...Nxe5 5.d4 Nc6 6.d5 Bb4! 7.dxc6 Nxe4 8.Qd4 Qe7, which he attributes to the Polish IM Jan Piński. In 2003, Piński analyzed 9.Qxg7 (there is also the defensive resource 9.Be3 and after 9...0-0 10.Bd3 Nxc3 11.bxc3 Bd6 12.cxb7 Bxb7 13.0-0 White has equalized the material but Black has more open lines and can take control quicker being a tempo up; Kaufman wrote in 2020 that after 13...Rfe8 14.Rab1 Bc6, "White has no compensation for his poor pawn structure") 9...Nxc3+ 10.Be3 Nd5+ 11.c3 Rf8 12.cxb4 Nxe3 13.fxe3 Qxb4+, concluding "Black is very close to winning".

== Halloween Gambit with colors reversed ==
A similar gambit can be tried by Black: after 4.g3, Black can play 4...Nxe4!? This line is arguably sounder than its White counterpart because White's 4.g3 has weakened the f3-square. Moreover, White cannot play the line recommended by Kaufman with colors reversed, because 5.Nxe4 d5 6.Nc3 d4 7.Bb5? dxc3 8.Nxe5? Qd5 9.Qe2? loses to 9...Qxh1+. However, with the pawn on g3, Nh4 is possible and it should be easier to castle.

== Illustrative games ==
The following speed chess games (played by Brause, a chess computer) show what can befall an unprepared player of the black pieces:

- Brause vs. N.N., German Internet Chess Server 1997
  1. e4 e5 2. Nf3 Nc6 3. Nc3 Nf6 4. Nxe5 Nxe5 5. d4 Ng6 6. e5 Ng8 7. Bc4 c6 8. Qf3 f6 9. 0-0 d5 10. exd6e.p. Bxd6 11. Ne4 N8e7? 12. Qxf6!! gxf6? 13. Nxf6+ Kf8 14. Bh6# 1–0
- Brause vs. N.N., Internet Chess Club 1997
  1. e4 e5 2. Nf3 Nc6 3. Nc3 Nf6 4. Nxe5 Nxe5 5. d4 Nc6 6. d5 Nb8 7. e5 Ng8 8. d6 Nc6 9. Nb5 cxd6 10. exd6 Bxd6? (10...Qf6) 11. Qxd6 Qe7+ 12. Be3 Qxd6 13. Nxd6+ Kf8 14. Bc4 Ne5 15. Bb3 Ne7 16. 0-0-0 f6 17. f4 Ng4 18. Rhe1 (threatening 19.Bc5 and 20.Nxc8 Rxc8 21.Rxd7) 1–0

The next game, played in a Halloween Gambit thematic tournament, won the prize for the most spectacular game won by White.

- Torrecillas (2389) vs. Keiser (1932), Email 2003
  1. e4 e5 2. Nf3 Nc6 3. Nc3 Nf6 4. Nxe5 Nxe5 5. d4 Ng6 6. e5 Ng8 7. Bc4 Bb4 8. Qf3 f6 9. 0-0 Bxc3 10. bxc3 d5 11. exd6e.p. cxd6 12. Ba3 N8e7 13. Rfe1 Qc7 14. Bb3 Kd8 15. c4 Bd7 16. Rad1 Qc6 17. Qc3 a5 18. d5 Qc7 19. c5 b5 20. Qd2 b4 21. cxd6 Qxd6 22. Bb2 a4 23. Bc4 Ke8 24. a3 Ne5 25. Ba2 b3 26. cxb3 axb3 27. Bxb3 Kf7 28. f4 N5g6 29. Re6 Qxf4 30. Qe2 Qb8 31. Ba2 Qa7+ 32. Kh1 Kf8 33. d6 Ng8 34. Qc4 Nh6 35. Bxf6! gxf6 (35...Bxe6 36.Qxe6 gxf6 37.Qxf6+ Nf7 38.d7 mates shortly) 36. Rxf6+ Ke8 (36...Kg7 37.Qc3) 37. Rxg6 hxg6 38. Qc3 Rh7 39. Qf6 Ba4 40. Qxg6+ Nf7 41. Rf1 Bc2 (41...Bc6 42.Bxf7+ Qxf7 [42...Rxf7 43.Qg8+ Kd7 44.Rxf7+] 43.Rxf7 Rxf7 44.Qg8+ Kd7 [44...Rf8 45.Qe6+ Kd8 46.Qe7+ Kc8 47.Qc7#] 45.Qxf7+ Kxd6 46.h4+−) 42. Qxc2 1–0
