= C83 =

C83 may refer to:

- Byron Airport, a public airport serving Contra Costa County, California, USA.
- Corydoras loxozonus, a freshwater catfish.
- Ruy Lopez chess openings ECO code
- Diffuse non-Hodgkin's lymphoma ICD-10 code
- HMS Southampton (C83), a 1934 British Royal Navy cruiser
- Labour Standards (Non-Metropolitan Territories) Convention, 1947 code
- Caldwell 83 (NGC 4945), a spiral galaxy in the constellation Centaurus

C-83 may refer to:

- C-83 Coupe, an aircraft
