= C82 =

C-82 may refer to:

- C-82 Packet, a United States Army Air Forces aircraft used after World War II

C82 may refer to:

- Corydoras loxozonus, a freshwater catfish
- Ruy Lopez chess openings ECO code
- Follicular lymphoma ICD-10 code
- Social Policy (Non-Metropolitan Territories) Convention, 1947 code
- Bresson Airport, a public use airport in Compton, Illinois, FAA LID
- Caldwell 82 (NGC 6193), an open cluster in the constellation Ara
