= C80 =

C80 may refer to:

- HMS Mauritius (C80), a 1938 British Royal Navy cruiser
- Final Articles Revision Convention, 1946 code
- New Coalinga Municipal Airport FAA LID
- Ruy Lopez chess openings ECO code
- Malignant neoplasm without specification of site ICD-10 code
- Caldwell 80 (Omega Centauri or NGC 5139), a globular cluster in the constellation Centaurus
- C_{80}, carbon-80, a fullerene
