= C79 =

C79 or C-79 may refer to:

- Junkers C-79, the US military designation of the Ju 52 transport aircraft
- Corydoras loxozonus, a freshwater catfish
- C79 optical sight, a small arms telescopic sight
- Ruy Lopez chess openings ECO code
- Secondary malignant neoplasm of other sites ICD-10 code
- Night Work of Young Persons (Non-Industrial Occupations) Convention, 1946 code
- Sun/C79, a 1974 song by Cat Stevens
- Caldwell 79, a globular cluster in the constellation Vela
