= C84 =

C84 may refer to:

- Ruy Lopez chess openings ECO code
- Peripheral and cutaneous T-cell lymphomas ICD-10 code
- Right of Association (Non-Metropolitan Territories) Convention, 1947 code
- Caldwell 84 (NGC 5286), a globular cluster in the constellation Centaurus
- Condemned 84, British band
