= Tarrasch =

Tarrasch may refer to:

- Siegbert Tarrasch (1862–1934), German chess master
- Tarrasch Defense, a chess opening
  - Semi-Tarrasch Defense
- Tarrasch rule, a principle that applies to chess middlegames and endgames
- Tarrasch Trap, either of two opening traps in the Ruy Lopez
