= Contracts of Employment (Indigenous Workers) Convention, 1947 (shelved) =

International Labour Organization Convention

C86
- ILO Convention
- Date of adoption: July 11, 1947
- Date in force: February 13, 1953
- This Convention has been "shelved".
- Classification: Indigenous and Tribal Peoples
- Subject: Indigenous and Tribal Peoples
- Previous: Labour Inspectorates (Non-Metropolitan Territories) Convention, 1947
- Next: Freedom of Association and Protection of the Right to Organise Convention, 1948

Contracts of Employment (Indigenous Workers) Convention, 1947 (shelved) is an International Labour Organization Convention.

It was established in 1947 with the preamble stating:

Having decided upon the adoption of certain proposals concerning the maximum length of contracts of employment of indigenous workers,...

== Ratifications ==
Prior to its shelving, this convention was ratified by 26 states.
