= Inspection du travail =

Specialist agency of French civil service

The Inspection du travail (IT, Labour inspection) is a specialist agency of the French civil service, responsible for investigating employment conditions and enforcing labour law, created in 1892 during the Third Republic.

== History ==
The Labour inspection was officially created by the 19 May 1874 law during the Third Republic, establishing a body of 15 divisionary inspectors, and several departmental inspectors. However, they were not very efficient. Following the International Conference on Labour in Berlin on 15 March 1890, envisioning the creation of an international labour legislation, the Third Republic created by the 2 November 1892 law a specialized body of civil servants dedicated to inspection of labour conditions. It was first of all charged of the surveillance of the implementation of the 22 March 1841 law prohibiting child labour of less than 8 years old. This law had been enacted following reports by the physician René Villermé. The 1890 law also enacted a maximal length of work for children, women and underage girls.

The function was popularized by the inspector Pierre Hamp, who maintained a chronicle in L'Humanité newspaper from 1906 to 1912. Following the creation of the Ministry of Labour in 1906, the IT became one of its services.

In 1947, the 81st International Convention of the International Labour Organization forced all ratifying states to "organize a system of labour inspection". France ratified it under the Fourth Republic by a 10 August 1950 law.

In 1975, a law was introduced to limit and regulate redundancies making it compulsory for employers wishing to carry out redundancies to obtain the authorization of labour inspectors. This law was abolished in 1986 by Jacques Chirac administration.

During a routine inspection of seasonal workers on a vineyard on 2 September 2004, Claude Duviau, a farmer from Saussignac shot and killed two labour inspectors, Sylvie Trémouille and Daniel Buffière. Duviau was later found guilty of murder and sentenced to 30 years in prison. He died in custody on 26 January 2016. The shooting led to a nation-wide debate on labour inspectors' work conditions in France.

== Number of inspectors ==
There are in 2010 600 Labour Inspectors and 1219 controllers. Each year, they established approximatively 16.000 procès-verbaux, of which only a fourth lead to a sanction of the employer.

== Labor inspectors ==
Labor inspectors take an 18-month paid training course at the Institut national du travail, de l'emploi et de la formation professionnelle (INTEFP) in Marcy-l'Étoile (Auvergne-Rhône-Alpes) near Lyon. The labor inspector exam is one of the most selective category A administrative exams, with a success rate of just 6.75% in 2018.

The Institut national du travail, de l'emploi et de la formation professionnelle (INTEFP) was created in 1975, first at 83 boulevard Pasteur in Paris, then at 21 rue de la Vanne in Montrouge, before moving to Lyon in 1980. Under the direct supervision of the Ministry of Labor, the school became a public administrative establishment on January 1, 2006, under Decree no. 2005-1555 of December 13, 2005.

== See also ==
- Occupational health and safety
- Labour and employment law

== Bibliography ==
- « Comment devenir inspecteur du travail ? » Brochure éditée par le ministère de l'Emploi et de la Solidarité
- « L'Inspection du travail » de Paul Ramackers et Laurent Vilboeuf, Que sais-je?, 1997
- « On achève bien les inspecteurs du travail... » de Gérard Filoche (inspecteur du travail), Jean-Claude Gawsevitch éditeur, 2004
- « Carnets d'un inspecteur du travail » de Gérard Filoche (inspecteur du travail), éditions Ramsay, 2004
- « Le travail jetable » de Gérard Filoche (inspecteur du travail), éditions Ramsay, 1997
- « Inspection du travail et repression », Professeur Laurent Gamet, in Droit social, Dalloz, 2017
- « L'inspecteur du travail », Liaisons sociales, 11345, numéro spécial, décembre 1992
- « La création de l'inspection du travail: La condition ouvrière d'après les débats parlementaires de 1881 à 1892 » de William Grossin, L'Harmattan, 1990
- « Voltigeurs de la République : L'Inspection du travail en France jusqu'en 1914 » de V. Viet, CNRS editions, 2003
- « Inspecteurs et inspection du travail sous la IIIe et la IVe République » de Collectif, La documentation française, 1998
- « L'inspection du travail en France en 1998. les chiffres clés » de Collectif, La Documentation Française, 2000
- « L'Inspection du travail », Bureau international du travail, 2000
- Gérard Lyon-Caen et Jacques Pellissier, Droit du travail, Dalloz, 1996
- Marie-Thérèse Join-Lambert, Politiques sociales, Presses de Sciences-Po et Dalloz, 1997
- Marie-Thérèse Join-Lambert, Pierre Hamp: inspecteur du travail et écrivain humaniste, L'Harmattan, 2006, ISBN 9782747596688
