= Labour Inspection Convention, 1947 =

International Labour Organization Convention

C81
- ILO Convention
- Date of adoption: July 11, 1947
- Date in force: April 7, 1950
- Classification: Labour Inspection
- Subject: Labour Administration and Inspection
- Previous: Final Articles Revision Convention, 1946
- Next: Social Policy (Non-Metropolitan Territories) Convention, 1947

The Labour Inspection Convention, 1947 (No. 81), also referred to as ILO Convention no. 81 or C081, is a governance convention adopted by the International Labour Organization on July 11, 1947. It entered into force on April 7, 1950 and has been ratified by 148 of the 186 ILO member states as of 2021. The convention sets out principles concerning the organization, functions, and operation of labour inspection systems to ensure enforcement of national laws related to working conditions and worker protections in the commercial and industrial sectors. A Protocol adopted in 1995 expands the coverage of Convention No. 81 to non-commercial or industrial sectors.

== Scope ==
Convention No. 81 requires ratifying countries to maintain labour inspection systems for workplaces in industry and commerce. The convention's provisions apply to workplaces where legal provisions related to working conditions and worker protections are enforceable by labour inspectors. Countries can exempt mining and transport industries or parts thereof via national laws or regulations if they wish.

The Protocol of 1995 expands the scope to cover workplaces in non-commercial services sectors not previously considered industrial or commercial. This includes sectors like healthcare, education, cultural/recreational services, etc. Ratifying countries can exclude categories like essential government administration, armed services, police, and prisons from the Protocol's coverage if it would cause substantial difficulties. However, they must provide justification and alternate inspection arrangements for excluded categories as far as possible.

== Key Provisions ==
The Labour Inspection Convention outlines principles concerning:

- Functions - Enforcing legal provisions related to working conditions and worker protections (hours, wages, safety, health, child labour); providing technical guidance to employers/workers; identifying gaps or defects in laws.
- Organization - Labour inspection placed under supervision of a central authority; cooperation between inspection services and other government agencies or institutions.
- Labour Inspectors - Qualifications and training requirements; powers to freely enter workplaces, conduct examinations and interviews, require documentation; independence and security of tenure.
- Inspection Visits - Workplaces to be inspected as often as necessary; inspectors empowered to check compliance, issue remediation orders, address health/safety risks
- Reporting - Periodic reports from local offices to central authority; central authority publishes an annual inspection report.
- Penalties - Adequate penalties and legal proceedings for violations or obstruction; exceptions can be made for warnings/advice.

== Protocol of 1995 ==
The Protocol of 1995 expands Convention No. 81 to cover non-commercial services sectors not previously subject to labour inspection. Countries ratifying the Protocol must extend their labour inspection systems to sectors like healthcare, education, recreation/culture, etc.

Scope exclusions are permitted for categories like government administration, military, and prisons if it would cause major difficulties. However, the reasons must be explained and alternate inspection arrangements established where possible. The Protocol also allows adaptations to inspection procedures and labour inspectors' powers when applied to excluded categories.

Other special inspection arrangements are permitted for fire brigades, rescue services, police and corrections institutions to account for their particular work contexts. Overall the Protocol aims to ensure the non-commercial sector has equally thorough labour inspection coverage.

== Ratifications ==
As of 2026, 151 of the 186 ILO states had ratified the convention. The Protocol of 1995, which came into effect in 1998, was rafified by 12 countries as of 2024.
