= Ruy Lopez, Noah's Ark Trap =

Chess opening trap

The Noah's Ark Trap is a family of traps in the Ruy Lopez chess opening in which a white bishop is trapped on the b3-square by black pawns.

The origin of the name is uncertain. The shape of the black pawns on a6, b5, and c4 may resemble an ark, or the name may suggest that the trap is "as old as Noah's Ark".

== The trap ==
Steiner vs. Capablanca, 1929

Position: a8 black rook, d8 black queen, e8 black king, f8 black bishop, g8 black knight, h8 black rook, d7 black bishop, f7 black pawn, g7 black pawn, h7 black pawn, a6 black pawn, d6 black pawn, b5 black pawn, d5 white queen, c4 black pawn, e4 white pawn, b3 white bishop, a2 white pawn, b2 white pawn, c2 white pawn, f2 white pawn, g2 white pawn, h2 white pawn, a1 white rook, b1 white knight, c1 white bishop, e1 white king, h1 white rook

Position after 11...c4. The white king bishop is trapped.

Chess masters have occasionally fallen victim to this trap. An example is a game between Endre Steiner and José Capablanca at the Budapest tournament in 1929:

1. e4 e5 2. Nf3 Nc6 3. Bb5 a6 4. Ba4 d6 5. d4

Better moves for White are 5.c3, 5.Bxc6+, and 5.0-0.

5... b5 6. Bb3 Nxd4 7. Nxd4 exd4 8. Qxd4??

Alexander Alekhine recommended this move in the tournament book for New York 1924 as a means for White to draw, but it is a mistake that loses material. White should instead play 8.Bd5 or try a gambit with 8.c3.

8... c5 9. Qd5 Be6 10. Qc6+ Bd7 11. Qd5 c4 (see diagram)

The white king bishop is trapped. White resigned after 32 moves.

=== In the Sicilian ===
A variation of this trap can occur in the Sicilian Defence after the moves 1. e4 c5 2. Nf3 Nc6 3. Bb5 (the Rossolimo Variation) 3... a6 4. Ba4?? (4.Bxc6 is necessary and is the point of 3.Bb5) 4... b5 5. Bb3 c4 (see diagram). The bishop is similarly trapped.

Position: a8 black rook, c8 black bishop, d8 black queen, e8 black king, f8 black bishop, g8 black knight, h8 black rook, d7 black pawn, e7 black pawn, f7 black pawn, g7 black pawn, h7 black pawn, a6 black pawn, c6 black knight, b5 black pawn, c4 black pawn, e4 white pawn, b3 white bishop, f3 white knight, a2 white pawn, b2 white pawn, c2 white pawn, d2 white pawn, f2 white pawn, g2 white pawn, h2 white pawn, a1 white rook, b1 white knight, c1 white bishop, d1 white queen, e1 white king, h1 white rook

Position after 4.Ba4?? b5 5.Bb3 c4 in the Rossolimo Variation of the Sicilian Defence
