= Labour Inspectorates (Non-Metropolitan Territories) Convention, 1947 =

International Labour Organization Convention

C85
- ILO Convention
- Date of adoption: July 11, 1947
- Date in force: July 26, 1955
- Classification: Workers in Non-Metropolitan Territories
- Subject: Labour Administration and Inspection
- Previous: Right of Association (Non-Metropolitan Territories) Convention, 1947
- Next: Contracts of Employment (Indigenous Workers) Convention, 1947 (shelved)

Labour Inspectorates (Non-Metropolitan Territories) Convention, 1947 is an International Labour Organization Convention.

It was established in 1947 with the preamble stating:

Having decided upon the adoption of certain proposals concerning labour inspectorates in non-metropolitan territories,...

== Ratifications ==
As of 2013, the convention has been ratified by 11 states. One state—Australia—has subsequently denounced the convention. It is in force in Tanzania based on the ratification of Zanzibar, which took place two days before Zanzibar merged with Tanganyika to form Tanzania.
