= Social Policy (Non-Metropolitan Territories) Convention, 1947 =

International Labour Organization Convention

C82
- ILO Convention
- Date of adoption: July 11, 1947
- Date in force: June 19, 1955
- Classification: Economic and Social Policy
- Subject: Social Policy
- Previous: Labour Inspection Convention, 1947
- Next: Labour Standards (Non-Metropolitan Territories) Convention, 1947

Social Policy (Non-Metropolitan Territories) Convention, 1947 is an International Labour Organization Convention.

It was established in 1947 with the preamble stating:

Having decided upon the adoption of certain proposals concerning social policy in non-metropolitan territories,...

== Ratifications ==
As of 2013, the convention has been ratified by four states: Belgium, France, New Zealand, and the United Kingdom.
