= Final Articles Revision Convention, 1946 =

International Labour Organization Convention

C80
- ILO Convention
- Date of adoption: October 9, 1946
- Date in force: May 28, 1947
- Classification: General Provisions
- Subject: Not Classified
- Previous: Night Work of Young Persons (Non-Industrial Occupations) Convention, 1946
- Next: Labour Inspection Convention, 1947

Final Articles Revision Convention, 1946 is an International Labour Organization Convention.

It was established in 1946 with the preamble stating:

Having decided upon the adoption of certain proposals with regard to the partial revision of the Conventions adopted by the Conference at its first twenty-eight sessions for the purpose of making provision for the future discharge of certain chancery functions entrusted by the said Conventions to the Secretary-General of the League of Nations and introducing therein certain further amendments consequential upon the dissolution of the League of Nations and the amendment of the Constitution of the International Labour Organisation,...

== Ratifications ==
As of 2013, the convention has been ratified by 57 states.
