= Labour Standards (Non-Metropolitan Territories) Convention, 1947 =

International Labour Organization Convention

C83
- ILO Convention
- Date of adoption: July 11, 1947
- Date in force: June 15, 1974
- Classification: Workers in Non-Metropolitan Territories
- Subject: Specific Categories of Workers
- Previous: Social Policy (Non-Metropolitan Territories) Convention, 1947
- Next: Right of Association (Non-Metropolitan Territories) Convention, 1947

Labour Standards (Non-Metropolitan Territories) Convention, 1947 is an International Labour Organization Convention.

It was established in 1947 with the preamble stating:

Having decided upon the adoption of certain proposals concerning the application of international labour standards in non-metropolitan territories,...

== Ratifications ==
The treaty has been ratified only by the United Kingdom in 1950 and Australia in 1973. Australia has subsequently denounced the treaty, making it currently in force only for the United Kingdom.
