= Ruy Lopez, Tarrasch Trap =

Chess opening trap

Tarrasch Trap refers to two different chess opening traps in the Ruy Lopez that are named for Siegbert Tarrasch. Unlike many variations that appear only in analysis, Tarrasch actually sprung his traps against masters in tournament games.

== Tarrasch Trap in the Open Defence ==
Two world championship challengers actually fell for this trap against Tarrasch: Johannes Zukertort at Frankfurt in 1887 and Isidor Gunsberg at Manchester in 1890.

1. e4 e5 2. Nf3 Nc6 3. Bb5 a6 4. Ba4 Nf6 5. 0-0 Nxe4

This is the Open Defence of the Ruy Lopez.

Position: a8 black rook, f8 black rook, g8 black king, c7 black pawn, d7 black queen, e7 black bishop, f7 black pawn, g7 black pawn, h7 black pawn, a6 black pawn, c6 black knight, e6 black bishop, b5 black pawn, d5 black pawn, e5 white pawn, d4 white knight, e4 black knight, b3 white bishop, c3 white pawn, a2 white pawn, b2 white pawn, f2 white pawn, g2 white pawn, h2 white pawn, a1 white rook, b1 white knight, c1 white bishop, d1 white queen, e1 white rook, g1 white king

Position after 11...Qd7? White wins a piece.

6. d4 b5 7. Bb3 d5 8. dxe5 Be6 9. c3 Be7 10. Re1 0-0 11. Nd4 Qd7? (see diagram)

Falling into the trap.

12. Nxe6

No matter how Black recaptures, the pawn on d5 will be pinned (along the d-file or along the a2–g8 diagonal). After 12...Qxe6 or 12...fxe6 White wins a piece with 13.Rxe4.

== Tarrasch Trap in the Steinitz Defence ==
The second Tarrasch Trap, sometimes referred to as the Dresden Trap, occurs in the Steinitz Defence. Tarrasch published analysis of this trap in 1891, but 18 months later Georg Marco fell into it in Tarrasch–Marco, Dresden 1892. Tarrasch spent just five minutes thinking during the entire game.

1. e4 e5 2. Nf3 Nc6 3. Bb5 d6

This is the Steinitz Defence of the Ruy Lopez.

4. d4 Bd7

Black breaks the pin to meet the threat of 5.d5.

Position: a8 black rook, d8 black queen, e8 black king, h8 black rook, a7 black pawn, b7 black pawn, c7 black pawn, d7 black bishop, e7 black bishop, f7 black pawn, g7 black pawn, h7 black pawn, c6 black knight, d6 black pawn, f6 black knight, b5 white bishop, e5 black pawn, d4 white pawn, e4 white pawn, c3 white knight, f3 white knight, a2 white pawn, b2 white pawn, c2 white pawn, f2 white pawn, g2 white pawn, h2 white pawn, a1 white rook, c1 white bishop, d1 white queen, e1 white rook, g1 white king

Position after 7.Re1. Now 7...0-0? falls into the trap.

5. Nc3 Nf6 6. 0-0 Be7 7. Re1 (see diagram)

Laying a subtle trap. Castling seems natural for Black but it loses a pawn. Instead, 7...exd4 is better.

7... 0-0? 8. Bxc6 Bxc6 9. dxe5 dxe5 10. Qxd8 Raxd8 11. Nxe5

Black's best move here is probably 11...Bd7, although White would remain a pawn ahead.

11... Bxe4?! 12. Nxe4 Nxe4

White can go astray too: 13.Rxe4?? would be a horrible blunder as Black would checkmate with 13...Rd1+ 14.Re1 Rxe1#. White blocks that possibility with his next move, making the threat real against the black knight on e4.

13. Nd3 f5

The black knight cannot move because of the pin against the bishop on e7.

14. f3 Bc5+?!

Better is 14...Bh4 15.g3 Nxg3 16.hxg3 Bxg3 where Black get two pawns for the knight.

15. Nxc5 Nxc5 16. Bg5 Rd5 17. Be7 Re8 18. c4 1–0

White wins at least the exchange, so Marco resigned.
