= Right of Association (Non-Metropolitan Territories) Convention =

International Labour Organization Convention

Right of Association (Non-Metropolitan Territories) Convention, 1947
C84
- ILO Convention
- Date of adoption: July 11, 1947
- Date in force: July 1, 1953
- Classification: Freedom of Association; Collective Bargaining and Agreements
- Subject: Freedom of Association, Collective Bargaining, and Industrial Relations
- Previous: Labour Standards (Non-Metropolitan Territories) Convention, 1947
- Next: Labour Inspectorates (Non-Metropolitan Territories) Convention, 1947

The Convention concerning the Right of Association and the Settlement of Labour Disputes in Non-Metropolitan Territories is an International Labour Organization Convention on the rights of workers in non-metropoliton territories (e.g. dependent territories, or DOMTOMs) to form and be active in labour unions.

== Ratifications ==
As of 2022, the convention has been ratified by nine states.

Country	Date	Status
Belgium	27 Jan 1955	In Force
Fiji	19 Apr 1974	In Force
France	26 Jul 1954	In Force
Mauritania	09 Feb 1987	In Force
Mauritius	25 Nov 1969	In Force
New Zealand	01 Jul 1952	In Force
Solomon Islands	28 May 1984	In Force
Somalia	29 May 1984	In Force
United Kingdom	27 Mar 1950	In Force

== See also ==
- Right of Association (Agriculture) Convention
