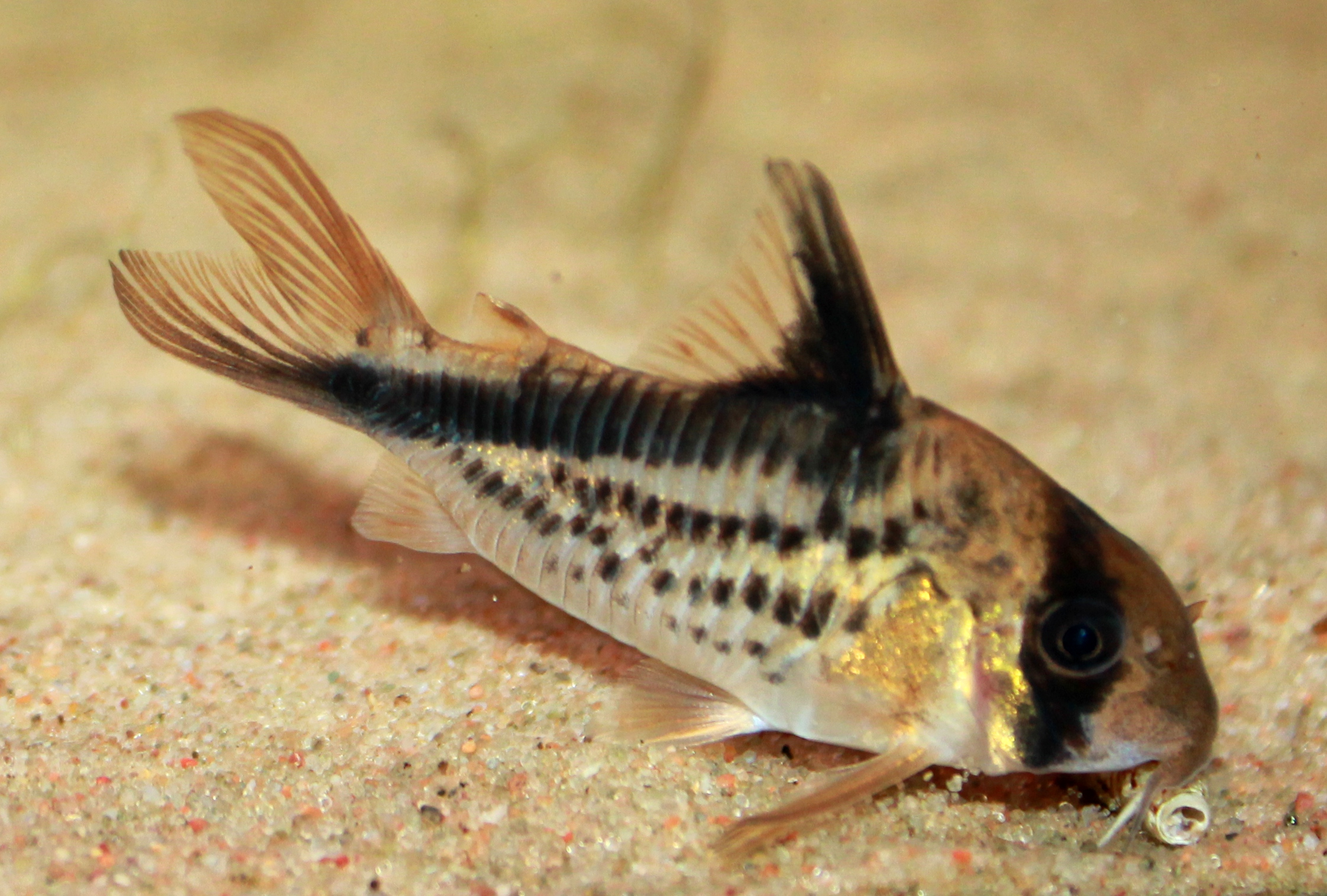

Conservation status
- Vulnerable (IUCN 3.1)

Scientific classification
- Kingdom: Animalia
- Phylum: Chordata
- Class: Actinopterygii
- Order: Siluriformes
- Family: Callichthyidae
- Genus: Corydoras
- Species: C. loxozonus

Binomial name
- Corydoras loxozonus Nijssen & Isbrücker, 1983

= Corydoras loxozonus =

Species of ray-finned fish

Corydoras loxozonus is a tropical freshwater fish belonging to the Corydoradinae sub-family of the family Callichthyidae. It originates in inland waters in South America, and is found in the Meta River basin in Colombia. In the system of "C-Numbers" developed by the German fishkeeping magazine DATZ to identify undescribed species of Corydoras in the aquarium hobby, this fish had been assigned numbers "C79", "C82", and "C83" until these stocks were correctly identified.

The fish will grow in length up to 1.9 inches (4.8 centimeters). It lives in a tropical climate in water with a 6.0 – 8.0 pH, a water hardness of 2 – 25 dGH, and a temperature range of 70–75 °F (21–24 °C). It feeds on worms, benthic crustaceans, insects, and plant matter. It lays eggs in dense vegetation and adults do not guard the eggs. The female holds 2–4 eggs between her pelvic fins, where the male fertilizes them for about 30 seconds. Only then does the female swim to a suitable spot, where she attaches the very sticky eggs. The pair repeats this process until about 100 eggs have been fertilized and attached.

== See also ==
- List of freshwater aquarium fish species
