= Ruy Lopez =

Chess opening

Position: a8 black rook, c8 black bishop, d8 black queen, e8 black king, f8 black bishop, g8 black knight, h8 black rook, a7 black pawn, b7 black pawn, c7 black pawn, d7 black pawn, f7 black pawn, g7 black pawn, h7 black pawn, c6 black knight, b5 white bishop, e5 black pawn, e4 white pawn, f3 white knight, a2 white pawn, b2 white pawn, c2 white pawn, d2 white pawn, f2 white pawn, g2 white pawn, h2 white pawn, a1 white rook, b1 white knight, c1 white bishop, d1 white queen, e1 white king, h1 white rook
- Moves: 1.e4 e5 2.Nf3 Nc6 3.Bb5
- ECO: C60–C99
- Origin: Göttingen manuscript, c. 1490
- Named after: Ruy López de Segura, Libro del Axedrez, 1561
- Parent: King's Knight Opening
- Synonyms: Spanish Opening; Spanish Game; Spanish Torture [colloq.]

The Ruy Lopez (/rɔɪ, ˈruːi/; Spanish: [ˈruj ˈlopeθ]), (Note: Latin American Spanish: [ˈlopes]) also called the Spanish Opening or Spanish Game, is a chess opening beginning with the moves:

1. e4 e5
2. Nf3 Nc6
3. Bb5

White develops the bishop to the active square b5 (the so-called "Spanish bishop"), attacking the knight that defends Black's e-pawn.

Recommended by the 16th century Spanish priest Ruy López de Segura, it is still regularly played in top-level competition. The theory of the Ruy Lopez is the most extensively developed of all Open Games; some lines have been analysed well beyond move thirty. At nearly every move there are many reasonable alternatives, and most have been deeply explored.

In the Encyclopaedia of Chess Openings (ECO), the opening is classified under codes C60 to C99.

== History ==
The Ruy Lopez is named after Ruy López de Segura, a 16th-century Spanish priest who systematically studied this and other openings in his 150-page chess book, Libro del Axedrez, written in 1561. Lopez advocated 3.Bb5 as superior to 3.Bc4, and was of the opinion that Black should play 2...d6 (the Philidor Defence) to avoid it. Although it bears his name, this particular opening was included in the Göttingen manuscript, which dates from c. 1490. The Ruy Lopez did not gain widespread popularity until the mid-19th century, when Finnish-Russian theoretician Carl Jaenisch published a detailed article on 1.e4 e5 in the December 1847 issue of Le Palamède, the world’s first chess periodical. An abridged version appeared in the Chess Player's Chronicle in 1848, followed by a supplementary article in the same publication in 1849.

The Ruy Lopez has long been regarded as the most important opening among the Open Games at master level. Nearly every player has employed it at some point in their career, often with both colours. Due to the difficulty for Black in achieving equality, a common nickname for the opening is "The Spanish Torture".

== Basics ==
Forking tactics for Black

Position: a8 black rook, c8 black bishop, e8 black king, f8 black bishop, g8 black knight, h8 black rook, b7 black pawn, c7 black pawn, f7 black pawn, g7 black pawn, h7 black pawn, a6 black pawn, c6 black pawn, e5 white knight, d4 black queen, e4 white pawn, a2 white pawn, b2 white pawn, c2 white pawn, d2 white pawn, f2 white pawn, g2 white pawn, h2 white pawn, a1 white rook, b1 white knight, c1 white bishop, d1 white queen, e1 white king, h1 white rook

(Exchange Variation) 3...a6 4.Bxc6 dxc6 5.Nxe5 Qd4

Position: a8 black rook, c8 black bishop, e8 black king, h8 black rook, a7 black pawn, b7 black pawn, c7 black pawn, f7 black pawn, g7 black pawn, h7 black pawn, c6 black pawn, f6 black knight, c5 black bishop, e5 white knight, d4 black queen, e4 white pawn, d3 white pawn, a2 white pawn, b2 white pawn, c2 white pawn, f2 white pawn, g2 white pawn, h2 white pawn, a1 white rook, b1 white knight, c1 white bishop, d1 white queen, e1 white king, h1 white rook

(Anti-Berlin) 3...Nf6 4.d3 Bc5 5.Bxc6 dxc6 6.Nxe5 Qd4

At the most basic level, White's third move attacks Black's knight, which defends the e-pawn from capture by White's knight on f3. White's apparent threat to win Black's e-pawn with 4.Bxc6 dxc6 5.Nxe5 is illusory because Black can respond 5...Qd4, forking the knight and e-pawn and regaining the material with a good position.

Even if White defends the e-pawn, Black may still have tactical opportunities. For example, in the Anti-Berlin (3...Nf6 4.d3), if Black plays 4...Bc5, 5.Bxc6 dxc6 6.Nxe5 does not win a pawn because of 6...Qd4, where the bishop on c5 supports the queen in threatening checkmate with 7...Qxf2, allowing Black to win the knight.

White must take some care not to fall into the Noah's Ark Trap, in which Black traps White's king's bishop with ...a6, ...b5, and ...c4 pawn advances on the queenside. This can occur in the 8.d4 Anti-Marshall, for example.

Despite the pitfalls, White's 3.Bb5 is still a good move. It develops a piece, prepares castling, and sets up a potential pin against Black's king. Unlike in the Italian Game (3.Bc4), the bishop is not threatened by a timely d7-d5 push from Black.

== Overview ==
Since White's third move carries no immediate threat, Black can respond in a wide variety of ways. An immediate choice for Black is whether to play 3...a6 or not. Black's common third-move alternatives include:

- 3...Nf6 (Berlin Defence)
- 3...f5 (Jaenisch Gambit)
- 3...Bc5 (Cordel Defence)
- 3...g6 (Fianchetto Defence)
- 3...Nge7 (Cozio Defence)
- 3...Nd4 (Bird's Defence)
- 3...d6 (Steinitz Defence)

By far the most common of these is the Berlin Defence, which has a reputation as a solid drawing weapon. It gained widespread popularity in the 2000s after Vladimir Kramnik demonstrated its viability in the 2000 Classical World Championship match against Garry Kasparov, successfully using it to draw in four of Kasparov's eight games with white.

=== Morphy Defence: 3...a6 ===
Position: a8 black rook, c8 black bishop, d8 black queen, e8 black king, f8 black bishop, g8 black knight, h8 black rook, b7 black pawn, c7 black pawn, d7 black pawn, f7 black pawn, g7 black pawn, h7 black pawn, a6 black pawn, c6 black knight, b5 white bishop, e5 black pawn, e4 white pawn, f3 white knight, a2 white pawn, b2 white pawn, c2 white pawn, d2 white pawn, f2 white pawn, g2 white pawn, h2 white pawn, a1 white rook, b1 white knight, c1 white bishop, d1 white queen, e1 white king, h1 white rook

Morphy Defence: 3...a6

The Morphy Defence (3...a6) is Black's most popular reply. Paul Morphy employed it in the second game (a draw) and fourth game (a win for Morphy) of his 1858 match against Adolf Anderssen in Paris. Earlier that year, Morphy had also encountered 3...a6 in one of his games against Johann Löwenthal in London. The move later gained widespread popularity and was subsequently named after him, although he was not its originator. Charles Henry Stanley played 3...a6 twice in his 1845 match, held in Morphy's hometown of New Orleans, against Eugène Rousseau for the United States Chess Championship. Stanley lost both games, although he won the match. Howard Staunton also mentioned 3...a6 in his Chess-Player's Handbook, first published in 1847. The first author to mention the move was Ercole del Rio, in his 1750 treatise Sopra il giuoco degli Scacchi, Osservazioni pratiche dell'anonimo Modenese (On the game of Chess, practical Observations by an anonymous Modenese). The late 19th century World Champion Wilhelm Steinitz did not approve of the move, writing in The Modern Chess Instructor (1889) that it drives the bishop to a better square. Steinitz's opinion did not prevail, however; 3...a6 is played in about two thirds of all games beginning with the Ruy Lopez.

The point of 3...a6 is to force White to either retreat or exchange the bishop for Black's knight. Thus, the move "puts the question" to the bishop, a traditional usage attributed to Aron Nimzowitsch. White must decide between exchanging the bishop for the knight with 4.Bxc6, the Exchange Variation, or the more common retreat 4.Ba4. If 4.Ba4, Black will have the possibility of breaking a future pin on the queen's knight by playing ...b5.

Position: a8 black rook, c8 black bishop, d8 black queen, e8 black king, f8 black bishop, h8 black rook, b7 black pawn, c7 black pawn, d7 black pawn, f7 black pawn, g7 black pawn, h7 black pawn, a6 black pawn, c6 black knight, f6 black knight, e5 black pawn, a4 white bishop, e4 white pawn, f3 white knight, a2 white pawn, b2 white pawn, c2 white pawn, d2 white pawn, f2 white pawn, g2 white pawn, h2 white pawn, a1 white rook, b1 white knight, c1 white bishop, d1 white queen, e1 white king, h1 white rook

Morphy Defence after 4.Ba4 Nf6

After 4.Ba4, Black's usual response is 4...Nf6, which was Morphy's choice in his games with 3...a6. Black's fourth-move alternatives include:

- 4...d6 (Modern Steinitz Defence)
- 4...Bc5 (Cordel Defence Deferred)
- 4...Nge7 (Cozio Defence Deferred)
- 4...g6 (Fianchetto Defence Deferred)
- 4...f5 (Jaenisch Gambit Deferred)
- 4...b5 5.Bb3 Na5 (Norwegian Defence)

After 4...Nf6, Black appears to threaten White's e-pawn. 5.0-0 is by far White's most common move, despite leaving the pawn undefended, as White can eventually regain it if Black plays 5...Nxe4. White's fifth-move alternatives include:

- 5.d3 (Anderssen Variation)
- 5.Bxc6 (Bayreuth Variation)
- 5.Qe2 (Wormald Variation)
- 5.Nc3 (Tarrasch Variation)
- 5.d4 (Mackenzie Variation)

After 5.0-0, Black faces a major choice. The most common continuation is the solid 5...Be7, the Closed Defence, while 5...Nxe4, the Open Defence, and 5...b5, the Arkhangelsk Defence, represent important alternative systems.

- 5...Be7 (Closed Defence)
- 5...Nxe4 (Open Defence)
- 5...b5 (Arkhangelsk Defence)
- 5...Bc5 (Møller Defence)
- 5...d6 (Russian Defence)

== Closed Defence: 5...Be7 ==
Position: a8 black rook, c8 black bishop, d8 black queen, e8 black king, h8 black rook, b7 black pawn, c7 black pawn, d7 black pawn, e7 black bishop, f7 black pawn, g7 black pawn, h7 black pawn, a6 black pawn, c6 black knight, f6 black knight, e5 black pawn, a4 white bishop, e4 white pawn, f3 white knight, a2 white pawn, b2 white pawn, c2 white pawn, d2 white pawn, f2 white pawn, g2 white pawn, h2 white pawn, a1 white rook, b1 white knight, c1 white bishop, d1 white queen, f1 white rook, g1 white king

3...a6 4.Ba4 Nf6 5.0-0 Be7

The Closed Defence, 3...a6 4.Ba4 Nf6 5.0-0 Be7, represents the most played system of the Ruy Lopez. Black genuinely threatens to win a pawn with 6...b5 followed by 7...Nxe4. White usually responds by defending the e-pawn with either 6.Re1 or 6.d3, after which 7.Bxc6 followed by 8.Nxe5 threatens to win a pawn. Following 6...b5 7.Bb3, Black usually plays either 7...d6 or 7...0-0.

7...d6 typically continues with 8.c3, addressing Black's threat of trading off White's bishop via 8...Na5. After 8...0-0, White usually plays 9.h3 in order to prevent the pin 9...Bg4. The position reached is the classical main line of the Ruy Lopez.

7...0-0 usually indicates that Black intends to meet 8.c3 with 8...d5, offering a pawn in exchange for active play against White’s king, a line known as the Marshall Attack. To avoid this highly theoretical gambit, White often chooses one of the eighth-move alternatives (8.a4, 8.h3, 8.d4, or 8.d3), collectively known as the Anti-Marshall Systems, which aim to discourage Black from executing the ...d5 break. When White chooses 8.c3, Black may also transpose to the classical main line with 8...d6, a practical option for players who might prefer facing an Anti-Marshall variation, but do not wish to play the Marshall Attack.

A variety of sidelines are possible, listed below. White's most common deviation from the classical main line starting with 6.Re1 b5 7.Bb3 d6 is 6.d3, the Martinez Variation, a modern line that has grown in popularity.

- 6.Re1
  - 6...b5 7.Bb3
    - 7...d6
      - 8.c3 0-0
        - 9.h3 (Classical main line)
        - 9.d4 (Yates Variation)
        - 9.d3 (Pilnik Variation)
      - 8.a4 (Anti-Classical system)
    - 7...0-0
      - 8.c3
        - 8...d5 (Marshall Attack)
        - 8...d6 9.h3 (Classical main line, by transposition)
      - without 8.c3 (Anti-Marshall Systems)
    - 7...Bb7 (Trajković Variation)
  - 6...d6 (Averbakh Variation)
- 6.d3 (Martinez Variation)
- 6.Bxc6 (Steenwijk Variation)
- 6.Qe2 (Worrall Attack)
- 6.Nc3 (Morphy Attack)
- 6.d4 (transposing to the Mackenzie Variation)

=== Classical main line: 6.Re1 b5 7.Bb3 d6 8.c3 0-0 9.h3 ===
Position: a8 black rook, c8 black bishop, d8 black queen, f8 black rook, g8 black king, c7 black pawn, e7 black bishop, f7 black pawn, g7 black pawn, h7 black pawn, a6 black pawn, c6 black knight, d6 black pawn, f6 black knight, b5 black pawn, e5 black pawn, e4 white pawn, b3 white bishop, c3 white pawn, f3 white knight, h3 white pawn, a2 white pawn, b2 white pawn, d2 white pawn, f2 white pawn, g2 white pawn, a1 white rook, b1 white knight, c1 white bishop, d1 white queen, e1 white rook, g1 white king

Classical main line: 6.Re1 b5 7.Bb3 d6 8.c3 0-0 9.h3

6.Re1 b5 7.Bb3 d6 8.c3 0-0 9.h3 is the traditional main line of the Closed Defence. It is often regarded as the main line of the Ruy Lopez as a whole, though 7...0-0 now rivals it in popularity. Thousands of top-level games have reached this position. With 8.c3, White prepares the central break d4 and plans the typical knight manoeuvre Nbd2–f1–g3, firmly reinforcing e4 while activating the bishops on open diagonals and directing both knights toward Black's kingside. Black, in turn, seeks to counter this plan by expanding on the queenside, challenging the centre, or increasing pressure on e4.

Black has several common moves, including 9...Na5 (Chigorin Variation), 9...Nb8 (Breyer Variation), 9...Bb7 (Zaitsev Variation), 9...Nd7 (Karpov Variation), 9...Be6 (Kholmov Variation), and 9...h6 (Smyslov Variation). For decades, the Chigorin Variation was Black's principal choice, but alternative lines rose to prominence in the second half of the twentieth century as players like Boris Spassky and Anatoly Karpov sought ways to avoid the necessity of repositioning Black's awkwardly placed knight.

==== Chigorin Variation: 9...Na5 ====
Position: a8 black rook, c8 black bishop, f8 black rook, g8 black king, c7 black queen, e7 black bishop, f7 black pawn, g7 black pawn, h7 black pawn, a6 black pawn, d6 black pawn, f6 black knight, a5 black knight, b5 black pawn, c5 black pawn, e5 black pawn, d4 white pawn, e4 white pawn, c3 white pawn, f3 white knight, h3 white pawn, a2 white pawn, b2 white pawn, c2 white bishop, f2 white pawn, g2 white pawn, a1 white rook, b1 white knight, c1 white bishop, d1 white queen, e1 white rook, g1 white king

Chigorin Variation: 9...Na5 10.Bc2 c5 11.d4 Qc7

The Chigorin Variation was refined by Mikhail Chigorin around the turn of the 20th century and became the primary Black defence to the Ruy Lopez for more than fifty years. With 9...Na5 Black chases the white bishop from the a2–g8 diagonal and frees the c-pawn for queenside expansion. After 10.Bc2 c5 11.d4, the classical follow-up is 11...Qc7, reinforcing e5 and placing the queen on the c-file, which may later become open after ...cxd4. Other Black moves in this position are 11...Bb7 and 11...Nd7; the latter was adopted by Paul Keres a few times in the 1960s. The Chigorin Variation has declined in popularity because Black must spend time bringing the offside knight on a5 back into the game. 10...d5 is the Gajewski Gambit, sacrificing the e-pawn for open lines. This is less sound than 10...c5, but can be good in practical play.

The Chigorin is divided into four ECO classifications. In C96, Black or White deviate after 10.Bc2, and do not reach the main line position 10...c5 11.d4 Qc7. In C97, White proceeds from the diagram with 12.a4, 12.d5, 12.b4, or the main line 12.Nbd2 when Black responds with ...Be6, ...Rd8, ...Re8, ...Bb7, or ...Bd7. The C98 classification covers 12.Nbd2 Nc6, while C99 covers 12.Nbd2 cxd4 13.cxd4.

==== Breyer Variation: 9...Nb8 ====
Position: a8 black rook, c8 black bishop, d8 black queen, f8 black rook, g8 black king, c7 black pawn, d7 black knight, e7 black bishop, f7 black pawn, g7 black pawn, h7 black pawn, a6 black pawn, d6 black pawn, f6 black knight, b5 black pawn, e5 black pawn, d4 white pawn, e4 white pawn, b3 white bishop, c3 white pawn, f3 white knight, h3 white pawn, a2 white pawn, b2 white pawn, f2 white pawn, g2 white pawn, a1 white rook, b1 white knight, c1 white bishop, d1 white queen, e1 white rook, g1 white king

Breyer Variation: 9...Nb8 10.d4 Nbd7

With 9...Nb8, Black frees the c-pawn and intends to route the knight to d7 where it supports e5. If White fortifies the centre with 10.d3, the opening is classified ECO code C94. The more common continuation, 10.d4, is ECO C95.

The Breyer Variation was recommended by Gyula Breyer as early as 1911, but there are no known game records in which Breyer employed this line. The Breyer Variation did not become popular until the 1960s when it was adopted by Boris Spassky and others. In particular, Spassky's back to back wins over Mikhail Tal at Tbilisi in 1965 did much to enhance its reputation, and Spassky had a career-plus score with the Breyer. The variation was the choice of many top level players as White has had trouble proving an advantage against it. Nowadays, however, this variation is considered too passive, and players seeking a draw with Black against 1.e4 often prefer to play the Berlin Defence (3...Nf6) or Petrov's Defence (2...Nf6) instead.

After 10.d4, the main line continues 10.d4 Nbd7 11.Nbd2 Bb7 12.Bc2 Re8 13.Nf1 Bf8. Black is threatening to win the e-pawn via ...exd4 uncovering an attack on the pawn, so White plays 14.Ng3. Black generally plays 14...g6 to stop White's knight from going to f5. White then usually tries to attack the Black queenside via 15.a4. Black seeks counterplay in the centre via 15...c5. White can attack either the kingside or the queenside. This forces resolution of the centre via 16.d5. Black can exploit the weak squares on the queenside via 16...c4. White will try to attack on the kingside via 17.Bg5, moving forces to the kingside. Black will kick the bishop with 17...h6. The logical retreat is 18.Be3, which is met by 18...Nc5. White plays 19.Qd2, forcing 19...h5, the point of the manoeuver being to weaken Black's kingside.

==== Zaitsev Variation: 9...Bb7 ====
Position: a8 black rook, d8 black queen, e8 black rook, f8 black bishop, g8 black king, b7 black bishop, c7 black pawn, f7 black pawn, g7 black pawn, h7 black pawn, a6 black pawn, c6 black knight, d6 black pawn, f6 black knight, b5 black pawn, e5 black pawn, d4 white pawn, e4 white pawn, b3 white bishop, c3 white pawn, f3 white knight, h3 white pawn, a2 white pawn, b2 white pawn, d2 white knight, f2 white pawn, g2 white pawn, a1 white rook, c1 white bishop, d1 white queen, e1 white rook, g1 white king

Zaitsev Variation, main line: 9...Bb7 10.d4 Re8 11.Nbd2 Bf8

The Zaitsev Variation (also called the Flohr–Zaitsev Variation) was advocated by Igor Zaitsev, who was one of Anatoly Karpov's trainers for many years. A Karpov favourite, the Zaitsev remains one of the most important variations of the Ruy Lopez. With 9...Bb7 Black prepares to put more pressure on e4 following 10.d4 Re8. One drawback of this line is that White can force a draw by repetition with 11.Ng5 Rf8 12.Nf3.

The main line continues with 11.Nbd2 Bf8. Here, White has 12.a4 and 12.a3 as the main moves, alongside 12.d5 and 12.Bc2. 12.Nf1? loses a pawn after 12...exd4 13.cxd4 Na5 14.Bc2 Nxe4, where White has insufficient compensation.

Along with the Breyer Variation, the Zaitsev Variation is one of the most common lines being played in the traditional main line of the Ruy Lopez. It has a high draw rate.

==== Karpov Variation: 9...Nd7 ====
Position: a8 black rook, c8 black bishop, d8 black queen, f8 black rook, g8 black king, c7 black pawn, d7 black knight, f7 black pawn, g7 black pawn, h7 black pawn, a6 black pawn, c6 black knight, d6 black pawn, f6 black bishop, b5 black pawn, e5 black pawn, d4 white pawn, e4 white pawn, b3 white bishop, c3 white pawn, f3 white knight, h3 white pawn, a2 white pawn, b2 white pawn, f2 white pawn, g2 white pawn, a1 white rook, b1 white knight, c1 white bishop, d1 white queen, e1 white rook, g1 white king

Karpov Variation: 9...Nd7 10.d4 Bf6

Karpov tried 9...Nd7 several times in the 1990 World Championship match, but Kasparov achieved a significant advantage against it in the 18th game. It is solid but slightly passive. Confusingly, 9...Nd7 is also called the Chigorin Variation, so there are two Ruy Lopez variations with that name, but 9...Na5 is the move more commonly associated with Chigorin. This defence is also known as the Keres Variation, after Paul Keres.

With 9...Nd7, Black frees up f6 for the bishop, aiming for a setup with ...Bf6, ...Nd7–Nb6, and ...Bb7. Play continues with 10.d4 Bf6 11.a4 Bb7. Now, White continues with 12.Na3; in the Karpov Ruy Lopez the knight usually goes to Na3 instead of Nbd2–f1–g3 to put more pressure on Black's queenside, and it can also be transferred to c2, preventing Black's knight from moving to b4 and where it can move to e3 or b4 if the situation calls for it. The main line continues 12...exd4 13.cxd4 Re8 14.axb5 axb5 15.Bf4 Na5 16.Bc2 b4 17.Nb5 Bc6 18.Qd3 b3 19.Bb1 Qb8 20.Nc3, where White has a space advantage.

White can opt for 12.d5 instead of 12.Na3 for closed positions, where play continues 12...Ne7 13.axb5 axb5 14.Rxa8 Qxa8 15.Na3 Ba6 16.Nc2 Nc5 17.Nb4 and either 18.Nb4 or 18.Bc2.

==== Kholmov Variation: 9...Be6 ====
The Kholmov Variation, 9...Be6, was popular in the 1980s but is now played less often at the master level. The main line runs 10.d4 Bxb3 11.axb3 (11.Qxb3 is another option) exd4 12.cxd4 d5 13.e5 Ne4 14.Nc3 f5 15.exf6 Bxf6 16.Nxe4 dxe4 17.Rxe4 Qd5 18.Rg4, when it has been shown that White's extra pawn is more valuable than Black's more active and harmonised pieces.

==== Smyslov Variation: 9...h6 ====
The Smyslov Variation (ECO C93) is a plan similar to that of the Zaitsev Variation. With 9...h6, Black prepares to play 10...Re8 and 11...Bf8 without fear of 10.Ng5. The loss of a tempo with 9...h6 gives White enough time to complete the Nbd2–f1–g3 manoeuver, and the pawn move can also weaken Black's kingside. The Zaitsev can be considered to be an improved Smyslov in which Black tries to save a tempo by omitting ...h6. Black sometimes plays ...h6 later in the Zaitsev, however.

Kasparov played the Smyslov Variation in a loss to the Deep Blue chess computer in Game 2 of their 1997 Man vs Machine match.

Svetozar Gligorić was one of the most prolific players of this line as black.

==== Other lines ====
- 9...Qd7 is another variation by Vasily Smyslov.
- 9...Re8 10.d4 transposes either into the Zaitsev Variation after 10...Bb7 or the Smyslov Variation after 10...h6.

=== White's deviations from the classical main line ===
==== Yates Variation: 9.d4 ====
Position: a8 black rook, d8 black queen, f8 black rook, g8 black king, c7 black pawn, e7 black bishop, f7 black pawn, g7 black pawn, h7 black pawn, a6 black pawn, c6 black knight, d6 black pawn, f6 black knight, b5 black pawn, e5 black pawn, d4 white pawn, e4 white pawn, g4 black bishop, b3 white bishop, c3 white pawn, f3 white knight, a2 white pawn, b2 white pawn, f2 white pawn, g2 white pawn, h2 white pawn, a1 white rook, b1 white knight, c1 white bishop, d1 white queen, e1 white rook, g1 white king

Bogoljubow Variation: 9.d4 Bg4

After 9.d4, the most common continuation is 9...Bg4 (the Bogoljubow Variation). The pin of White's knight on f3 is troublesome. The variation takes its name from the game Capablanca–Bogoljubow, London 1922.

After 9...Bg4, White usually plays 10.Be3, reinforcing the pawn on d4. The main line continues 10...exd4 11.cxd4 Na5 12.Bc2 c5 13.h3 (13.d5?! allows 13...Nc4 with a tempo on the e3-bishop) Bh5. The main alternative is 10.d5, with the most common continuation being 10...Na5 11.Bc2 c6 12.h3 Bc8 13.dxc6 Qc7 14.Nbd2 Qxc6 15.Nf1.

The Yates Variation is also frequently reached via the 8.d4 Anti-Marshall move order: 7...0-0 8.d4 d6 9.c3.

==== Pilnik Variation: 9.d3 ====
Position: a8 black rook, c8 black bishop, d8 black queen, f8 black rook, g8 black king, c7 black pawn, e7 black bishop, f7 black pawn, g7 black pawn, h7 black pawn, a6 black pawn, c6 black knight, d6 black pawn, f6 black knight, b5 black pawn, e5 black pawn, e4 white pawn, b3 white bishop, c3 white pawn, d3 white pawn, f3 white knight, a2 white pawn, b2 white pawn, f2 white pawn, g2 white pawn, h2 white pawn, a1 white rook, b1 white knight, c1 white bishop, d1 white queen, e1 white rook, g1 white king

Pilnik Variation: 9.d3

The Pilnik Variation, named for Hermann Pilnik, is also known as the Teichmann Variation from the game Teichmann–Schlechter, Karlsbad 1911. White plays 9.d3 intending to later advance to d4 under favourable circumstances. Although d2–d3–d4 appears to lose a tempo compared to d2–d4, White may be able to omit h3, regaining the tempo, especially if Black plays ...Bb7. The main line of the variation is 9...Na5 10.Bc2 c5 11.Nbd2.

The Pilnik has seen a small resurgence in recent years, but that is mainly by transposition through 6.d3 (or 8.d3), which avoids the Marshall Attack. The line starting with 6.d3 leading to the Pilnik is 6.d3 b5 7.Bb3 d6 8.c3 0-0 9.Re1. It is also possible to reach the Pilnik by transposition from the Italian Game (3.Bc4). After 3...Nf6 4.d3 Be7 5.0-0 0-0 6.Re1 d6, 7.c3 can be met with 7...Na5. To avoid losing the bishop pair, 8.Bb5 is played, after which 8...a6 9.Ba4 b5 10.Bc2 transposes to the Pilnik. The tempo lost by playing Bc4-b5 is regained by playing Ba4-c2 in one move.

==== White's ninth-move alternatives ====
- 9.a4, after 9...b4 10.a5, transposes to a line in the 8.a4 Anti-Marshall that goes 8.a4 b4 9.a5 d6 10.c3.
- 9.a3 is the Suetin Variation.
- 9.Bc2 is the Lutikov Variation.

==== Anti-Classical system: 8.a4 ====
8.a4 is an interesting alternative to 8.c3. It has been played by Fabiano Caruana, who described it as an "Anti-Classical setup" that aims to transpose to the 8.a4 Anti-Marshall if possible. Caruana refers to the move 7...d6 as the Classical Variation, a modern naming convention that has emerged due to the rise of 7...0-0.

=== Marshall Attack: 7...0-0 8.c3 d5 ===
Marshall Attack

Position: a8 black rook, c8 black bishop, d8 black queen, f8 black rook, g8 black king, c7 black pawn, e7 black bishop, f7 black pawn, g7 black pawn, h7 black pawn, a6 black pawn, c6 black knight, f6 black knight, b5 black pawn, d5 black pawn, e5 black pawn, e4 white pawn, b3 white bishop, c3 white pawn, f3 white knight, a2 white pawn, b2 white pawn, d2 white pawn, f2 white pawn, g2 white pawn, h2 white pawn, a1 white rook, b1 white knight, c1 white bishop, d1 white queen, e1 white rook, g1 white king

7...0-0 8.c3 d5

Position: a8 black rook, c8 black bishop, d8 black queen, f8 black rook, g8 black king, e7 black bishop, f7 black pawn, g7 black pawn, h7 black pawn, a6 black pawn, c6 black pawn, b5 black pawn, d5 black knight, e5 white rook, b3 white bishop, c3 white pawn, a2 white pawn, b2 white pawn, d2 white pawn, f2 white pawn, g2 white pawn, h2 white pawn, a1 white rook, b1 white knight, c1 white bishop, d1 white queen, g1 white king

Main line: 9.exd5 Nxd5 10.Nxe5 Nxe5 11.Rxe5 c6; in 1918 Marshall played 11...Nf6 instead.

One of Black's more aggressive alternatives, the Marshall Attack is a gambit as 8...d5 sacrifices a pawn. The gambit became famous when Frank James Marshall used it as a prepared variation against José Raúl Capablanca in 1918; nevertheless, Capablanca found a way through the complications and won. The Marshall has been adopted by top players including Boris Spassky, John Nunn, and Michael Adams. In the Classical World Chess Championship 2004, challenger Peter Leko used it to win an important game against World Champion Vladimir Kramnik. Currently, Armenian grandmaster Levon Aronian is one of the main advocates for the Marshall Attack.

The main line of the Marshall Attack begins with 9.exd5 Nxd5 10.Nxe5 Nxe5 11.Rxe5 c6 (Marshall's original moves, 11...Nf6, and 11...Bb7, are also playable). To the casual observer it might seem that Black has been careless and lost a pawn, but the sacrifice has also stripped off White's kingside defenders, given Black a lead in development, and rendered White's 8.c3 irrelevant. Black generally goes all-in with a massive kingside attack, which has been analysed to great depth (sometimes beyond move 30) with no definite conclusion as to the Marshall's soundness.

The Marshall is a sharp opening system in which a great amount of theoretical knowledge is vital, and many White players, including Garry Kasparov, avoid it by playing one of the Anti-Marshall systems. In these lines, attempting to play similarly to the Marshall with 8...d5 allows White's knight on b1 to eventually develop to c3, while it is blocked from doing so by White's own pawn in the Marshall. There are also several notable alternatives to the main line of the Marshall. For example, Black can play 9...e4 instead of 9...Nxd5, known as the Steiner Variation, named after the American chess player Herman Steiner. White can also play 9.d4 instead of 9.exd5.

Despite the Marshall's sharp, tactical nature, it has acquired a reputation as a drawing weapon, because extensive theoretical analysis has mapped out many forcing lines leading to balanced positions or perpetual check.

=== Anti-Marshall Systems: 7...0-0 without 8.c3 ===
==== 8.a4 ====
Position: a8 black rook, d8 black queen, f8 black rook, g8 black king, c7 black pawn, e7 black bishop, f7 black pawn, g7 black pawn, h7 black pawn, a6 black pawn, c6 black knight, d6 black pawn, e6 black bishop, f6 black knight, a5 white pawn, e5 black pawn, b4 black pawn, e4 white pawn, b3 white bishop, d3 white pawn, f3 white knight, b2 white pawn, c2 white pawn, f2 white pawn, g2 white pawn, h2 white pawn, a1 white rook, b1 white knight, c1 white bishop, d1 white queen, e1 white rook, g1 white king

8.a4 Anti-Marshall, main line: 8.a4 b4 9.d3 d6 10.a5 Be6

The 8.a4 Anti-Marshall is the most popular way for White to avoid the Marshall after 7...0-0. It has frequently been played by Garry Kasparov. White threatens 9.axb5 axb5 10.Rxa8, taking advantage of a pin. Black's main reply is 8...b4, where play can become quite sharp, but 8...Bb7 is a quieter alternative that encourages 9.d3, and 8...Rb8 is another possible sideline.

After 8...b4, White's traditional move is 9.d3, typically continuing 9...d6 10.a5 Be6. After this, 11.Nbd2 and 11.Bxe6 are the best moves for White. Common alternative lines include 9.d4 d6 10.dxe5, where Black offers a queen trade after 10...dxe5 or 10...Nxe5 11.Nxe5 dxe5, and 9.a5 d6 and then 10.c3 or 10.d3.

==== 8.h3 ====
Position: a8 black rook, d8 black queen, f8 black rook, g8 black king, b7 black bishop, c7 black pawn, d7 black pawn, e7 black bishop, f7 black pawn, g7 black pawn, h7 black pawn, a6 black pawn, c6 black knight, f6 black knight, b5 black pawn, e5 black pawn, e4 white pawn, b3 white bishop, d3 white pawn, f3 white knight, h3 white pawn, a2 white pawn, b2 white pawn, c2 white pawn, f2 white pawn, g2 white pawn, a1 white rook, b1 white knight, c1 white bishop, d1 white queen, e1 white rook, g1 white king

8.h3 Anti-Marshall, main line: 8.h3 Bb7 9.d3

The 8.h3 Anti-Marshall aims to transpose to the classical main line with 8...d6 9.c3. The typical central break 8...d5 is less effective: 9.exd5 Nxd5 10.Nxe5 Nxe5 11.Rxe5 c6 (or 11...Bb7 12.d3, which transposes to 8.h3 Bb7 9.d3 d5 10.exd5 Nxd5 11.Nxe5 Nxe5 12.Rxe5) 12.Re1!; the c3-square is available to the knight, giving White a significant advantage. However, instead of transposing with 8...d6, Black can play 8...Bb7, which is the main move. White usually replies with 9.d3. 9.c3 is inaccurate because after 9...d5 10.exd5 Nxd5, White cannot continue with the Marshall-like 11.Nxe5? Nxe5 12.Rxe5 due to the strong move 12...Nf4.

After 8.h3 Bb7 9.d3, Black can play the solid 9...d6, posing the positional threat of 10...Na5. White should respond with 10.a3 (the most common), 10.a4, or 10.c3, to create space for the light-squared bishop to retreat. An alternative is 9...d5 in typical Marshall Attack style. Following 10.exd5 Nxd5 11.Nxe5, Black targets White's light-squared bishop with 11...Nd4 (11...Nxe5 12.Rxe5 Qd6 is a viable alternative). With active piece play and a lead in development, Black gains sufficient compensation for White's extra pawn. This position was reached in game six of the 2016 World Championship match between Sergey Karjakin and Magnus Carlsen.

==== 8.d4 ====
8.d4 Anti-Marshall

Position: a8 black rook, c8 black bishop, d8 black queen, e8 black knight, f8 black rook, g8 black king, c7 black pawn, d7 black pawn, e7 black bishop, f7 black pawn, g7 black pawn, h7 black pawn, a6 black pawn, b5 black pawn, e5 white pawn, d4 black pawn, b3 white bishop, a2 white pawn, b2 white pawn, c2 white pawn, f2 white pawn, g2 white pawn, h2 white pawn, a1 white rook, b1 white knight, c1 white bishop, d1 white queen, e1 white rook, g1 white king

8.d4 Nxd4 9.Nxd4 exd4 10.e5 Ne8

Position: a8 black rook, c8 black bishop, d8 black queen, f8 black rook, g8 black king, c7 black pawn, d7 black pawn, e7 black bishop, g7 black pawn, h7 black pawn, a6 black pawn, f6 black knight, b5 black pawn, e5 white knight, d4 white queen, e4 white pawn, a2 white pawn, b2 white pawn, c2 white pawn, f2 white pawn, g2 white pawn, h2 white pawn, a1 white rook, b1 white knight, c1 white bishop, e1 white rook, g1 white king

8.d4 Nxd4 9.Bxf7+ Rxf7 10.Nxe5 Rf8 11.Qxd4

The 8.d4 Anti-Marshall immediately strikes at Black's centre. 8...exd4 is met with 9.e5, where Black's position is too passive. Therefore, Black either plays 8...d6, which after 9.c3 transposes to the Yates Variation, or 8...Nxd4, the main independent line. White can then play either 9.Nxd4 or 9.Bxf7+.

After 8.d4 Nxd4 9.Nxd4, play continues 9...exd4 10.e5 Ne8 with both 11.c3 and 11.Qxd4 as good options for White. 11.c3 can continue with 11...dxc3 12.Nxc3 and then 12...d6 or 12...Bb7, or Black can play 11...c5, with the common continuations 12.cxd4 c4 13.Bc2 d5 14.Nc3 Nc7, 12.cxd4 c4 13.Qf3 Rb8 14.Bc2 d5, or 12.Bd5.

An alternative to 9.Nxd4 is 9.Bxf7+, which has been advocated by Eric Rosen. Play can proceed with 9...Rxf7 10.Nxe5 Rf8 11.Qxd4 where White ends up with an extra pawn, but Black has better development and the bishop pair.

White must avoid 8...exd4 9.Nxd4 as this falls into the Noah's Ark Trap after 9...Nxd4 10.Qxd4 c5, and after White moves the queen, 11...c4, trapping White's bishop.

==== 8.d3 ====
The 8.d3 Anti-Marshall most often continues 8...d6 9.c3, transposing to the Pilnik Variation. 9.Bd2, 9.a4, 9.a3, and 8...Bb7 are also seen.

=== Black's other deviations from the main line ===
==== Trajković Variation: 7...Bb7 ====
Position: a8 black rook, d8 black queen, e8 black king, h8 black rook, b7 black bishop, c7 black pawn, e7 black bishop, f7 black pawn, g7 black pawn, h7 black pawn, a6 black pawn, b5 black pawn, e5 white rook, f4 black knight, b3 white bishop, c3 white pawn, a2 white pawn, b2 white pawn, d2 white pawn, f2 white pawn, g2 white pawn, h2 white pawn, a1 white rook, b1 white knight, c1 white bishop, d1 white queen, g1 white king

Trajković Variation: 6.Re1 b5 7.Bb3 Bb7 8.c3 d5 9.exd5 Nxd5 10.Nxe5 Nxe5 11.Rxe5 Nf4

After 6.Re1 b5 7.Bb3, an alternative to 7...0-0 and 7...d6 is 7...Bb7. This is known as the Trajković Variation. White's most frequent response is 8.c3. Also common are 8.d3, transposing to the Arkhangelsk Defence with 6...Bb7, and 8.d4, which has a similar idea to the 8.d4 Anti-Marshall.

After 8.c3, Black's main continuation is the pawn sacrifice 8...d5 in the style of the Marshall Attack: 8...d5 9.exd5 Nxd5 10.Nxe5 Nxe5 11.Rxe5. Black then has three principal options: 11...Nf4, when the main line continues 12.d4 Nxg2; 11...c5, usually followed by 12.d4 c4 13.Bc2 0-0; and 11...0-0, transposing into a line of the Marshall Attack. The more passive alternatives 8...0-0 and 8...d6 are also occasionally seen.

==== Averbakh Variation: 6...d6 ====
Position: a8 black rook, c8 black bishop, d8 black queen, e8 black king, h8 black rook, b7 black pawn, c7 black pawn, e7 black bishop, f7 black pawn, g7 black pawn, h7 black pawn, a6 black pawn, c6 black knight, d6 black pawn, f6 black knight, e5 black pawn, a4 white bishop, e4 white pawn, f3 white knight, a2 white pawn, b2 white pawn, c2 white pawn, d2 white pawn, f2 white pawn, g2 white pawn, h2 white pawn, a1 white rook, b1 white knight, c1 white bishop, d1 white queen, e1 white rook, g1 white king

Averbakh Variation: 6.Re1 d6

In the Averbakh Variation (ECO C87), named for Yuri Averbakh, Black defends the threatened e-pawn with 6...d6 instead of driving away the white bishop with the more common 6...b5. This defence shares some similarities with the Modern Steinitz Defence and Russian Defence as Black avoids the ...b5 advance that weakens the queenside. White can reply with either 7.Bxc6 bxc6 8.d4 or 7.c3 Bg4 (it is too late for Black to transpose into the more usual lines of the Closed Defence, because 7...b5 would allow 8.Bc2, saving White a tempo over the two-move sequence Bb3–c2 found in other variations). The pin temporarily prevents White from playing d2–d4. In response, White can either force d4 with 8.h3 Bh5 9.Bxc6 bxc6 10.d4, or postpone d4 for the time being and play 8.d3 followed by manoeuvering the queen knight to the kingside with Nbd2–f1–g3.

=== Modern line: 6.d3 ===
Position: a8 black rook, c8 black bishop, d8 black queen, e8 black king, h8 black rook, b7 black pawn, c7 black pawn, d7 black pawn, e7 black bishop, f7 black pawn, g7 black pawn, h7 black pawn, a6 black pawn, c6 black knight, f6 black knight, e5 black pawn, a4 white bishop, e4 white pawn, d3 white pawn, f3 white knight, a2 white pawn, b2 white pawn, c2 white pawn, f2 white pawn, g2 white pawn, h2 white pawn, a1 white rook, b1 white knight, c1 white bishop, d1 white queen, f1 white rook, g1 white king

Modern line: 6.d3

By playing 6.d3, often called the Martinez Variation, White steers clear of the Marshall Attack and any of the Anti-Marshall lines. 6.d3 has gained popularity among the top players and become a frequent alternative to the main line of the Closed Defence with 6.Re1. White threatens 7.Bxc6 to win the e-pawn, leaving Black a choice of either 6...d6 or 6...b5. White can choose between setups with c2-c3 and Nbd2 aiming for a d3-d4 push similar to the classical mainlines, or setups with Nc3 which aim for control over d5. The most common line is 6...b5 7.Bb3 d6, after which White must address the threat of 8...Na5, usually with 8.a3, 8.a4, or 8.c3. The variation can transpose into 6.Re1 lines with the advantage of avoiding the Marshall.

==== 8.a3 ====
Position: a8 black rook, c8 black bishop, d8 black queen, f8 black rook, g8 black king, c7 black pawn, e7 black bishop, f7 black pawn, g7 black pawn, h7 black pawn, a6 black pawn, c6 black knight, d6 black pawn, f6 black knight, b5 black pawn, e5 black pawn, e4 white pawn, a3 white pawn, b3 white bishop, c3 white knight, d3 white pawn, f3 white knight, b2 white pawn, c2 white pawn, f2 white pawn, g2 white pawn, h2 white pawn, a1 white rook, c1 white bishop, d1 white queen, f1 white rook, g1 white king

Modern line tabiya: 6.d3 b5 7.Bb3 d6 8.a3 0-0 9.Nc3

After 8.a3, 8...0-0 9.Nc3 arrives at a modern tabiya of the Ruy Lopez. This position was first reached in a high-level encounter between Viswanathan Anand and Michael Adams at the Grenke Chess Classic in 2013. Another frequently played line is 8...Na5 9.Ba2 c5 10.Nc3 Be6.

==== 8.a4 ====
8.a4 can transpose to the 8.a4 Anti-Marshall (6.Re1 b5 7.Bb3 0-0 8.a4). For example, one of the main lines of the 8.a4 Anti-Marshall is 8...Bb7 9.d3, which can also be reached by way of 6.d3 b5 7.Bb3 0-0 8.a4 Bb7 9.Re1. A perhaps more challenging response to the Anti-Marshall is 8...b4, after which White may wish to ambitiously play 9.a5 (preventing ...Na5) d6 10.d3 Be6!, where White cannot avoid the trade of bishops (the main moves being either 11.Bxe6 or 11.Nbd2 Bxb3). If Black elects not to exchange, however, we may see 11.Nbd2 Rb8 12.Nc4, where White may retain some pull in the position. On the other hand, the 6.d3 move order allows the line 6...b5 7.Bb3 d6 8.a4 b4 9.a5 0-0 10.Nbd2 Be6 11.Nc4!, where White has avoided the exchange and can transpose directly to the Anti-Marshall line if desired by playing Re1 later. Play may also in some rare cases transpose to a classical closed Spanish (with 7...d6) after something like 6.d3 d6 7.c3 0-0 8.Re1 b5 9.Bc2 Bb7 10.Nbd2 Re8 11.h3 Bf8 12.d4, reaching a reasonably well-trodden position in the Zaitsev system, though both players may deviate at many points in this line.

==== 8.c3 ====
8.c3 often transposes to the Pilnik Variation after 8...0-0 9.Re1 while avoiding the Marshall Attack. The resulting positions tend to resemble those from the Zaitsev, Flohr, Smyslov, Karpov, Breyer, and Chigorin, but with the distinction of White having played 10.d3 instead of 11.d4 (in the case of the Chigorin, 11.d3 instead of 11.d4, with 10.Bc2 c5 included), and can transpose if White plays Re1 and h3. In each, 10.d3 is far less popular than 10.d4 (again, 11.d4 for Chigorin), but is the only move besides d4 to ever be seriously considered. 10.d3 in those variations are often referred to as the 'quiet' variation of that variation (quiet Breyer, quiet Chigorin, etc). In the case of Flohr–Zaitsev-type setups, White may quickly push d3–d4 without h3. If h3 were later played, this would result in a lost tempo compared to the traditional Zaitsev, but h3 is not so relevant with Black's bishop already committed to b7, the main benefit being to provide luft.

==== Other lines ====
- 8.Bd2 is occasionally seen.
- 7...0-0 is a viable alternative to 7...d6. It can end up transposing, but gives White more options, such as 8.Nc3.
- After 6...d6, the pawn is firmly defended and Black threatens to trade off White's bishop with 7...b5 and 8...Na5. White normally continues with 7.c3, and after 8...0-0 White can choose between 9.Nbd2 or 9.Re1.

=== White's sixth-move alternatives ===
==== Steenwijk Variation: 6.Bxc6 ====
Position: a8 black rook, c8 black bishop, d8 black queen, e8 black king, h8 black rook, b7 black pawn, c7 black pawn, e7 black bishop, f7 black pawn, g7 black pawn, h7 black pawn, a6 black pawn, c6 black pawn, f6 black knight, e5 black pawn, e4 white pawn, f3 white knight, a2 white pawn, b2 white pawn, c2 white pawn, d2 white pawn, f2 white pawn, g2 white pawn, h2 white pawn, a1 white rook, b1 white knight, c1 white bishop, d1 white queen, f1 white rook, g1 white king

Steenwijk Variation: 6.Bxc6 dxc6

The Steenwijk Variation (ECO C85), also known as the Delayed Exchange Variation Deferred or Exchange Variation Doubly Deferred, begins with 6.Bxc6. At first glance this seems a waste of time, as it loses a tempo compared to the standard Exchange Variation (4.Bxc6), though in compensation, the black knight on f6 and bishop on e7 are awkwardly placed. The knight on f6 prevents Black from supporting the e-pawn with ...f7–f6, and the bishop is somewhat passively posted on e7, and ...Bd6, a common posting for the bishop in the Exchange Variation, would be a loss of tempo.

After the usual 6...dxc6, 7.Nxe5 can be met with 7...Nxe4. Instead, the main idea of the variation is 7.d3. If 7...Bg4, 8.h3 forces Black to give up the bishop pair, as 8...Bh5 9.g4 gives up a pawn. 7...Qd6 can be met with 8.Nbd2, with the idea of 9.Nc4. Black's usual reply is instead the backwards knight move 7...Nd7. The main line continues 8.Nbd2 0-0 9.Nc4 f6 10.Nh4 Nc5.

==== Worrall Attack: 6.Qe2 ====
Position: a8 black rook, c8 black bishop, d8 black queen, e8 black king, h8 black rook, b7 black pawn, c7 black pawn, d7 black pawn, e7 black bishop, f7 black pawn, g7 black pawn, h7 black pawn, a6 black pawn, c6 black knight, f6 black knight, e5 black pawn, a4 white bishop, e4 white pawn, f3 white knight, a2 white pawn, b2 white pawn, c2 white pawn, d2 white pawn, e2 white queen, f2 white pawn, g2 white pawn, h2 white pawn, a1 white rook, b1 white knight, c1 white bishop, f1 white rook, g1 white king

Worrall Attack: 6.Qe2

In the Worrall Attack (ECO C86), White replaces 6.Re1 with 6.Qe2. The idea is that the queen will support the e-pawn, leaving the rook free to move to d1 to support the advance of the d-pawn, although there is not always time for this. Play normally continues 6...b5 7.Bb3 followed by 7...0-0 8.c3 and 8...d5 or 8...d6.

Paul Keres played the line several times. More recently, Sergei Tiviakov has played it, as has Nigel Short, who essayed it twice in his 1992 match against Anatoly Karpov and won both games.

==== Morphy Attack: 6.Nc3 ====
Position: a8 black rook, c8 black bishop, d8 black queen, e8 black king, h8 black rook, b7 black pawn, c7 black pawn, d7 black pawn, e7 black bishop, f7 black pawn, g7 black pawn, h7 black pawn, a6 black pawn, c6 black knight, f6 black knight, e5 black pawn, a4 white bishop, e4 white pawn, c3 white knight, f3 white knight, a2 white pawn, b2 white pawn, c2 white pawn, d2 white pawn, f2 white pawn, g2 white pawn, h2 white pawn, a1 white rook, c1 white bishop, d1 white queen, f1 white rook, g1 white king

Morphy Attack: 6.Nc3

The Morphy Attack (ECO C84) is named after Paul Morphy, who introduced the idea in a 1859 blindfold simul. It is aggressive and may lead to a slight edge for White, but less than in 6.Re1 and 6.d3. Similarly to those two moves, White's defence of the e-pawn compels Black to drive away White's bishop with 6...b5 (6...d6 is also possible, but less popular). After 7.Bb3, Black can play 7...0-0 or 7...d6.

The main line after 7...d6 is 8.Nd5 Na5 9.Nxe7 Qxe7 10.d3 0-0, with Black eventually taking the bishop pair from White after ...Nxb3, shows a common attacking idea in the Morphy Attack; Nd5. In the main line, 8...Nxd5? is wrong because 9.Bxd5! leaves White with a strong bishop on the outpost square d5, exerting a troublesome pin on Black's undefended knight on c6.

After 7...0-0, White's main move is 8.d3, which transposes to one of the main lines of 6.d3, with 6...b5 7.Bb3 0-0 8.Nc3. Marshall Attack-style ideas of playing ...d5 next, sacrificing a pawn, make little sense when White's knight on c3 both controls d5 and means White has a more developed queenside, one of the upsides of the Marshall usually being White's underdeveloped queenside.

Paul Keres and Boris Spassky have both played this line a few times throughout their careers (both playing it against one another once), and Siegbert Tarrasch played it three times in his 1911 match against Schlechter (scoring 1 win, 1 draw, 1 loss in that order), but it remains the least popular option for White on move 6.

== Open Defence: 5...Nxe4 ==
Position: a8 black rook, d8 black queen, e8 black king, f8 black bishop, h8 black rook, c7 black pawn, f7 black pawn, g7 black pawn, h7 black pawn, a6 black pawn, c6 black knight, e6 black bishop, b5 black pawn, d5 black pawn, e5 white pawn, e4 black knight, b3 white bishop, f3 white knight, a2 white pawn, b2 white pawn, c2 white pawn, f2 white pawn, g2 white pawn, h2 white pawn, a1 white rook, b1 white knight, c1 white bishop, d1 white queen, f1 white rook, g1 white king

Open Defence, main line: 6.d4 b5 7.Bb3 d5 8.dxe5 Be6

In the Open Defence (ECO C80-C83), Black tries to make use of the time White will take to regain the pawn to establish a foothold in the centre. Play usually continues 6.d4 b5 7.Bb3 d5 8.dxe5 Be6. The move 8.dxe5 leads to White attacking Black's pawn on d5 with two pieces, all but forcing Black's response 8...Be6, the only way to both defend the pawn and develop a new piece. White then has a variety of options at move nine, including 9.c3, 9.Be3, 9.Qe2, and 9.Nbd2.

=== Classical Variation: 6.d4 b5 7.Bb3 d5 8.dxe5 Be6 9.c3 ===
After 9.c3, Black has a choice between the traditional 9...Be7 and the more aggressive 9...Bc5, where White's most common move is 10.Nbd2, almost always continuing 10...0-0 11.Bc2. Black must meet the attack on e4. 11...f5 and 11...Bf5 aim to maintain the strongpoint on e4, or Black can play the forcing line 11...Nxf2, introduced by the English amateur Vernon Dilworth.

==== Dilworth Variation: 9...Bc5 10.Nbd2 0-0 11.Bc2 Nxf2 ====
Position: a8 black rook, d8 black queen, f8 black rook, g8 black king, c7 black pawn, f7 black pawn, g7 black pawn, h7 black pawn, a6 black pawn, c6 black knight, e6 black bishop, b5 black pawn, c5 black bishop, d5 black pawn, e5 white pawn, c3 white pawn, f3 white knight, a2 white pawn, b2 white pawn, c2 white bishop, d2 white knight, f2 black knight, g2 white pawn, h2 white pawn, a1 white rook, c1 white bishop, d1 white queen, f1 white rook, g1 white king

Dilworth Variation: 9.c3 Bc5 10.Nbd2 0-0 11.Bc2 Nxf2

After this move, the continuation 12.Rxf2 f6 13.exf6 Bxf2+ 14.Kxf2 Qxf6 has scored well for Black, with many traps for the ill-prepared White player. The main line leads to unbalanced endgames which are difficult to play for both sides, though with a strong drawing tendency. Artur Yusupov is one of the few grandmasters who has adopted the Dilworth repeatedly. White has the alternative move of 13.Nf1, which continues 13...Bxf2+ 14.Kxf2 fxe5 15.Kg1.

The variation can also be reached via 11...Bxf2, with the line 12.Rxf2 Nxf2 13.Kxf2 f6 14.exf6 Qxf6 reaching the same position as the main line, though White can instead play 14.Nf1 or 14.Kg1 to transpose to the 13.Nf1 line.

==== 11...f5 ====
11...f5 is an older continuation. After 12.Nb3 Bb6 13.Nfd4 Nxd4 14.Nxd4 Bxd4, White can gain some advantage with Bogoljubov's 15.Qxd4. Instead, the sharp La Grande Variation continues 15.cxd4 f4 16.f3 Ng3 17.hxg3 fxg3 18.Qd3 Bf5 19.Qxf5 Rxf5 20.Bxf5 Qh4 21.Bh3 Qxd4+ 22.Kh1 Qxe5, with unclear consequences. Perhaps the most famous game in this variation is Smyslov–Reshevsky, 1945 USSR–USA Radio Match. An analysis of the line had just been published in a Russian chess magazine, and Smyslov was able to follow it to quickly obtain a winning position. Reshevsky had not seen the analysis and he struggled in vain to solve the position over the board with his chess clock running.

==== 11...Bf5 ====
11...Bf5 most often continues 12.Nb3 Bg6 13.Nfd4 Bxd4 14.cxd4 a5 15.Be3 a4, followed by 16.Nd2 a3 17.Nxe4 axb2 18.Rb1 Bxe4 19.Rxb2 Qd7 20.Bd3 Bxd3 21.Qxd3, or alternatively 15.Nd2 f6 or 15.Nc1 a3.

==== 9...Be7 ====
After 9...Be7, White most often continues 10.Nbd2, but 10.Be3, 10.Bc2, 10.Re1, and other moves are also seen. If White plays 10.Nbd2, Black usually plays 10...0-0, with the common continuation 11.Bc2 f5 12.Nb3 Qd7, or 10...Nc5, which usually transposes to the Bernstein Variation after 11.Bc2. Once common, 10.Re1 is a rare move today. After the usual 10...0-0, White can play 11.Nd4 (11.Nbd2 is an alternative), setting up the Tarrasch Trap, which occurs if Black plays 11...Qd7??. Instead, 11...Nxe5 is best.

=== Bernstein Variation: 9.Nbd2 ===
Position: a8 black rook, d8 black queen, e8 black king, f8 black bishop, h8 black rook, c7 black pawn, f7 black pawn, g7 black pawn, h7 black pawn, a6 black pawn, c6 black knight, e6 black bishop, b5 black pawn, c5 black knight, d5 black pawn, e5 white pawn, b3 white bishop, c3 white pawn, f3 white knight, a2 white pawn, b2 white pawn, d2 white knight, f2 white pawn, g2 white pawn, h2 white pawn, a1 white rook, c1 white bishop, d1 white queen, f1 white rook, g1 white king

Bernstein Variation, main line: 9.Nbd2 Nc5 10.c3

This move aims to limit Black's options, and is the preferred move of Anatoly Karpov. Black's usual next move is 9...Nc5, with White almost always responding with 10.c3. Black can then respond with 10...Be7, a line also often reached from the Classical Variation after 9.c3 Be7 10.Nc5 Be7, or 10...d4. Black can also opt to play 9...Be7 and then 10...0-0 (or transpose with 10...Nc5).

In the 1978 Karpov–Korchnoi World Chess Championship match, following 9.Nbd2 Nc5 10.c3 d4, Karpov introduced the surprising 11.Ng5!?, a move suggested by his trainer, Igor Zaitsev. If Black takes the knight with 11...Qxg5, White regains the material with 12.Qf3. This variation played a decisive role in a later World Championship match, Kasparov–Anand 1995, when Anand was unable to successfully defend as Black.

=== Howell Attack: 9.Qe2 ===
In the Howell Attack (ECO C81), White aims for play against d5 after Rd1. The game usually continues 9...Be7 10.Rd1 followed by 10...Nc5 or 10...0-0. Paul Keres played this line against Max Euwe and Samuel Reshevsky at the World Chess Championship tournament 1948. This has been played at the top by World No.2 Fabiano Caruana among others, and he recommends this in his video series for Chessbase.

=== Riga Variation: 6...exd4 ===
Position: a8 black rook, c8 black bishop, d8 black queen, e8 black king, h8 black rook, b7 black pawn, c7 black pawn, f7 black pawn, g7 black pawn, h7 black pawn, a6 black pawn, c6 white knight, d5 black pawn, a4 white bishop, e4 black knight, a2 white pawn, b2 white pawn, c2 white pawn, f2 white pawn, g2 white pawn, h2 black bishop, a1 white rook, b1 white knight, c1 white bishop, d1 white queen, e1 white rook, g1 white king

Riga Variation: 6.d4 exd4 7.Re1 d5 8.Nxd4 Bd6 9.Nxc6 Bxh2+; Black can force a draw after 10.Kxh2?, better is 10.Kh1

This variation is considered inferior. The main line runs 7.Re1 d5 8.Nxd4 Bd6! 9.Nxc6 Bxh2+! 10.Kh1! Qh4 11.Rxe4+! dxe4 12.Qd8+! Qxd8 13.Nxd8+ Kxd8 14.Kxh2 Be6 (14...f5?? 15.Bg5#) and now the endgame is considered to favour White after 15.Be3 or Nd2 (but not 15.Nc3 c5!, playing to trap the bishop). A famous example of this line is the game José Raúl Capablanca–Edward Lasker, New York 1915. White is objectively better here, but Black keeps some good practical chances owing to the sharp positions that occur.

White must be careful to play 10.Kh1 in the main line instead of the intuitive 10.Kxh2, because after 10.Kxh2 Qh4+ 11.Kg1 Qxf2+, Black can force a draw by perpetual check.

White also has the notable eighth-move alternatives of 8.Bg5, the Berger Variation, and 8.c4.

=== Other lines ===
- In the main line 6.d4 b5 7.Bb3 d5 8.dxe5 Be6, 9.Be3 is often used to transpose into the main line with 9.c3 Be7, while removing the option of 9.c3 Bc5.
- After 6.d4 b5 7.Bb3, 7...exd4 is weak due to 8.Re1 d5 9.Nc3!, seen in Bobby Fischer–Petar Trifunović, Bled 1961.
- 6.d4 b5 7.Bb3 d5 8.Nxe5, once adopted by Fischer, is also playable. Black should equalise after the accurate 8...Nxe5 9.dxe5 c6, which avoids prematurely committing the light-squared bishop and solidly defends d5, often a problem in the Open.
- 6.d4 b5 7.Nxe5 is the rarely seen Friess Attack. It usually continues 7...Nxe5 8.dxe5, and from there either 8...Nc5 9.Bb3 Nxb3 10.axb3 Bb7 or 8...d5 9.Bb3, transposing to Fischer's line above. 7...bxa4 is also possible, with White planning Qe2 and Nxc6.
- 6.d4 b5 7.d5 is the Richter Variation. It most often continues 7...bxa4 (or 7...Ne7 8.Re1) 8.dxc6 d6 9.c4 Be7. White can regain the pawn with 10.Qxa4, but the line is not well regarded.
- 6.d4 Be7 most often continues 7.Re1 b5 8.Rxe4 d5 9.Nxe5 Nxe5 10.Rxe5 bxa4. Black can be forced to delay castling after 11.Qe2 due to the pressure on Black's bishop on e7, with the usual responses 11...Be6, 11...c6, and 11...f6. The line can also be reached via 6.d4 b5 7.Bb3 Be7. Black cannot play 9...dxe4 due to 10.Nxc6, forcing Black to move the queen, followed by 11.Nxe7.
- 6.Re1 is White's main sixth-move alternative. It most often continues 6...Nc5 7.Bxc6 dxc6 8.Nxe5 Be7 9.d4 Ne6 10.Be3 0-0, and from there often 11.c4 f6 12.Nf3; 8.d4 Ne6 9.Nxe5 Be7 transposes to the same line.

== Arkhangelsk Defence: 5...b5 ==
Position: a8 black rook, c8 black bishop, d8 black queen, e8 black king, f8 black bishop, h8 black rook, c7 black pawn, d7 black pawn, f7 black pawn, g7 black pawn, h7 black pawn, a6 black pawn, c6 black knight, f6 black knight, b5 black pawn, e5 black pawn, e4 white pawn, b3 white bishop, f3 white knight, a2 white pawn, b2 white pawn, c2 white pawn, d2 white pawn, f2 white pawn, g2 white pawn, h2 white pawn, a1 white rook, b1 white knight, c1 white bishop, d1 white queen, f1 white rook, g1 white king

Arkhangelsk Defence: 5...b5 6.Bb3

The Arkhangelsk Defence (or Archangel Defence) (ECO C78) was popularized by Soviet players from the city of Arkhangelsk such as GM Vladimir Malaniuk. After 5...b5 6.Bb3, Black usually continues with 6...Bb7 or 6...Bc5.

=== Traditional line: 6...Bb7 ===
This line often leads to sharp positions in which Black wagers that the fianchettoed bishop's influence on the centre and kingside will offset Black's delay in castling. It is tactically justified by Black's ability to meet 7.Ng5 with 7...d5 8.exd5 Nd4! (not 8...Nxd5, when White gets the advantage with 9.Qh5 g6 10.Qf3). White has several options, including attempting to build an ideal pawn centre with the immediate 7.c3 and 8.d4, defending the e-pawn with 7.Re1, or simply developing with 7.d3.

=== Modern Arkhangelsk Defence: 6...Bc5 ===
Position: a8 black rook, c8 black bishop, d8 black queen, e8 black king, h8 black rook, c7 black pawn, d7 black pawn, f7 black pawn, g7 black pawn, h7 black pawn, a6 black pawn, c6 black knight, f6 black knight, b5 black pawn, c5 black bishop, e5 black pawn, e4 white pawn, b3 white bishop, f3 white knight, a2 white pawn, b2 white pawn, c2 white pawn, d2 white pawn, f2 white pawn, g2 white pawn, h2 white pawn, a1 white rook, b1 white knight, c1 white bishop, d1 white queen, f1 white rook, g1 white king

Modern Arkhangelsk Defence: 6...Bc5

The Modern Arkhangelsk Defence (or Modern Archangel Defence), sometimes called the Neo-Arkhangelsk or Neo-Archangel, is a refinement of the regular Arkhangelsk Defence by incorporating ideas similar to the Møller Defence (5...Bc5). The traditional line continues 7.c3 d6 8.d4 (8.a4 Rb8 transposes to the modern main line 7.a4) 8...Bb6 and Black's position is fine. A key justification of the line is that after 9.dxe5 Nxe5 10.Nxe5 dxe5 11.Qxd8+ Kxd8 12.Bxf7 White appears to win a pawn, but after 12...Rf8 13.Bd5 Nxd5 14.exd5 Bb7 Black recovers the pawn with an equal position (if 13.Bb3 Nxe4 14.Bd5? attempting to fork the two pieces, 14...Nxf2! wins for Black with a devastating attack).

The Modern Arkhangelsk started to gain popularity in the 1990s (due significantly to the efforts of Alexei Shirov) when the main continuation 7.a4 Rb8 8.c3 d6 9.d4 Bb6 was established (7...Bb7 is also possible, leading to positions similar to the traditional Arkhangelsk). A typical idea is to play ...Bg4 to increase the pressure against White's pawn centre. Critical modern tries for White include targeting the b5 pawn with 10.Na3, leading to sharp positions where Black often sacrifices that pawn, or 10.a5, gaining space on the queenside and where the pawn is known to be tactically immune from capture. Fabiano Caruana is one of the most notable recent exponents of this variation, employing it in the Candidates Tournament 2020.

=== Other lines ===
- 6...Be7 usually continues with 7.Re1, transposing to the main line of the Closed Defence. White can also opt to play 7.d4, usually continuing 7...d6 and then 8.c3 0-0 (or 8...Bg4), with transposition to the main line possible if White later plays Re1, or 8.dxe5, which usually leads to an endgame after 8...dxe5 9.Qxd8+ Kxd8 or 8...Nxe5 9.Nxe5 dxe5 10.Qxd8+ Kxd8. 7.d3 and 7.a4 are also possible alternatives for White.
- 6...d6 usually continues with 7.Re1 or 7.c3, both most often transposing to the main line after 7...Be7, though in the latter case White can avoid the transposition by not playing Re1. 7.a4 and 7.Ng5 are also possible.
- 6...Nxe4 usually transposes to the Open Defence after 7.d4, but an independent line with 7.Re1 is also possible. Its usual continuations are 7...d5 8.Nc3 Nxc3 9.dxc3 Be6 10.a4 and 7...Nc5 8.Bd5.

== Black's fifth-move alternatives ==
=== Russian Defence: 5...d6 ===
Position: a8 black rook, c8 black bishop, d8 black queen, e8 black king, f8 black bishop, h8 black rook, b7 black pawn, c7 black pawn, f7 black pawn, g7 black pawn, h7 black pawn, a6 black pawn, c6 black knight, d6 black pawn, f6 black knight, e5 black pawn, a4 white bishop, e4 white pawn, f3 white knight, a2 white pawn, b2 white pawn, c2 white pawn, d2 white pawn, f2 white pawn, g2 white pawn, h2 white pawn, a1 white rook, b1 white knight, c1 white bishop, d1 white queen, f1 white rook, g1 white king

Russian Defence: 5...d6

The Russian Defence (ECO C79) is also called the Steinitz Defence Deferred. With the move order 3...a6 4.Ba4 Nf6 5.0-0 d6, Black waits until White castles before playing ...d6. This can enable Black to avoid some lines in the Modern Steinitz Defence (4...d6) in which White castles queenside, although the position of the knight on f6 also precludes Black from supporting the centre with ...f7–f6.

Mikhail Chigorin played the Russian Defence in the 1890s, and later it was adopted by Akiba Rubinstein and Alekhine. The last significant use of the Russian Defence was in the 1950s, when it was played by some Russian masters. Today, however, it has purely practical value, as White has found numerous ways to gain an opening advantage by quickly opening lines in the centre, where Black's developmental lag seems to be a significant factor.

=== Møller Defence: 5...Bc5 ===
Position: a8 black rook, c8 black bishop, d8 black queen, e8 black king, h8 black rook, b7 black pawn, c7 black pawn, d7 black pawn, f7 black pawn, g7 black pawn, h7 black pawn, a6 black pawn, c6 black knight, f6 black knight, c5 black bishop, e5 black pawn, a4 white bishop, e4 white pawn, f3 white knight, a2 white pawn, b2 white pawn, c2 white pawn, d2 white pawn, f2 white pawn, g2 white pawn, h2 white pawn, a1 white rook, b1 white knight, c1 white bishop, d1 white queen, f1 white rook, g1 white king

Møller Defence: 5...Bc5

5...Bc5 is the Møller Defence. The usual continuation is 6.c3 b5, after which White can either play 7.Bb3, transposing to the Modern Arkhangelsk Variation, or 7.Bc2. 6...0-0 is also seen, usually continuing 7.d4 Ba7. White also has the options of 7.d3, 7.Bxc6, and 7.Nxe5, aiming to fork Black's knight and bishop after 7...Nxe5 8.d4.

The Møller Defence is named after Jørgen Møller (1873–1944), who analysed it in Tidskrift för Schack. Alexander Alekhine played it with Black in the early portion of his career; despite his advocacy, it never achieved great popularity, and even he eventually came to consider it dubious.

== White's fifth-move alternatives ==
These fifth move sidelines are classified under ECO C77.

=== Anderssen Variation: 5.d3 ===
Position: a8 black rook, c8 black bishop, d8 black queen, e8 black king, f8 black bishop, h8 black rook, b7 black pawn, c7 black pawn, d7 black pawn, f7 black pawn, g7 black pawn, h7 black pawn, a6 black pawn, c6 black knight, f6 black knight, e5 black pawn, a4 white bishop, e4 white pawn, d3 white pawn, f3 white knight, a2 white pawn, b2 white pawn, c2 white pawn, f2 white pawn, g2 white pawn, h2 white pawn, a1 white rook, b1 white knight, c1 white bishop, d1 white queen, e1 white king, h1 white rook

Anderssen Variation: 5.d3

5.d3 is the most popular alternative to 5.0-0. It defends White's e-pawn and indirectly threatens Black's e-pawn with Bxc6 followed by Nxe5, since ...Qd4 no longer targets an undefended pawn. Black can meet this idea with 5...b5, 5...d6, or 5...Bc5, intending to answer Bxc6 and Nxe5 with ...Qd4, attacking the knight on e5 while simultaneously creating a queen–bishop battery against f2.

After 5...b5 6.Bb3, Black usually plays 6...Bc5, developing the bishop to a much more active square compared to 6...Be7, which, after 7.0-0, would transpose to the Martinez Variation.

With 5...d6, Black intends to trade White's bishop following 6...b5 7.Bb3 Na5. White can choose to meet this idea with 6.c3, which, after 6...Be7, transposes into the Martinez Variation, or play 6.c4 (Duras Variation), aiming to stop b7–b5 and develop actively with h3, 0-0, Nc3.

Against 5...Bc5, play typically continues 6.c3 b5 7.Bb3 d6 8.0-0 0-0. At this point, White often adopts the more thematic plans 9.Nbd2 or 9.h3; however, the strongest continuation is 9.Bg5. After 9...h6 10.Bh4 g5 White must choose between the safer 11.Bg3 or the sharper 11.Nxg5.

If White wants to play a Ruy Lopez with d2–d3, it is objectively slightly better to first play 5.0-0, wait for Black to play 5...Be7, then play the Martinez (6.d3). This is because in the Anderssen, it is not clear if White has an advantage after 5...Bc5. On the other hand, 5.d3 avoids the Open Defence.

=== Mackenzie Variation: 5.d4 ===
Position: a8 black rook, c8 black bishop, d8 black queen, e8 black king, f8 black bishop, h8 black rook, b7 black pawn, c7 black pawn, d7 black pawn, f7 black pawn, g7 black pawn, h7 black pawn, a6 black pawn, c6 black knight, f6 black knight, e5 black pawn, a4 white bishop, d4 white pawn, e4 white pawn, f3 white knight, a2 white pawn, b2 white pawn, c2 white pawn, f2 white pawn, g2 white pawn, h2 white pawn, a1 white rook, b1 white knight, c1 white bishop, d1 white queen, e1 white king, h1 white rook

Mackenzie Variation: 5.d4

5.d4 has been called the Mackenzie Variation, after George Henry Mackenzie, who employed it on a regular basis. It has also been called the Centre Attack. It is an old line which, according to modern theory, does not promise White any advantage, though it is still occasionally used and leads to sharp play. The main continuation is 5...exd4 6.0-0 Be7, a position also frequently reached from the Closed Defence after 5.0-0 Be7 6.d4 exd4.

A frequently played line is 7.Re1 b5 8.Bb3 d6 9.Bd5 Nxd5 10.exd5 Ne5 11.Nxd4 0-0. 7...0-0 is also playable for Black; White's response 8.e5 kicks Black's knight, which must relocate with 8...Ne8 or 8...Nd5.

7.Re1 b5 8.e5 is a sharp line typically met with 8...Nxe5. White can respond with 9.Rxe5, where two common lines are 9...d6 10.Re1 bxa4 11.Nxd4 Bd7 12.Qf3 0-0 13.Nc6 Bxc6 14.Qxc6, where White can later play Qxa4 to equalize material, and 9...bxa4 10.Nxd4 0-0 11.Nf5 Re8 12.Bg5 d6 13.Nxe7+ Rxe7 14.Bxf6 gxf6, which leaves Black up a pawn but with an exposed king. A common alternative to 9.Rxe5 is 9.Nxe5, which most often continues 9...bxa4 10.Qxd4 0-0 11.Qxa4 Rb8 (or 11.Nc3 or 11.Bg5).

In case of the immediate 7.e5, Black can take advantage of the absence of White's rook from e1 by playing 7...Ne4, a position also reachable via 6.e5 Ne4 7.0-0 Be7. The line is considered harmless because the usual 8.Nxd4 can be met with 8...0-0, where the aggressive 9.Nf5 can be countered with 9...d5; the knight will be exchanged after 10.Nxe7+ Qxe7, 10.Bxc6 bxc6 11.Nxe7+ Qxe7, or 10.exd6 Bxf5. 8...Nxd4 9.Qxd4 Nc5 is a common alternative line; a possible continuation is 10.Nc3 0-0 11.Nd5, where an endgame can be reached after 11...d6 12.Nxe7+ Qxe7 13.exd6 Qxd6 14.Qxd6 15.Bb3 Nxb3 16.axb3. 8...Nc5 is also seen for Black, as are 8.Re1 and 9.Re1 for White.

There are some rare early deviations. For Black, 6...b5 and 6...d6 are playable, and 6...Nxe4 transposes to the Riga Variation. 6...Bc5 is weak due to 7.e5, as 7...Ne4, paralleling the 6...Be7 7.e5 line, is well met by 8.Re1. 6.e5 was tried by Mackenzie as an alternative to 6.0-0; it can be met with 6...Nxe4. 7.0-0 Be7 then transposes to the 7.e5 line, but Black can instead play 7...Nc5. On the fifth move, Black can also attempt to transpose to the Open Defence with 5...Nxe4. White can accept this with 6.0-0 or decline by playing 6.Qe2 instead.

=== Wormald Variation: 5.Qe2 ===
Position: a8 black rook, c8 black bishop, d8 black queen, e8 black king, f8 black bishop, h8 black rook, b7 black pawn, c7 black pawn, d7 black pawn, f7 black pawn, g7 black pawn, h7 black pawn, a6 black pawn, c6 black knight, f6 black knight, e5 black pawn, a4 white bishop, e4 white pawn, f3 white knight, a2 white pawn, b2 white pawn, c2 white pawn, d2 white pawn, e2 white queen, f2 white pawn, g2 white pawn, h2 white pawn, a1 white rook, b1 white knight, c1 white bishop, e1 white king, h1 white rook

Wormald Variation: 5.Qe2

5.Qe2, first played in the 1840s, normally continues 5...b5 6.Bb3 Be7 7.c3 followed by 8.d4. Robert Wormald (1834–1876) wrote openings manuals and completed Staunton's last book, analysing the line in Chess World, 1867. The line is also known as Paulsen–Alapin Attack, and Schlechter Variation. Transposition to the Worrall Attack is also common via 7.0-0 or 8.0-0; Black can avoid this by playing 6...Bc5 instead of 6...Be7.

=== Tarrasch Variation: 5.Nc3 ===
5.Nc3 is the Tarrasch Variation, also known as the Four Knights Variation. It can also be reached by transposition from the Four Knights Game after 3.Nc3 Nf6 4.Bb4 a6 5.Ba4, although this is rare. A common line is 5...b5 6.Bb3 and then 6...Be7 or 6...Bc5. White may try to take the initiative with 7.d3 d6 8.Nd5, or alternatively 7.0-0 d6 8.Nd5, where 8...Nxe4 can be met with 9.d4 and 10.Re1. Transposition to the Morphy Attack and other lines is common.

=== Bayreuth Variation: 5.Bxc6 ===
5.Bxc6 is the Bayreuth Variation, also known as the Delayed Exchange Variation or Exchange Variation Deferred. White loses a tempo compared to the standard Exchange Variation, but Black can no longer easily play ...f6 or ...Qf6, common moves in that line. Similarly to the Steenwijk Variation, after 5...dxc6, 6.d3 is the main move, but unlike in the Steenwijk, Black can play 6...Bd6 without losing tempo.

== Black's fourth-move alternatives ==
=== Modern Steinitz Defence: 4...d6 ===
Position: a8 black rook, c8 black bishop, d8 black queen, e8 black king, f8 black bishop, g8 black knight, h8 black rook, b7 black pawn, c7 black pawn, f7 black pawn, g7 black pawn, h7 black pawn, a6 black pawn, c6 black knight, d6 black pawn, e5 black pawn, a4 white bishop, e4 white pawn, f3 white knight, a2 white pawn, b2 white pawn, c2 white pawn, d2 white pawn, f2 white pawn, g2 white pawn, h2 white pawn, a1 white rook, b1 white knight, c1 white bishop, d1 white queen, e1 white king, h1 white rook

Modern Steinitz Defence: 4...d6

4...d6 (ECO C71–C76) is the most common fourth move sideline for Black and has been called the Modern Steinitz Defence, Deferred Steinitz Defence, and Neo-Steinitz Defence. It was frequently played by Alexander Alekhine, José Raúl Capablanca, and Paul Keres. The ability to break the pin with a timely ...b5 gives Black more flexibility than in the regular Steinitz Defence (3...d6). Notably, in the regular Steinitz Defence, White can almost always force Black to surrender the stronghold at e5. In the Modern Steinitz Defence, however, Black retains control of the centre. White's most plausible moves are playable here, including 5.c3, 5.c4, 5.Bxc6, 5.d4, and 5.0-0.

If White plays 5.d4, analogous to the Steinitz Defence, Black can immediately break the pin with 4...b5. After 5.Bb3 Nxd4 6.Nxd4 exd4, the natural 8.Qxd4 is in fact a mistake, as it falls into Noah's Ark Trap. In the game Steiner–Capablanca, Budapest 1929, play continued 8...c5 9.Qd5 Be6 10.Qc6+ Bd7 11.Qd5 c4 when White's bishop is trapped.

The sharp Siesta Variation arises after 5.c3 f5, while a manoeuvring game results from the calmer 5.c3 Bd7 6.d4. The game is also sharp after 5.Bxc6+ bxc6 6.d4 (C73) or 5.0-0 Bg4 6.h3 h5 (C72). The older lines starting with 5.c4 and 5.d4 are not regarded as testing for Black, though the latter offers a tricky gambit.

There are six ECO classifications for the Modern Steinitz. White's responses 5.d4, 5.Nc3, and 5.c4 are included in C71, while 5.0-0 is C72. The delayed exchange 5.Bxc6+ bxc6 6.d4 is C73. C74–C76 all begin with 5.c3. C74 covers 5...Nf6, but primarily focuses on 5...f5 6.exf5 Bxf5 with 7.d4 or 7.0-0. C75's main continuation is 5...Bd7 6.d4 Nge7, the Rubinstein Variation. C76 is characterised by the Black kingside fianchetto 5...Bd7 6.d4 g6.

=== Norwegian Defence: 4...b5 5.Bb3 Na5 ===
Position: a8 black rook, c8 black bishop, d8 black queen, e8 black king, f8 black bishop, g8 black knight, h8 black rook, c7 black pawn, d7 black pawn, f7 black pawn, g7 black pawn, h7 black pawn, a6 black pawn, a5 black knight, b5 black pawn, e5 black pawn, e4 white pawn, b3 white bishop, f3 white knight, a2 white pawn, b2 white pawn, c2 white pawn, d2 white pawn, f2 white pawn, g2 white pawn, h2 white pawn, a1 white rook, b1 white knight, c1 white bishop, d1 white queen, e1 white king, h1 white rook

Norwegian Defence: 4...b5 5.Bb3 Na5

The Norwegian Defence (also called the Taimanov Variation or Wing Variation) (ECO C70), 3...a6 4.Ba4 b5 5.Bb3 Na5, aims to eliminate White's bishop but is generally considered too time-consuming for Black. The usual continuation is 6.0-0 d6 7.d4 Nxb3, but the speculative sacrifice 6.Bxf7+?! Kxf7 7.Nxe5+ Ke7!, which drives the black king out, has been played. With accurate play, however, Black can avoid any disadvantage while holding onto the extra piece, unless White opts to gain a rook and two pawns for two minor pieces after 8.Nf7!? Kxf7 9.Qh5+ g6 (9...Ke7 10.Qe5+) 10.Qd5+ Kg7 11.Qxa8, with a sharp position but advantage for Black.

In the 1950s, Mark Taimanov played it with some success, though it remained a sideline, as it has to this day. This defence has been known since the 1880s and was reintroduced in 1901 by Carl Schlechter. The Norwegian connection was first introduced by Svein Johannessen who played the line from 1957 and later strengthened when Simen Agdestein and some other Norwegian players adopted the variation. In 1995 Jonathan Tisdall published the article "Ruy Lopez. The Norwegian Variation" in New in Chess Yearbook 37.

=== Cordel Defence Deferred: 4...Bc5 ===
The Cordel Defence Deferred combines 3...a6 with the active move ...Bc5. For a century it was believed that it was safer for Black to place the bishop on e7, but it is much more active on c5. White can gain time by playing c3 and d4 as Black's bishop will have to move, but this does not always seem to be as important as was once thought. White also has the option of 5.0-0, which can transpose to the Graz Defence after 5...b5 6.Bb3, but more common are 5...Nge7 and 5...d6.

=== Cozio Defence Deferred: 4...Nge7 ===
Position: a8 black rook, c8 black bishop, d8 black queen, e8 black king, f8 black bishop, h8 black rook, b7 black pawn, c7 black pawn, d7 black pawn, e7 black knight, f7 black pawn, g7 black pawn, h7 black pawn, a6 black pawn, c6 black knight, e5 black pawn, a4 white bishop, e4 white pawn, f3 white knight, a2 white pawn, b2 white pawn, c2 white pawn, d2 white pawn, f2 white pawn, g2 white pawn, h2 white pawn, a1 white rook, b1 white knight, c1 white bishop, d1 white queen, e1 white king, h1 white rook

Cozio Defence Deferred: 4...Nge7

4...Nge7 is the Cozio Defence Deferred. Unlike many other deferred versions of other lines, it is frequently reached by transposition from the standard Cozio Defence (3...Nge7).

It has been advocated by Levon Aronian, and in recent years additional elite players, such as Fabiano Caruana, Dommaraju Gukesh, and Rameshbabu Praggnanandhaa have also begun experimenting with 3...a6 4.Ba4 Nge7. The critical line continues 5.c3 Ng6 6.d4 exd4 7.cxd4 Bb4+ 8.Nc3 d5 9.exd5 Bxc3+ 10.bxc3 Qxd5 11.0-0 0-0, after which White retains the bishop pair, while Black has the better pawn structure.

=== Jaenisch Gambit Deferred: 4...f5 ===
The Jaenisch Gambit Deferred or Jaenisch-Schliemann Gambit Deferred, 3...a6 4.Ba4 f5, is rarely seen, with practically its only top-level appearances being in the 1974 Candidates Final, when Viktor Korchnoi adopted it to ultimately draw the game versus Anatoly Karpov, and by Rameshbabu Praggnanandhaa who won against Vidit Gujrathi in the 2024 Candidates Tournament. It is considered inferior to the regular Jaenisch Gambit since White can respond effectively with 5.d4!, and now both 5...exd4 6.e5 and 5...fxe4 6.Nxe5 Nxe5 7.dxe5 lead to a White advantage.

=== Other lines ===
- After 4...b5 5.Bb3, alternatives to the Norwegian Defence (5...Na5) include 5...Nf6, attempting to transpose to the main line but allowing White the option of 6.d4; 5...Bb7, the Caro Defence, usually transposing to the Arkhangelsk Variation after 5.0-0 Nf6, but also allowing 6.d4; and 5...Bc5, known as the Graz Defence, usually continuing with 5.0-0 or 5.c3, which was analysed by Alois Fink in Österreichische Schachzeitung in 1956 and in Wiener Schach Nachrichten in 1979, although it did not become popular until the 1990s.
- 4...g6 is the Fianchetto Defence Deferred. Like the Cozio Defence Deferred, it is also often reached by transposition from the standard Fianchetto Defence (3...g6), such as via 4.c3 a6 5.Ba4.
- 4...Be7 usually transposes to the main line after 5.0-0 Nf6.

== Exchange Variation: 4.Bxc6 ==
Position: a8 black rook, c8 black bishop, d8 black queen, e8 black king, f8 black bishop, g8 black knight, h8 black rook, b7 black pawn, c7 black pawn, f7 black pawn, g7 black pawn, h7 black pawn, a6 black pawn, c6 black pawn, e5 black pawn, e4 white pawn, f3 white knight, a2 white pawn, b2 white pawn, c2 white pawn, d2 white pawn, f2 white pawn, g2 white pawn, h2 white pawn, a1 white rook, b1 white knight, c1 white bishop, d1 white queen, e1 white king, h1 white rook

Exchange Variation after 4...dxc6. Black has doubled pawns, but has the bishop pair.

In the Exchange Variation, 4.Bxc6, (ECO C68–C69) White damages Black's pawn structure, gaining a ready-made long-term plan of playing d4 and Qxd4, followed by exchanging all the pieces and winning the pure pawn ending. Max Euwe gave the pure pawn ending in this position (with all pieces except kings removed) as a win for White. Black gains good compensation in the form of the bishop pair, however, and the variation is not considered White's most ambitious, though former world champions Emanuel Lasker and Bobby Fischer employed it with success.

After 4.Bxc6, Black almost always responds 4...dxc6. 4...bxc6 is rarely played due to the reply 5.d4 exd4 6.Qxd4 which gives White control of the centre. After 4...dxc6, the obvious 5.Nxe5? is weak, since 5...Qd4! 6.Nf3 Qxe4+ 7.Qe2 Qxe2+ 8.Kxe2 leaves White with no compensation for Black's bishop pair. The most common move is instead 5.0-0, followed by 5.Nc3 and 5.d4.

The flexible 5.0-0 is sometimes called the Barendregt Variation, after the Dutch master Johan Barendregt who frequently played it and was influential in the development of the theory of the line. Fischer developed it into a serious weapon in the 1960s. Unlike 5.d4, it forces Black to defend the e-pawn, usually with 5...f6, 5...Bg4, 5...Qd6 (the sharpest line, preparing queenside castling), 5...Qf6, 5...Qe7, or 5...Bd6. Some other moves that have been played are 5...Ne7, 5...Be7, and 5...Be6. The idea behind these three moves is that if White plays 6.Nxe5, Black plays 6...Qd4, forking the knight and the e-pawn. The move ...Qd4, regaining the pawn at e4, is usually impossible in these variations once White has castled, due to the open e-file. Notable games with 5.0-0 include Fischer–Portisch, and Fischer–Gligorić, both played at the 17th Chess Olympiad in Havana 1966.

After 5.Nc3, Black usually plays 5...f6 to defend the e-pawn. A notable game is Adhiban–Nakamura from the 2013 FIDE World Cup.

After 5.d4, the usual continuation is 5...exd4 6.Qxd4 Qxd4 7.Nxd4, most often followed by 7...Bd7. In the late 19th and early 20th centuries, Emanuel Lasker had great success with this line, most notably his famous win against José Raúl Capablanca in the St. Petersburg 1914 chess tournament.

== Black's third-move alternatives ==
=== Berlin Defence: 3...Nf6 ===
Position: a8 black rook, c8 black bishop, d8 black queen, e8 black king, f8 black bishop, h8 black rook, a7 black pawn, b7 black pawn, c7 black pawn, d7 black pawn, f7 black pawn, g7 black pawn, h7 black pawn, c6 black knight, f6 black knight, b5 white bishop, e5 black pawn, e4 white pawn, f3 white knight, a2 white pawn, b2 white pawn, c2 white pawn, d2 white pawn, f2 white pawn, g2 white pawn, h2 white pawn, a1 white rook, b1 white knight, c1 white bishop, d1 white queen, e1 white king, h1 white rook

Berlin Defence: 3...Nf6

The Berlin Defence (ECO C65-C67), 3...Nf6, is by far Black's most common third-move alternative. It has long had a reputation for solidity and drawishness. The line was common in the late 19th century and early 20th century, being played by Emanuel Lasker and others, though it declined in popularity afterward. After Vladimir Kramnik successfully used the line as a drawing weapon four separate times against Garry Kasparov in their 2000 World Chess Championship match, however, the Berlin experienced a remarkable renaissance. Even players with a dynamic style such as Alexei Shirov, Veselin Topalov, Hikaru Nakamura, and Kasparov himself have tried it, and Magnus Carlsen and Viswanathan Anand both used it (Carlsen extensively so) during the 2013 World Chess Championship and 2014 World Chess Championship. White usually responds with 4.0-0 or 4.d3.

==== Main line: 4.0-0 ====
Position: a8 black rook, c8 black bishop, d8 black king, f8 black bishop, h8 black rook, a7 black pawn, b7 black pawn, c7 black pawn, f7 black pawn, g7 black pawn, h7 black pawn, c6 black pawn, e5 white pawn, f5 black knight, f3 white knight, a2 white pawn, b2 white pawn, c2 white pawn, f2 white pawn, g2 white pawn, h2 white pawn, a1 white rook, b1 white knight, c1 white bishop, f1 white rook, g1 white king

Position after 8...Kxd8: Berlin endgame

White may safely castle as Black's third move does not truly threaten to win White's pawn on e4. If Black captures it, White will always be able to win back the pawn on e5. Following this, Black most often plays 4...Nxe4, the Open Variation.

After 4...Nxe4, the line 5.d4 Nd6 6.Bxc6 dxc6 7.dxe5 Nf5 8.Qxd8+ Kxd8 reaches the starting position of what is called the Berlin endgame. White has a small advantage due to a pawn majority on the kingside, but Black has compensation in the form of the bishop pair. It is difficult for White to exploit the structural superiority without opening the game for Black's bishops. In the Kasparov–Kramnik World-Championship match, all four of the games in which this line was employed ended in draws. Despite its drawish tendency, the Berlin endgame is considered to be the sternest test of the entire variation beginning with 3...Nf6 and is extensively analysed. The modern consensus is that Black can hold the endgame with accurate play.

There are also a number of sidelines that Black can also play which avoid the endgame. These include 5...Be7, the Rio de Janeiro Variation, frequently played by Emanuel Lasker, and 5...a6, which can transpose to the Open Defence after 6.Ba4, though White may opt for 6.Bxc6. There are also the fourth-move alternatives 4...d6, which can end up transposing to lines of the Steinitz Defence (3...d6), and 4...Bc5, the Beverwijk Variation, which can also be reached from the Cordel Defence (3...Bc5).

White can also avoid the queen trade and endgame with 5.Re1, which is also quite drawish but analysed as slightly better for White than the endgame. The primary continuation is 5...Nd6 6.Nxe5 Be7 7.Bf1 Nxe5 8.Rxe5 0-0 9.d4 Bf6 10.Re1 Re8, leading to a position where all of White's pieces are still on the first rank. The line appeared in the 1886 World Chess Championship.

==== Anti-Berlin: 4.d3 ====
Position: a8 black rook, c8 black bishop, d8 black queen, e8 black king, f8 black bishop, h8 black rook, a7 black pawn, b7 black pawn, c7 black pawn, d7 black pawn, f7 black pawn, g7 black pawn, h7 black pawn, c6 black knight, f6 black knight, b5 white bishop, e5 black pawn, e4 white pawn, d3 white pawn, f3 white knight, a2 white pawn, b2 white pawn, c2 white pawn, f2 white pawn, g2 white pawn, h2 white pawn, a1 white rook, b1 white knight, c1 white bishop, d1 white queen, e1 white king, h1 white rook

Anti-Berlin system: 4.d3

An important alternative is 4.d3, dubbed the Anti-Berlin, which avoids the notorious Berlin endgame, but gives up the possibility of playing d2-d4 in one move. Wilhelm Steinitz scored many spectacular successes with it during his reign as World Champion. The main replies for Black are 4...d6 and 4...Bc5, the latter being more popular. White's most important continuations after 4...Bc5 are 5.c3, 5.Bxc6, and 5.0-0. An uncommon reply to 4.d3 is 4...Ne7, which tries to set up the Mortimer Trap.

=== Jaenisch Gambit: 3...f5 ===
Position: a8 black rook, c8 black bishop, d8 black queen, e8 black king, f8 black bishop, g8 black knight, h8 black rook, a7 black pawn, b7 black pawn, c7 black pawn, d7 black pawn, g7 black pawn, h7 black pawn, c6 black knight, b5 white bishop, e5 black pawn, f5 black pawn, e4 white pawn, f3 white knight, a2 white pawn, b2 white pawn, c2 white pawn, d2 white pawn, f2 white pawn, g2 white pawn, h2 white pawn, a1 white rook, b1 white knight, c1 white bishop, d1 white queen, e1 white king, h1 white rook

Jaenisch Gambit: 3...f5

The Jaenisch Gambit, Jaenisch–Schliemann Gambit, or Schliemann Defence (ECO C63), 3...f5, is a sharp line in which Black plays for a kingside attack, frequently sacrificing one or two pawns. The variation was originated by Carl Jaenisch, who analysed it in the December 1847 issue of Le Palamède. Although later named for German lawyer Adolph Schliemann (1817–1872) in the Handbuch des Schachspiels,, the line Schliemann actually advocated for in the 1860s was a gambit variation of the Cordel Defence (3...Bc5 4.c3 f5).

The Jaenisch Gambit is considered to be a good practical weapon, but is positionally risky, especially against a strong and prepared opponent. Teimour Radjabov is currently the only top player who regularly employs this line, with mixed results.

The most common responses for White to 3...f5 are 4.d3 or 4.Nc3, with play after 4.Nc3 fxe4 5.Nxe4 going 5...d5, leading to the most heavily analysed variations of the gambit, with great complications to follow, or 5...Nf6, which generally leads to quieter play. 4.exf5?! is inferior; after 4...e4 5.Qe2 Qe7 6.Bxc6 dxc6 7.Nd4 Nh6 Black has the better of it.

=== Cordel Defence: 3...Bc5 ===
Position: a8 black rook, c8 black bishop, d8 black queen, e8 black king, g8 black knight, h8 black rook, a7 black pawn, b7 black pawn, c7 black pawn, d7 black pawn, f7 black pawn, g7 black pawn, h7 black pawn, c6 black knight, b5 white bishop, c5 black bishop, e5 black pawn, e4 white pawn, f3 white knight, a2 white pawn, b2 white pawn, c2 white pawn, d2 white pawn, f2 white pawn, g2 white pawn, h2 white pawn, a1 white rook, b1 white knight, c1 white bishop, d1 white queen, e1 white king, h1 white rook

Cordel Defence: 3...Bc5

The Cordel Defence, also known as the Classical Defence (ECO C64), 3...Bc5, is possibly the oldest defence to the Ruy Lopez, and has been played occasionally by former world champion Boris Spassky and Boris Gulko. It is uncommon today, however, and was never particularly common, as White will be able to kick the bishop after c3 and d4. White's most common reply is 4.c3, but 4.0-0 is a close second, and 4.Nxe5 and 4.d3 are also seen.

After 4.c3, Black may choose to play 4...f5, the Cordel Gambit, leading to sharp play, after which 5.d4 is considered the strongest reply. The main line of the gambit continues 5...fxe4 6.Bxc6 dxc6 7.Nxe5 Bd6 8.Qh5+ g6 9.Qe2. More solid for Black is 4...Nf6; the usual 5.0-0 transposes to a line of the Beverwijk Variation of the Berlin Defence. 4...Nge7 (typically transposing to the 4.0-0 Nge7 line below), 4...Qf6, and 4...Bb6 are also played. 4...d6 is weak to 5.d4.

White's principal alternative to 4.c3 is 4.0-0. Black can again transpose to the Beverwijk with 4...Nf6, but the most common reply for Black is 4...Nd4. It is a more positional variation; a typical line is 5.Nxd4 Bxd4 6.c3 Bb6 7.d4 c6, followed by 8...d6. Also common for Black are 4...Nge7, which has the main line 5.c3 Bb6 6.d4 exd4 7.cxd4 d5 8.exd5 Nxd5 9.Re1+ Be6 10.Bg5 Qd6 (10...f6 hangs the bishop) 11.Nbd2 0-0 12.Nc4 Qb4, as well as 4...Qf6 and 4...d6, but 4...f5 can be met with 5.exf5 e4 6.Re1.

The fork trick 4.Nxe5 is possible. The name derives from White's play if Black captures the knight: 4...Nxe5 5.d4. Few games have been played with this line, but there is no clear refutation for Black, though 4...Qe7 and 4...Qg5 are strong alternatives to 4...Nxe5.

=== Fianchetto Defence: 3...g6 ===
Position: a8 black rook, c8 black bishop, d8 black queen, e8 black king, f8 black bishop, g8 black knight, h8 black rook, a7 black pawn, b7 black pawn, c7 black pawn, d7 black pawn, f7 black pawn, h7 black pawn, c6 black knight, g6 black pawn, b5 white bishop, e5 black pawn, e4 white pawn, f3 white knight, a2 white pawn, b2 white pawn, c2 white pawn, d2 white pawn, f2 white pawn, g2 white pawn, h2 white pawn, a1 white rook, b1 white knight, c1 white bishop, d1 white queen, e1 white king, h1 white rook

Fianchetto Defence: 3...g6

The Fianchetto Defence, also known as the Smyslov Defence, Barnes Defence, or Pillsbury Defence (part of ECO C60), 3...g6, is a quiet positional system played occasionally by Vasily Smyslov and Boris Spassky, becoming popular in the 1980s when it was shown that 4.c3 a6! gives Black a good game.

It was later discovered that 4.d4 exd4 5.Bg5 gives White the advantage, and as such the variation is rarely played. An interesting gambit line 4.d4 exd4 5.c3 has also been recommended by Alexander Khalifman, although some of the resulting positions have yet to be extensively tested.

=== Cozio Defence: 3...Nge7 ===
Position: a8 black rook, c8 black bishop, d8 black queen, e8 black king, f8 black bishop, h8 black rook, a7 black pawn, b7 black pawn, c7 black pawn, d7 black pawn, e7 black knight, f7 black pawn, g7 black pawn, h7 black pawn, c6 black knight, b5 white bishop, e5 black pawn, e4 white pawn, f3 white knight, a2 white pawn, b2 white pawn, c2 white pawn, d2 white pawn, f2 white pawn, g2 white pawn, h2 white pawn, a1 white rook, b1 white knight, c1 white bishop, d1 white queen, e1 white king, h1 white rook

Cozio Defence: 3...Nge7

The Cozio Defence (part of ECO C60), 3...Nge7, is a distinctly old-fashioned uncommon choice for Black's third move. Although Bent Larsen used it occasionally with success, it remains one of the least explored variations of the Ruy Lopez. The Cozio Defence seeks to avoid doubled pawns on the c-file, as if White captures Black's knight on c6, Black may recapture with Nxc6.

=== Bird's Defence: 3...Nd4 ===
Position: a8 black rook, c8 black bishop, d8 black queen, e8 black king, f8 black bishop, g8 black knight, h8 black rook, a7 black pawn, b7 black pawn, c7 black pawn, d7 black pawn, f7 black pawn, g7 black pawn, h7 black pawn, b5 white bishop, e5 black pawn, d4 black knight, e4 white pawn, f3 white knight, a2 white pawn, b2 white pawn, c2 white pawn, d2 white pawn, f2 white pawn, g2 white pawn, h2 white pawn, a1 white rook, b1 white knight, c1 white bishop, d1 white queen, e1 white king, h1 white rook

Bird's Defence: 3...Nd4

Bird's Defence (ECO C61), 3...Nd4, is an uncommon variation in modern praxis. With careful play White is held to gain an advantage. The best moves are 4.Nxd4 exd4 5.0-0 Bc5 6.d3 c6 7.Ba4 Ne7.

This defence was published in 1843 in Paul Rudolf von Bilguer's Handbuch des Schachspiels and explored by Henry Bird in the late 19th century. Bird played it as Black at least 25 times, scoring +9−13=3 (nine wins, thirteen losses, three draws). Bird's Defence was later used a few times in tournament play by Siegbert Tarrasch, Boris Spassky, and Alexander Khalifman. Although it is still sometimes seen as a surprise weapon, no strong master since Bird has adopted it regularly. The world champion Magnus Carlsen played it as Black in the 2014 Chess Olympiad against Ivan Šarić and lost.

=== Steinitz Defence: 3...d6 ===
Position: a8 black rook, c8 black bishop, d8 black queen, e8 black king, f8 black bishop, g8 black knight, h8 black rook, a7 black pawn, b7 black pawn, c7 black pawn, f7 black pawn, g7 black pawn, h7 black pawn, c6 black knight, d6 black pawn, b5 white bishop, e5 black pawn, e4 white pawn, f3 white knight, a2 white pawn, b2 white pawn, c2 white pawn, d2 white pawn, f2 white pawn, g2 white pawn, h2 white pawn, a1 white rook, b1 white knight, c1 white bishop, d1 white queen, e1 white king, h1 white rook

Steinitz Defence: 3...d6

The Steinitz Defence (also called the Old Steinitz Defence) (ECO C62), 3...d6, is solid but passive and cramped. Although the favourite of the first world champion Wilhelm Steinitz, and often played by world champions and expert defensive players Emanuel Lasker, José Raúl Capablanca, and occasionally by Vasily Smyslov, it largely fell into disuse after World War I, as its inherent passivity spurred a search for more active means of defending the Spanish.

White's most direct approach is 4.d4 immediately challenging Black's pawn on e5, while 4.c3 and 4.0-0 remain viable alternatives. Following 4.d4, Black proceeds with 4...Bd7 which breaks the pin but also defends against White's threat of winning a pawn with 5.Bxc6 and 6.dxe5. Next White plays 5.Nc3 protecting e4 and renewing the threat of winning a pawn to which Black responds with 5...Nf6. After 6.0-0 Be7 7.Re1 Black is forced to concede the centre with 7...exd4, since 7...0-0? leads to the Tarrasch Trap.

The Modern Steinitz Defence (3...a6 4.Ba4 d6) offers Black a freer position and is more popular.

=== Other third moves for Black ===
Even less common third moves for Black include:

- 3...Bb4 (Alapin Defence)
- 3...Qf6 (Frankfurt Defence)
- 3...f6 (Nuremberg Variation)
- 3...Qe7 (Vinogradov Variation)
- 3...Na5 (Pollock's Defence)
- 3...g5 (Brentano Defence)
- 3...b6 (Rotary Defence or Albany Defence)
- 3...d5 (Sawyer's Gambit or Spanish Countergambit)
- 3...Be7 (Lucena Defence)
- 3...a5 (Bulgarian Variation)

== See also ==
- List of chess openings
- List of chess openings named after people
