= Bishop and knight checkmate =

Chess endgame

In chess, the bishop and knight checkmate is the checkmate of a lone king by an opposing king, knight, and bishop. With the stronger side to move, checkmate can be forced in at most thirty-three moves from almost any starting position. Although it is classified as one of the four basic checkmates, (Note: The other basic checkmate patterns against a lone king are king and queen, king and rook, and king and two bishops.) the bishop and knight checkmate occurs in practice only approximately once in every 6,000 games.

== History ==
A method for checkmate applicable when the lone king is in the corner of the opposite color from the bishop (the "wrong" corner, where checkmate cannot be forced), was given by François-André Danican Philidor in the 1777 update to his famous 1749 treatise, L'Analyse des Échecs. He called attention to the route of the knight now known as the "W manoeuvre".

Another method, known as "Delétang's Method" or "Delétang's Triangles", applicable when the lone king is unable to reach the longest diagonal of the color opposite to that of the bishop, involves confining the lone king in a series of three increasingly smaller triangles, ultimately forcing it into a corner of the same color as the bishop (the "right" corner). Some of the ideas of this method date back to 1780, but the complete system was first published in 1923 by Daniel Delétang. The method as propounded is not optimal, but it is relatively simple; so long as White has trapped the king behind the diagonal in a reasonable number of moves, it will lead to mate before the fifty-move rule takes effect.

In 1983, Julius Telesin showed that a king, bishop, and knight can force checkmate on the lone enemy king on an arbitrarily large board, as long as it contains a corner of the color that the bishop travels on. While the other basic checkmates can be forced in O(n) moves on an n × n board, Telesin's method gives an O(n^{2}) bound for a bishop and knight checkmate. It has not been proven whether this is optimal.

== Importance ==
Opinions differ among chess authors as to whether or not a player should learn this checkmate procedure.

Jeremy Silman omitted the bishop-and-knight checkmate from his Complete Endgame Course, claiming he had encountered it only once, and that his friend John Watson had never encountered it. Silman said, "Mastering it would take a significant chunk of time. Should the chess hopeful really spend many of his precious hours he's put aside for chess study learning an endgame he will achieve (at most) only once or twice in his lifetime?" Similarly, Grandmaster Jonathan Hawkins reported only ever encountering the position in a game once.

On the other hand, while grandmaster Andy Soltis concedes that he has never played this endgame and most players will never have it in their career, he argues that learning the checkmate teaches techniques that can be applied elsewhere. James Howell includes the bishop-and-knight checkmate in his book, saying that he has defended against it three times and that it occurs more often than the checkmate with two bishops; he omits the latter from his book. Finally, the checkmate occurred in at least one very notable case: Tal Shaked's victory over Alexander Morozevich in the penultimate round of the 1997 World Junior Chess Championship. Shaked knew the correct mating pattern, and his victory catapulted him to becoming World Junior Champion, whereas a draw would have prevented him from winning the title.

== Method ==
Position: a8 black king, a6 white knight, b6 white king, c6 white bishop

A bishop and knight checkmate pattern that White can force.

Position: a7 black king, b7 white bishop, c7 white king, c6 white knight

An alternate checkmate pattern White can force.

=== Overview ===
This section is adapted from Yasser Seirawan's Winning Chess Endings. It is assumed that White has the bishop and knight.

Since checkmate can only be forced in the corner of the same color as the squares on which the bishop moves (the "right" corner), an opponent who is aware of this will first try to stay in the center of the board, and then move into the "wrong" corner. Thus, there are three phases in the checkmating process:

1. Driving the opposing king to the edge of the board.
2. Forcing the king out of the "wrong" corner to the "right" corner, if necessary.
3. Delivering the checkmate.

=== Phase 1: Forcing the king to the edge ===
Starting position

Position: e3 black king, c1 white knight, e1 white king, f1 white bishop

White's pieces will coordinate to force the black king to the edge of the board.

A wall

Position: c5 black cross, d5 black cross, e5 black cross, f5 black cross, g5 black king, e4 white bishop, f4 black cross, d3 white knight, e3 white king, f3 black cross, f2 black cross

Position after 5.Be4. White's pieces have created a "wall" that prevents Black's king from approaching the center of the board.

To start, White uses their pieces to force the black king to the edge of the board. From the diagrammed starting position:

1. Bg2 Kd4 2. Kd2 Ke5 3. Ke3 Kf5 4. Nd3 Kg5 5. Be4 (White has a wall and will push the king into a corner.) 5... Kf6 6. Kd4 Ke6 7. Kc5 Ke7 8. Kd5 (The black king must now head for one of the two corners. Black opts to head for the h8-corner, where checkmate cannot be forced.) 8... Kf6 9. Kd6 Kf7 10. Ke5 Kg7 11. Ke6 Kg8 12. Ne5! (Centralizing the knight and preparing to force the black king out of the h8-corner.) 12... Kf8 13. Kf6 Kg8 14. Nf7! (Keeping the black king out of the h8-corner. Now White can force the king to the a8-corner [the "right" corner for checkmate].) 14... Kf8

=== Phase 2: Forcing the king to the "right" corner ===
Phase 1 complete

Position: f8 black king, f7 white knight, f6 white king, e4 white bishop

Position after 14...Kf8. In phase 2, White will force the black king to the a8-corner.

Another wall

Position: d8 black king, e8 black cross, c7 black cross, d7 black cross, e7 black cross, a6 black cross, b6 black cross, c6 black cross, d6 white king, b5 white bishop, d5 white knight

Position after 24.Kd6. The black king is confined to the a8-corner.

Now that the black king is trapped on the edge of the board and cannot use the h8-square, White's pieces will coordinate to force the black king to the a8-corner of the board.

15. Bh7 Ke8 16. Ne5! (The knight prevents the black king from escaping via the d7-square.) 16... Kd8 (Though 16... Kf8 might seemingly appear to offer more resistance, since it puts the king closer to the h8-square, it actually loses faster after 17.Nd7+ Ke8 18.Ke6! Kd8 19.Kd6 Ke8 20.Bg6+ Kd8 21.Nc5 Kc8 22.Be8! Kd8 23.Bc6 Kc8 24.Bd7+ Kb8 (24...Kd8? 25.Ne6#) 25.Kc6 Ka7 26.Kc7 Ka8 27.Kb6 with checkmate in two moves.) 17. Ke6 Kc7 18. Nd7! Kb7 19. Bd3! Kc6 (White has created another wall.) 20. Bc4 Kc7 21. Bb5! Kd8 22. Nf6 Kc7 23. Nd5+ Kd8 (Black is now permanently confined to the a8-corner.) 24. Kd6 Kc8 25. Ke7 (Black is forced to the b-file.) 25... Kb8 26. Kd8 Kb7 27. Kd7 Kb8

=== Phase 3: Delivering checkmate ===
Phase 2 Complete

Position: b8 black king, d7 white king, b5 white bishop, d5 white knight

Position after 27...Kb8. The pieces now coordinate to deliver checkmate.

Checkmate

Position: a7 black king, b7 white bishop, c7 white king, c6 white knight

Position after 33.Nc6#

28. Ba6 Ka7 29. Bc8 Kb8 30. Nb4 Ka7 31. Kc7 Ka8 32. Bb7+ Ka7 33. Nc6#

=== Additional techniques ===
==== The "W manoeuvre" ====
Knight's "W manoeuvre"

Position: h8 black king, f6 white king, e5 white knight, d3 white bishop

White to move

Knight moves in this example

Position: b7 four, d7 two, f7 white knight, c5 three, e5 one

f7 (following move 1), e5 (move 4), d7 (move 6), c5 (move 13), and b7 (move 14)

In this position, White has completed phase 1, driving the black king to the h8-corner. Since White has a light-squared bishop, the knight must be used to control the dark squares on the 8th rank, forcing the black king to the h1-square. One of the most efficient ways for White to do this is by moving the knight along the board in a pattern known as the "W manoeuvre".

1. Nf7+ (First step of the maneuver, forcing Black away from h8.) 1... Kg8 2. Bf5 Kf8 3. Bh7 Ke8 4. Ne5 (Second step, preventing Black from escaping via d7.) 4... Kd8 (As in the earlier example, 4... Kf8 leads to a faster mate.) 5. Ke6 Kc7 6. Nd7! (Third step, cutting off b6 and c5; though Black will temporarily be allowed to leave the back rank, White's next moves will contain it to the a8-corner.) 6... Kb7 7. Bd3! Kc6 8. Be2 Kc7 9. Bf3 Kd8 10. Kd6 Ke8 11. Bh5+ Kd8 12. Bf7 Kc8 13. Nc5 (Fourth step, cutting off b7.) 13... Kd8 14. Nb7+ (Final step; king is further contained in the a8-corner. White continues to checkmate.) 14... Kc8 15. Kc6 Kb8 16. Kb6 Kc8 17. Be6+ Kb8 18. Nc5 Ka8 19. Bd7 Kb8 20. Na6+ Ka8 21. Bc6#

==== Delétang's triangle method ====
Position: b8 up-left arrow, d8 black cross, c7 white bishop, d7 black cross, d6 down-right arrow, e6 black cross, c5 white knight, e5 down-right arrow, e4 black cross, f4 down-right arrow, g4 black king, f3 black cross, g3 down-right arrow, h3 black cross, g2 white king, h2 down-right arrow

First net

Position: d8 up-left arrow, f8 black cross, e7 white bishop, f7 black cross, f6 down-right arrow, g6 black cross, e5 white knight, g5 down-right arrow, h5 black king, f4 white king, g4 black cross, h4 down-right arrow

Second net

Position: f8 white bishop, g8 black cross, f7 white king, g7 down-right arrow, h7 black king, g6 black cross, h6 down-right arrow, f5 white knight

Third net

With Delétang's triangle method, White confines the black king into a series of shrinking triangles; the bishop controls the hypotenuse of each triangle, while the knight and king control other squares that prevent the black king's escape. The winning procedure consists of forcing the king to move towards the corner so that the bishop can reach the hypotenuse of the next smaller triangle.

Delétang's triangle method

Position: e6 white knight, g6 white bishop, b2 white king, d2 black king

Starting position. Black cannot cross the b1–h7 diagonal.

From this position, in which Black already cannot cross the b1–h7 diagonal, White wins the following way:

1. Bc2 Ke3 2. Kc1 Ke2 3. Bg6 Ke3 4. Kd1 Kf2 5. Kd2 Kf3 6. Kd3 Kg4 7. Ke3 Kh4 8. Kf4 Kh3 9. Bh5! (The bishop begins shrinking the triangle.) 9... Kg2 10. Nc5 Kf2 11. Ne4+ (Black has no way to escape the second triangle.) 11... Kg2 12. Bg4 Kf1 13. Kf3 Ke1 14. Ke3 Kf1 15. Kd2 Kg2 16. Ke2 Kg1 17. Bh3! (The bishop shrinks the triangle even further.) 17... Kh2 18. Bf1 (Black can now only access the g1-, h1-, and h2-squares. White can now force mate in a few moves.) 18... Kg1 19. Ng5 Kh1 20. Kf2 Kh2 21. Nf3+ Kh1 22. Bg2#

Second triangle

Position: h5 white bishop, e4 white knight, f4 white king, f2 black king

Position after 11.Ne4+. Black cannot cross the d1–h5 diagonal.

Third triangle

Position: e4 white knight, e2 white king, h2 black king, f1 white bishop

Position after 18.Bf1. Black cannot cross the f1–h3 diagonal.

=== Drawing trap ===
Position: c8 black king, e8 white bishop, d6 white king, c4 white knight

White to move

Position: d8 black king, e8 white bishop, b6 white knight, d6 white king

Position after 1.Nb6+?? Kd8!

A drawing trap was noted by the American master Frederick Rhine in 2000 and published in Larry Evans' "What's the Best Move?" column in Chess Life magazine. (Note: An idea essentially identical to this occurs at the climax of a study by A. H. Branton, second prize, New Statesman, 1966.) In the first position here, White would err with 1.Nb6+??. Rather than the expected 1...Kb7??, when White could continue on to hem in the opposing king, Black instead forces a draw with 1...Kd8!. Black is attacking the white bishop, and any bishop move results in stalemate, while a move by any other piece allows 2...Kxe8, an instant draw since the king and knight cannot checkmate by themselves.

== Examples from games ==
The comments in this section are mostly editorial additions and not included in the cited references.

=== Karttunen vs. Rasik ===
U

Position: c7 black king, b5 white king, f4 white knight, f2 white bishop

White to move

PGN text ➤

The ending of the game between Mika Karttunen and Vitezslav Rasik at the 2003 European Chess Club Cup shows the knight's W manoeuvre. From position U, it continued:

84. Bc5 Kb7 85. Nd5 Kb8 86. Kc6 Ka8 87. Nc7+ Kb8 88. Bd4 Kc8 89. Ba7 Kd8 90. Nd5 Ke8 91. Kd6 Kf7 92. Ne7 Kf6? 93. Be3 Kf7 94. Bd4 Ke8 95. Ke6 Kd8 96. Bb6+ Ke8 97. Nf5 Kf8 98. Bc7? Ke8 99. Ng7+ Kf8 100. Kf6 Kg8 101. Bd6 Kh7 102. Nf5 Kg8 103. Kg6 Kh8 104. Bc5 1–0

Checkmate follows after 104...Kg8, 105.Nh6+ Kh8 106.Bd4#. Black could have held out a move longer with 92...Kg7, and 98.Bd8 would have been faster for White.

=== Ljubojević vs. J. Polgár ===
V

Position: e7 white king, g6 black knight, f5 black king, e4 black bishop

Position after 83...Nxg6+

PGN text ➤

Position V is from a blindfold game between Ljubomir Ljubojević and Judit Polgár at the 1994 Amber chess tournament. Play continued:

84. Kd6 Kf6? (Better is 84...Nf4. The white king should run towards a1 so the black king should follow it towards that corner.) 85. Kc5 Ke5 86. Kc4 Bd5+ 87. Kd3 Nf4+ 88. Ke3? (White can resist about seven moves longer by 88.Kc3.) 88... Be4 89. Kd2 Kd4 90. Kc1 Kc3 91. Kd1 Bc2+ 92. Ke1 Kd3 93. Kf2 Ke4 94. Kg3 Bd1 95. Kf2 Nd3+ 96. Kg3 Ke3 97. Kh4 Kf4 98. Kh3 Ne1 99. Kh4 Ng2+ 100. Kh3 Kf3 101. Kh2 Kf2 102. Kh3 Be2 103. Kh2 Bg4 104. Kh1 Ne3 105. Kh2 Nf1+ 106. Kh1 Bf3# 0–1

=== Grandmasters failing to mate ===
Delivering checkmate is difficult if the technique has not been studied and practiced. Even grandmasters, including GM Vladimir Epishin and Women's World Champion GM Anna Ushenina, have obtained the endgame but failed to win it. In the Kempinski–Epishin game, both players made suboptimal moves. The superior side was unable to win and ended up stalemating several moves after the inferior side could have claimed a draw under the fifty-move rule.

Robert Kempinski (2498) vs. Vladimir Epishin (2567) [E60] Bundesliga 0001 Germany (5.3), 07.01.2001

W

Position: e4 white king, c3 black king, d3 black knight, f2 black bishop

Position after 126...Nxd3

X

Position: a8 white king, c7 black bishop, c6 black king, d6 black knight

Position after 140.Ka8

From position W.

127. Kf3 Bc5 128. Ke4 Kc4 129. Kf5 Kd5 130. Kf6 Bd6 131. Kf7 Ne5+ 132. Ke8 Ke6 133. Kd8 Nf7+ 134. Kc8 Kd5 135. Kb7 Kc5 136. Ka6 Bc7 137. Kb7 Kd6 138. Ka6 Kc6 139. Ka7 Nd6 140. Ka8 (position X) Bd8?

140...Nc4 141.Ka7 Nb6 142.Ka6 Bb8 is optimal.

141. Ka7 Kb5 142. Kb8 Kb6 143. Ka8 Nb7 144. Kb8 Bc7+ 145. Ka8 Kc6 146. Ka7 Nc5 147. Ka8 Nd7 148. Ka7 Nb6 149. Ka6 Bb8!

Reaching the same position Black could have forced earlier (see previous note).

150. Ka5 Kc5?

150...Nd5 is optimal.

151. Ka6 Bd6? 152. Kb7 Kb5 153. Ka7 Kc6 154. Ka6 Bb8!

Reaching the same position as after Black's 149th move.

155. Ka5 Nd5!

Belatedly finding the winning move he missed five moves ago.

156. Ka6

Objectively best was 156.Ka4.

156... Bc7?

Missing 156...Nb4+.

157. Ka7 Bb6+ 158. Kb8 Bc5 159. Ka8 Nc7+ 160. Kb8 Nb5 161. Ka8 Kb6 162. Kb8 Na7 163. Ka8 Ka6 164. Kb8 Bb6 165. Ka8 Nb5 166. Kb8 Nd6 167. Ka8 Kb5 168. Kb8 Kc6 169. Ka8 Bc7 170. Ka7 Nb7 171. Ka8 Nc5 172. Ka7 Bb6+ 173. Ka8 Bc7 174. Ka7 Nd7 175. Ka8 Bd6 176. Ka7 Nb6 177. Ka6 Bb8 178. Ka5 Bc7 179. Ka6 Nc8 stalemate ½–½

After the basic king, bishop, and knight versus king position arrived, White was kind enough to allow his king to retreat to the last rank in only six moves. But Black seemed to try to mate White in the wrong corner. Black eventually found a winning line, up to a point, but then failed to find 156...Nb4+ and instead tried again to mate in the wrong corner.

In the game Anna Ushenina–Olga Girya, played in the Geneva tournament of the FIDE Women's Grand Prix 2013–2014, White started phase 2 correctly but missed two chances to finish it.

Y

Position: a4 white bishop, c3 white knight, d3 white king, b2 black king

Position after 72.Nxc3

Z

Position: d4 white knight, d3 white king, a2 white bishop, f2 black king

Position after 81...Kf2

From position Y:

72... Ka1 73. Nd1 Ka2 74. Bc2 Ka1 75. Kc3 Ka2 76. Bb3+ Ka1 77. Ne3 Kb1 78. Nc2 Kc1 79. Ba2 Kd1 80. Nd4 Ke1 81. Kd3 Kf2 (position Z) 82. Bd5?

White should have played this move in place of the previous move or should now continue the W manoeuvre with 82.Ne2! It looks at first as if the black king might run away with 82...Kf3 or 82...Kg2, but in either case 83.Be6 reins it in again. Playing Bd5 at this stage is six moves slower than continuing the W manoeuvre, but White can still continue to mate in the h1-corner by e.g. Ne6, Bc4 sealing the black king behind the b1–h7 diagonal and leading to Delétang's first net.

82... Kg3 83. Ke3

After this move, White cannot prevent the black king escaping the b1–h7 diagonal. The black king can play up the g-file to g6 and the white king has no option but to follow with opposition on the e-file to at least e5, otherwise the black king can escape to the third perimeter at f5 or f6.

83... Kg4 84. Be4

The black king can now escape to f6.

84... Kg5 85. Kf3 Kf6 86. Kf4 Kg7 87. Kg5 Kf7 88. Kf5 Kg7 89. Bd5 Kh6 90. Ne6 Kh7 91. Kf6 Kg8 92. Nf4+ Kh8 93. Be4

This wastes two moves because the knight needs three moves to reach e7 instead of one to reach g6. White should have immediately started the W manoeuvre along the h8–h1 edge, e.g. 94.Bf7 reproducing the position after White's move 77.

93... Kg8 94. Nh3 Kh8 95. Ng5 Kg8 96. Nf7 Kf8 97. Bh7 Ke8 98. Bf5

Quickest is to continue the W manoeuvre with Ne5, but White plans to control g8 with knight instead of bishop, which is three moves slower.

98... Kf8 99. Nh6 Ke8

Now 100.Be6 would seal the king behind the a2–g8 diagonal. White has time to relocate the knight to d3 reaching Delétang's first net.

100. Nf7

White instead abandons the idea.

100... Kf8 101. Ne5 Kg8 102. Ng6

On both preceding moves, playing the W manoeuvre along the h8–a8 edge would have been best.

102... Kh7 103. Be6

White could have reached this position in two moves after move 92.

103... Kh6 104. Bg8 Kh5 105. Ne5 Kh4 106. Kf5 Kg3 107. Bc4?

Missing a second chance to continue the maneuver with 107.Ng4! After White missed this opportunity, Black can now stave off checkmate long enough for the 50-move draw to come into effect.

107... Kf2 108. Kf4 Ke1 109. Ke3 Kd1 110. Bd3 Kc1 111. Nc4 Kd1 112. Nb6 Kc1 113. Na4 Kd1 114. Be4 Kc1 115. Bd3 Kd1 116. Nb2+ Kc1 117. Nc4 Kd1 118. Bg6 Kc1 119. Bf5 Kd1 120. Nb6 Kc1 121. Na4 Kd1 122. Nb2+

As both players now have made fifty consecutive moves without a capture or pawn move, Black could claim the draw now by the 50-move rule. Girya played on for another four moves before actually taking the draw.

122... Kc1 123. Nc4 Kd1 124. Kd3 Kc1 125. Kc3 Kd1 126. Bd3 ½–½

== Quotations ==
- "... I have seen how many chess players, including very strong ones, either missed learning this technique at an appropriate time or had already forgotten it." — Mark Dvoretsky
- "Some masters have already gone back home red with embarrassment after failing or showing poor technique in the execution of this checkmate." — Jesús de la Villa

== See also ==
- Pawnless chess endgame
- Two bishops checkmate
