= Pawnless chess endgame =

Chess positions with few pieces where none of them are a pawn

A pawnless chess endgame is a chess endgame in which only a few pieces remain, and no pawns. The basic checkmates are types of pawnless endgames. Endgames without pawns do not occur very often in real games except for the basic checkmates of king and queen versus king, king and rook versus king, and queen versus rook. Other cases that occur occasionally are (1) a rook and minor piece versus a rook and (2) a rook versus a minor piece, especially if the minor piece is a bishop.

The study of some pawnless endgames goes back centuries by players such as François-André Danican Philidor (1726–1795) and Domenico Lorenzo Ponziani (1719–1796). On the other hand, many of the details and recent results are due to the construction of endgame tablebases. Grandmaster John Nunn wrote a book (Secrets of Pawnless Endings) summarizing the research of endgame tablebases for several types of pawnless endings.

The assessment of endgame positions assumes optimal play by both sides. In some cases, one side of these endgames can force a win; in other cases, the game is a draw (i.e. a book draw).

== Terminology ==
- Major pieces are queens and rooks. Minor pieces are knights and bishops.
- A rank is a row of squares on the chessboard. A file is a column of squares on the board.
- If a player has two bishops, they are assumed to be on opposite colors unless stated otherwise.

When the number of moves to win is specified, optimal play by both sides is assumed. The number of moves given to win is until either checkmate or the position is converted to a simpler position that is known to be a win. For example, with a queen versus a rook, that would be until either checkmate or the rook is captured, resulting in a position that leads to an elementary checkmate.

== Basic checkmates ==
Checkmate can be forced against a lone king with a king plus (1) a queen, (2) a rook, (3) two bishops, or (4) a bishop and a knight. Checkmate is possible with two knights, but it cannot be forced.

== Queen versus rook ==
A queen wins against a lone rook, unless there is an immediate draw by stalemate or due to perpetual check (or if the rook or king can immediately capture the queen). In 1895, Edward Freeborough edited an entire 130-page book of analysis of this endgame, titled The Chess Ending, King & Queen against King & Rook. Normally, the winning process involves first winning the rook with the queen via a fork and then checkmating with the king and queen, but forced checkmates with the rook still on the board are possible in some positions or against incorrect defense. With perfect play, in the worst winning position, the queen can win the rook or checkmate within 31 moves.

Position: d8 black king, f7 white queen, b6 black rook, d5 white king

Black is employing the third rank defense. White can win this position in as few as 19 moves with correct play, starting with 1.Qf4.

The third-rank defense is when the rook is on the third rank or file from the edge of the board, his king is closer to the edge and the enemy king is on the other side (see the diagram). This defense is difficult for a human to defeat. For example, the winning move in the position shown is the counterintuitive withdrawal of the queen from the seventh rank to a more central location:

1. Qf4

From here the queen can make checking maneuvers to win the rook with a fork if the rook moves along the third rank. If the black king emerges from the back rank,

1... Kd7

then

2. Qa4+ Kc7 3. Qa7+

forces Black into a second-rank defense (defending king on an edge of the board and the rook on the adjacent rank or file) after

3... Rb7

when this position is a standard win, as White heads for the Philidor position with a queen versus rook (see the next section). A possible continuation: 4.Qc5+ Kb8 5.Kd6 Rg7 6.Qe5 Rc7 7.Qf4 Kc8 8.Qf5+ Kb8 9.Qe5 Rb7 10.Kc6+ Ka8 11.Qd5 Kb8 12.Qa5 [Philidor—mate in 7].

=== Philidor position ===
Philidor, 1777

Position: b8 black king, b7 black rook, c6 white king, a5 white queen

White wins with either side to move

The Philidor position is a queen vs rook position.

If Black is to move in this position, he quickly loses his rook by a fork (or gets checkmated). For example,

1... Rb1
2. Qd8+ Ka7
3. Qd4+ Ka8
4. Qh8+ Ka7
5. Qh7+

thus forking the rook on b1.

If, on the other hand, White is to move in this position, he would like to be in this position except with Black to move. This can be accomplished by triangulation:

1. Qe5+ Ka8
2. Qa1+ Kb8
3. Qa5

and now it is back to the same arrangement, but Black has to move and is in zugzwang. Nunn describes that with the pieces in the center of the board the queen ought to force the rook towards the Philidor position. Nunn describes the various retreat positions for the rook, the "fourth, third, second" rank defenses, then the "Philidor position". It is usually easy for White to force Black into the Philidor position. When it is Black's turn to play in the Philidor position, the rook can be won in a few moves.

=== Example from game ===
Gelfand vs. Svidler, 2001

Position: e8 black queen, g7 white king, h7 white rook, g5 black king

Black can win this position in as few as 13 moves with optimal play from both sides.

In this 2001 game between Boris Gelfand and Peter Svidler, the player with the queen should win, but the game was drawn because of the fifty-move rule after Black was unable to find the winning maneuvers to fork and capture the rook.

The same position but with colors reversed occurred in a 2006 game between Alexander Morozevich and Dmitry Jakovenko – it was also drawn. At the end of that game, the rook became a desperado, and the game ended in stalemate after the rook was captured (otherwise, the game would have eventually been a draw by threefold repetition).

=== Browne versus Belle ===
The queen versus rook endgame was one of the first endgames completely solved by computers constructing an endgame tablebase. A challenge was issued to Grandmaster Walter Browne in 1978 where Browne would have the queen in a difficult position, defended by Belle using the queen versus rook tablebase. Browne could have won the rook or checkmated in 31 moves with perfect play. After 45 moves, Browne realized that he would not be able to win within 50 moves, according to the fifty-move rule. Browne studied the endgame and, later in the month, played another game from a different starting position. This time, he won by capturing the rook on the 50th move.

Browne versus Belle

Game 1

Position: a8 white king, e8 black rook, f6 black king, a5 white queen

White had a winning position but drew.
Game 2

Position: c8 white king, d8 white queen, c4 black rook, c3 black king

White won.

== Queen versus two minor pieces ==
Defensive fortresses exist for any of the two minor pieces versus the queen. However, except in the case of two knights, the fortress usually cannot be reached against optimal play. (See fortress for more details about these endings.)

Karstedt 1903

Position: e8 white king, g8 black king, g7 black bishop, e5 black knight, h5 white queen

Draw regardless of where White's king and queen are
Ponziani 1782

Position: f7 white queen, b4 black king, a3 black bishop, c3 black knight, a1 white king

Artificial position where the attacking king is confined, draw
Pachman vs. Guimard, 1955

Position: d7 black king, d4 white knight, e4 white king, e3 white bishop, a1 black queen

Position after 68.Nd4, Black wins
Lolli 1763

Position: b7 black king, f7 white king, b6 black bishop, c6 black bishop, e5 white queen

Draw

- Queen versus bishop and knight: A queen normally wins against a bishop and knight, but there is one drawing fortress position forming a barrier against the enemy king's approach. In general, whether a position in this endgame is drawn boils down to whether the defender can reach Karstedt's fortress. Another position given by Ponziani in 1782 is more artificial: the queen's king is confined in a corner by the bishop and knight, which are protected by their king.
- Queen versus two bishops: A queen has a theoretical forced win against two bishops in most positions, but the win may require up to seventy-one moves (a draw can be claimed after fifty moves under the fifty-move rule); there is one drawing fortress position for the two bishops. Lolli's draw (the only fortress in Q vs BB) requires more care for the defender than Karstedt's draw in Q vs BN; the defender must avoid getting a bishop pinned. This ending was thought to be a draw before the advent of endgame tablebases. With that said, the win is quite complicated.
- Queen versus two knights: Two knights can generally draw against a queen if the king is near its knights and they are in a reasonable position by setting up a fortress. The best defense is for the knights to be side by side, with their king placed between them and the enemy king (Lolli's defense). The next-best arrangement of the knights is for them to be diagonally adjacent. The third and riskiest defense is for the knights to be protecting each other. If the knights are cut off from their king, the defender is usually doomed, except in certain unusual positions where the knights trap the enemy king in the corner.

== Common pawnless endings (rook and minor pieces) ==
John Nunn lists these types of pawnless endgames as being common: (1) a rook versus a minor piece and (2) a rook and a minor piece versus a rook.

Topalov vs. J. Polgar, 2008

Position: h7 white bishop, e6 black rook, d4 black king, b3 white king

White to move, draw
- Rook versus a bishop: This is usually a draw. The main exception is when the defending king is trapped in a corner that is of the same color square as his bishop (see Wrong bishop § Rook versus bishop). If the defending king is trapped in a corner that is the opposite color as his bishop, he draws (see Fortress (chess) § Fortress in a corner). See the game of Veselin Topalov versus Judit Polgar, where Topalov defended and drew the game to clinch a win of their 2008 Dos Hermanas match. In general, the attacker can force stalemate but not checkmate.
- Rook versus a knight: This is usually a draw. There are two main exceptions: the knight is separated from the king and may be trapped and won or the king and knight are poorly placed. Kamsky versus Bacrot, 2006 is an example of a rook versus knight ending which resulted in a win. In this game, Black underpromoted a pawn to a knight to avoid a checkmate and eventually lost the game after allowing his knight to be separated from the king.
- Rook and a bishop versus a rook: This is one of the most common pawnless endgames and is usually a theoretical draw. However, the rook and bishop have good winning chances in practice because the defense is difficult. There are some winning positions such as the Philidor position, which occurs relatively often. There are two main defensive methods: The Cochrane Defense and the "second rank defense". Forced wins require up to 59 moves. As a result, FIDE extended the fifty-move rule to 100 moves and then to 75 moves for this endgame, before returning to 50 moves. See rook and bishop versus rook endgame for more information.
- Rook and a knight versus a rook: This is usually a simple draw with few winning positions. The winning positions require the defending king to be badly placed near a corner; this can not be forced in general. The Cochrane Defense can be used.

Rook versus knight

La Bourdonnais vs. McDonnell, 1834

Position: b8 white rook, a7 black knight, a5 black king, c5 white king

Position after 92...Ka5, draw

Karpov vs. Ftáčnik, 1988

Position: f7 white rook, b6 black knight, e6 white king, h3 black king

Black to move. This combination is usually a draw but here White wins because the black king and knight are far apart.

Rook and bishop versus rook

Philidor, 1749

Position: d8 black king, e7 black rook, d6 white king, d5 white bishop, f1 white rook

White to move wins, Black to move draws.
Timman vs. Lutz, 1995

Position: e6 black king, b5 white king, c5 white bishop, h4 black rook, g3 white rook

Black to move, drawn 52 moves later.

Rook and knight versus rook

J. Polgar vs. Kasparov, 1996

Position: e8 white rook, h4 white king, f3 black king, e2 black knight, g1 black rook

Position before White's 70th move, a draw with correct play. Polgar blundered on move 79 and resigned after move 90.
Alekhine vs. Capablanca, 1927

Position: a7 black rook, d7 black knight, d6 black king, d4 white king, b2 white rook

White to move, the game was drawn twelve moves later. The white king cannot be driven to the edge.

== Miscellaneous pawnless endings ==
Other types of pawnless endings have been studied. Of course, there are positions that are exceptions to these general rules stated below.

The fifty-move rule is not taken into account, and it would often be applicable in practice. When one side has two bishops, they are assumed to be on opposite colored squares, unless otherwise stated. When each side has one bishop, the result often depends on whether or not the bishops are on the same color, so their colors will always be stated.

=== Queens only ===
Comte vs. Le Roy, France, 1997

Position: h8 white queen, a7 black queen, b4 black king, e3 white queen, f2 white king, a1 black queen

Whoever moves first wins (Nunn)
- Queen versus queen: usually a draw, but the side to move first wins in 41.75% of the positions. There are some wins when one queen is in the corner, e.g. as a result of promoting a rook pawn or bishop pawn.
- Two queens versus one queen: Almost always a win. A cross-check may be necessary, see Cross-check (chess) § Two queens versus one for an example. A draw is possible in a few exceptional positions if the weaker side has an immediate perpetual check, e.g. with a white king on a1 and white queens on a2 and b1, the black king on e8, and the black queen giving check on d4. Black has an unlimited supply of checks on d4, a4, and d1, and the white king cannot escape the corner.
- Two queens versus two queens: The first to move wins in 83% of the positions (see the Comte vs. Le Roy diagram for an example). Wins require up to 44 moves.

=== Major pieces only ===
Centurini 1885
(Fine & Benko diagram 1096)

Position: g8 black rook, h8 black king, g7 black rook, a1 white queen, h1 white king

Black to move draws. Black would win with the king on h7 instead.
- Queen versus rook: see above.
- Queen versus two rooks: this is usually a draw, but either side may have a win.
- Queen versus three rooks: this is nearly always a win for the rooks. This is rare in serious play, and occurs when promoting to a queen would give stalemate, but three rooks versus a queen is usually a straightforward win, especially when the defending king must be quite well confined for stalemate to be an issue for QRR v Q.
- Queen and a rook versus a queen and a rook: Despite the equality of material, the player to move first wins in 83% of the positions. In a rook and pawn ending, if both sides queen a pawn, the side that gives check first frequently wins.
- Queen and rook versus a queen: this is a win.
- Two rooks versus a rook: this is usually a win because the attacking king can usually escape checks by the opposing rook (which is hard to judge in advance).
- Rook versus rook: this is normally a draw, but a win is possible in some positions where one of the kings is in the corner or on the edge of the board and threatened with checkmate. See for example the Saavedra position.

=== Queens and rooks with minor pieces ===
Position: b7 white king, a6 white rook, a3 white knight, d3 black queen, c1 black king

White's knight is trapped by the black queen, but the white rook cannot be driven from its defense. This position is a draw.
- Queen versus a rook and a minor piece: this is usually a draw. The queen has good winning chances if the king and rook are near one edge and the minor piece is near the opposite edge. In the case of the knight, the queen can trap it on the edge; then the king assists in winning it. Against the bishop, the queen makes moves eventually forcing the bishop onto a square where it can be won.
- Two rooks and a minor piece versus a queen: this is usually a win for the three pieces, but it can take more than fifty moves.
- Queen and a minor piece versus a rook and minor piece: this is normally a win for the queen.
- Rook and two minor pieces versus a queen: draw.
- Queen and a minor piece versus two rooks: this is usually a draw for a knight and a win for a bishop, although the win takes up to eighty-five moves. The best method of defense is to double the rooks on the third rank with the opposing king on the other side and keep the king behind the rooks, though this does not always guarantee the draw. This case with a bishop and queen versus rooks is unusual in that such a small material advantage forces a win. It was thought to be a draw by human analysis, but computer analysis revealed a long forced win.
- Queen and a minor piece versus a rook and two minor pieces: In a typical stable position, queen and knight win against rook, bishop, and knight, but mating requires up to 545 moves. Other piece combinations are a draw, except that a queen and a minor piece win against a rook and a same colored bishop pair. The KQN v KRBN win is surprising since the difference in material is only one point (other pawnless combinations up to seven pieces require greater difference to win), and a queen and a minor piece draw against a queen. However, compared to KQ, KRBN is vulnerable to fork and capture by the opposing queen, and KRBN is slowly outmaneuvered by KQN, until KQN wins a piece or a rook–knight exchange. Also, while in most open endgames, a knight is weaker than a bishop, a queen and a knight make a strong attacking combination. Also, two knights make a strong defense if the superior side does not have an extra piece that can be exchanged for the two knights, and we have KQ v KNN draw (and thus KQN v KRNN draw) despite KRB v KNN win.
- Queen, rook, and minor piece versus queen and rook: as of 2006, had not been analyzed, but was thought to be too volatile to draw general conclusions.

In endgames with queens, a minor piece advantage is not often decisive. Tempo is often more important than material in these situations. Two queens can win against two queens and a knight about half the time, when they have the move.

=== Queens and minor pieces ===
Kling & Horowitz, 1851

Position: f8 white bishop, h8 black king, f7 white bishop, f6 white king, e5 white knight, f5 white knight, f1 black queen

Black is unable to prevent checkmate.
- Queen versus one minor piece: a win for the queen. (Against a lone bishop, it is almost as easy as mating versus the lone king, because the bishop is powerless on the opposite-colored squares. The lone knight offers stiffer resistance.)
- Queen versus two minor pieces: see above.
- Queen versus three minor pieces: draw except for a queen versus three bishops all on the same color, which in many positions is a win for the queen.
- Four minor pieces versus a queen: a win for the pieces if they are the usual four minor pieces (see the position from Kling and Horowitz). Alexey Troitsky showed that four knights win against a queen.
- Queen and a minor piece versus a queen: this is usually a draw unless the stronger side can quickly win (see Nyazova vs. Levant and Spassky vs. Karpov). With a knight, however, the stronger side has good winning chances in practice because the knight can create non-linear threats to fork the opponent's pieces and very accurate play is required from the defender to hold the position. There are 38 positions of reciprocal zugzwang and the longest win takes 35 moves until the knight forks the queen and king.
- Queen and two minor pieces versus queen and one minor piece: generally a draw except in the case QBB vs QN (won for the bishops). Many combinations involve extremely long winning lines.

==== Examples from games ====
Nyazova vs. Levant, USSR 1976

Position: e8 white queen, f7 white king, h5 white knight, g4 black king, h1 black queen

White to move wins with 1.Qg8+ or 1.Qe6+.

An endgame with queen and knight versus queen is usually drawn, but there are some exceptions where one side can quickly win material. In the game between Nyazova and Levant, White won:

1. Qe6+ Kh4

If 1...Kxh5? then 2.Qg6+ Kh4 3.Qh6+ skewers the black queen.

2. Qf6+ Kh3
3. Qc3+ Kg2
4. Qd2+ Kg1
5. Qe3+ Kg2
6. Nf4+ 1–0

If 6...Kf1 then 7.Qe2+ Kg1 8.Qe1+ Kh2 9.Qf2+ Qg2 10.Qxg2#.

White could have won more quickly by 1.Qg8+ Kh4 2.Qg3+ Kxh5 3.Qg6+ Kh4 4.Qh6+ and White skewers the black queen.

Spassky vs. Karpov, 1982

Position: b6 black king, b4 black queen, b3 white knight, d3 white king, b2 white queen

Position after 68.Nxb3, a theoretical draw

The second position is from a 1982 game between former world champion Boris Spassky and then world champion Anatoly Karpov. The position is a theoretical draw but Karpov later blundered in time trouble and resigned on move 84.

==== Example from a study ====
V. Halberstadt, 1967

Position: b8 black king, f7 black queen, f6 white bishop, e3 white king, f1 white queen

White to move and win

In this 1967 study by Vitaly Halberstadt, White wins. The solution is:

1. Be5+ Ka8 2. Qb5!

Not 2.Qxf7?? stalemate.

2... Qa7+! 3. Ke2! Qb6! 4. Qd5+ Qb7 5. Qa5+ Qa7 6. Qb4! Qa6+ 7. Kd2! Qc8 8. Qa5+ Kb7 9. Qb5+ Ka8 10. Bd6! Qb7 11. Qe8+ Ka7 12. Bc5+ Ka6 13. Qa4#.

=== Rooks and minor pieces ===
Horwitz & Kling, 1851

Position: f7 black king, g6 black bishop, e5 black bishop, d2 white rook, c1 white king, d1 white rook

White to move wins
Karpov vs. Kasparov, 1991

Position: d8 black rook, c6 white bishop, f6 black king, f4 white knight, h4 white king, d3 white knight

Position after 63.Kxh4. The game was drawn on move 115.
- Two rooks versus two minor pieces: this is normally a win for the rooks. Henri Rinck discovered more than 100 positions that are exceptions.
- Two bishops and a knight versus a rook: this is usually a win for the three pieces but it takes up to sixty-eight moves. Howard Staunton analyzed a position of this type in 1847, and correctly concluded that the normal result of this ending is a win for the three minor pieces.
- A bishop and two knights versus a rook: this is usually a draw, but there are some wins for the three pieces requiring up to forty-nine moves. Staunton in 1847 correctly concluded that the normal result of this endgame is a draw. Bernhard Horwitz and Josef Kling gave the same appraisal in 1851. During adjournment of the Karpov versus Kasparov game, Kasparov (initially unsure if it is a draw) analyzed that a successful defense is having the king near a corner that the bishop does not control, keeping the rook far away to prevent forks, and threatening to sacrifice it (for stalemate or for the bishop, which results in a draw, see two knights endgame). Tablebases show that it is usually a draw, no matter which corner the defending king is in. (See the position from the Karpov versus Kasparov game for a drawn position, and see Fifty-move rule § Karpov vs. Kasparov, 1991 for more discussion of this game.) Curiously, Grandmaster James Plaskett also had an adjournment of a London league game at the same time, versus David Okike; the last week of October 1991. After resumption it quickly resolved itself into the same pawnless ending. That game, too, was drawn.
- Rook and a bishop versus two knights: this is usually a win for the rook and bishop but it takes up to 223 moves. The result of this endgame was unknown until computer analysis proved the forced win.
- Rook and a knight versus two knights: this is usually a draw, but there are some wins for the rook and knight that take up to 243 moves.
- Rook and a knight versus a bishop and knight: this is usually a draw, but there are some wins for the rook and knight that take up to 190 moves.
- Rook and a bishop versus a bishop and knight: this is usually a draw if the bishops are on the same color. It is usually a win for the rook and bishop if the bishops are on opposite colors, but wins take up to ninety-eight moves. Magnus Carlsen successfully converted this configuration with opposite-colored bishops within the 50-move limit against Francisco Vallejo Pons in 2019. Even with best play from the starting RB v BN position, the stronger side would have won a piece well within 50 moves.
- Rook and a bishop versus two bishops: this is usually a draw, but there are some long wins if the defending bishops are on the same color.
- Rook and a knight versus two bishops: this is usually a draw if the defending bishops are on opposite colors. It is a win if the defending bishops are on the same color, but it can take up to 140 moves.
- Rook versus two minor pieces: this is normally a draw.
- Two rooks versus three minor pieces: this is normally a draw.
- Rook and two minor pieces versus a rook: a win for the three pieces. With two knights, White must not exchange rooks and avoid losing a knight, but the three pieces have great checkmating power.
- Rook and two minor pieces versus rook and one minor piece: a win for the three pieces, see § Examples with an extra minor piece below.
- Two rooks and a minor piece versus two rooks: a win if the minor piece is a bishop. Normally a draw if the minor piece is a knight, but some very long wins exist. That being said, with so many major pieces on the board most positions are not tactically quiet, so general conclusions are difficult to draw.
- Two rooks versus four bishops: normally a draw (if the bishops come in two pairs).

=== Minor pieces only ===
Kling & Horowitz, 1851

Position: f8 white bishop, b7 black knight, b6 black king, d5 white king, a4 white bishop

This is a semi-fortress, but White wins in 45 moves.
Encyclopedia of Chess Endings (ECE) #1907, Belle

Position: b5 white bishop, e2 black knight, b1 white king, c1 white bishop, d1 black king

1.Ba4+ wins (the only move that forces a win). White wins the knight on move 66, converting the position to a basic checkmate.

- Trivial cases: These are all trivial draws in general: bishop only, knight only, bishop versus knight, bishop versus bishop, knight versus knight.
- Two minor pieces:
  - Two bishops is a basic checkmate (if the bishops are on opposite colors)
  - A bishop and knight is a basic checkmate, see bishop and knight checkmate
  - Two knights cannot force checkmate, see two knights endgame
- Two minor pieces versus one minor piece:
  - Two bishops versus a knight: this is a win (except for a few trivial positions where Black can immediately force a draw), but it can take up to 66 moves. See Chess endgame § Effect of tablebases on endgame theory, Fortress (chess) § Semi-fortress in two bishops vs. knight and see the example from the Botvinnik versus Tal game below. Also see the tournament game of Manotas vs van Riemsdijk, where Black (the side with the bishops) broke the Kling and Horwitz semi-fortress and won the knight.
  - Other cases: this is normally a draw in all other cases. Edmar Mednis considered the difficulty of defending these positions:
    - Two bishops versus one bishop: The easiest for the defender to draw, unless the defending king is caught in a corner.
    - Two knights versus one bishop: any normal position is an easy draw.
    - Two knights versus one knight: an easy draw if the defending king is not trapped on the edge. However, if the king is trapped on the edge, there may be a win similar to the two knights versus a pawn endgame.
    - Bishop and knight versus a bishop on the same color: may be lost if the defending king is on the edge; otherwise an easy draw.
    - Bishop and knight versus a bishop on the opposite color: normally a draw but the defense may be difficult if the defending king is confined near a corner that the attacking bishop controls.
    - Bishop and knight versus a knight: best winning chances (other than two bishops versus knight). The difficulty of defense is not clear and the defending knight can be lost if it is separated from its king.
- Three minor pieces versus one minor piece: a win except in some unusual situations involving an underpromotion to a bishop on the same color as a player's existing bishop. More than fifty moves may be required to win. Three knights win against one knight (see for example Branka Vujic-Katanic vs. Marija Petrovic 1985).
- Three minor pieces versus two minor pieces: if neither player has a pair of same-colored bishops, this is a won endgame exactly when the stronger side has the bishop pair and the weaker side lacks it (i.e. BBN vs BN or BBN vs NN). Otherwise, it is a draw. Unusual situations where underpromotion has resulted in one player's having two bishops travelling on the same colors are more complicated: for example, BBN (different colors) vs BB (same colors) is not a general win, but contains some very long winning lines.
- Three knights can force checkmate against a lone king within 20 moves (unless the defending king can win one of the knights), but this combination of pieces can only happen if the attacking side has underpromoted a pawn to a knight.

==== Example from game ====
Botvinnik vs. Tal, 1961

Position: a6 white king, e6 black king, b4 black bishop, b3 white knight, g2 black bishop

Position after 77.Kxa6, Black wins

An ending with two bishops versus a knight occurred in the seventeenth game of the 1961 World Chess Championship match between Mikhail Botvinnik and Mikhail Tal. The position occurred after White captured a pawn on a6 on his 77th move, and White resigned on move 84.

77... Bf1+
78. Kb6 Kd6
79. Na5

White to move could reach the semi-fortress from this position: 1.Nb7+ Kd5 2.Kc7 Bd2 3.Kb6 Bf4 4.Nd8 Be3+ 5.Kc7. White gets his knight to b7 with his king next to it to form a long-term fortress.

79... Bc5+
80. Kb7 Be2
81. Nb3 Be3
82. Na5 Kc5
83. Kc7 Bf4+ 0–1

The game might continue 84.Kd7 Kb6 85.Nb3 Be3, followed by ...Bd1 and ...Bd4, for example 86.Kd6 Bd1 87.Na1 Bd4 88.Kd5 Bxa1.

== Examples with an extra minor piece ==
An extra minor piece on one side with a queen versus queen endgame or rook versus rook endgame is normally a theoretical draw. An endgame with two minor pieces versus one is also drawn, except in the case of two bishops versus a knight. But a rook and two minor pieces versus a rook and one minor piece is different. In these two examples from games, the extra minor piece is enough to win.

R. Blau vs. Unzicker, 1949

Position: e6 black king, d5 black knight, e5 white bishop, g5 white rook, c4 black bishop, h3 black rook, b2 white king

Black to move, wins

In this position, if the bishops were on the same color, White might have a chance to exchange bishops and reach an easily drawn position. (Exchanging rooks would also result in a draw.) Black wins:

1... Re3
2. Bd4 Re2+
3. Kc1 Nb4
4. Bg7 Rc2+
5. Kd1 Be2+
6. resigns, because 6. Ke1 Nd3 is checkmate.

Vladimorov vs. Palatnik, 1977

Position: e8 white rook, b7 black bishop, e7 black bishop, e6 black king, b4 black rook, f4 white bishop, g3 white king

Black to move, wins

In this position, if White could exchange bishops (or rooks) he would reach a drawn position. However, Black has a winning attack:

1... Rb3+
2. Kh2 Bc6
3. Rb8 Rc3
4. Rb2 Kf5
5. Bg3 Be4
6. Re2 Bg5
7. Rb2 Kg4
8. Rf2 Rc1
9. resigns

Speelman gave these conclusions in 1981:

- Rook and two bishops versus rook and bishop – thought to be a win
- Rook, bishop, and knight versus rook and bishop – good winning chances, probably a win if the bishops are on opposite colors
- Rook, bishop, and knight versus rook and knight – thought to be a win.

Later tablebase analysis confirmed that rook and two minor pieces versus rook and one minor piece is a general win.

== Summary ==
Grandmaster Ian Rogers summarized several of these endgames.

Recap of some pawnless endgames
Attacker	Defender	Status	Assessment
		Win	Difficult, if defender knows the best defensive techniques
		Draw	Easy, if defender goes to the correct corner
		Draw	Easy
		Draw	Easy, if the Cochrane Defense is used
		Draw	Easy
		Draw	Easy, but use care
		Win	Easy
		Draw	Easy
		Draw	Easy
		Draw	Difficult

General result

John Nunn also covers many pawnless chess endings in his book. He gives a "general result", which he describes as: "derived ... not by looking at statistics for winning percentages, which can be very misleading, but by personally examining the endings concerned."

== Fine's rule ==
In his landmark 1941 book Basic Chess Endings, Reuben Fine inaccurately stated, "Without pawns one must be at least a Rook ahead in order to be able to mate. The only exceptions to this that hold in all cases are that the double exchange wins and that a Queen cannot successfully defend against four minor pieces." Kenneth Harkness also stated this "rule". Fine also stated "There is a basic rule that in endings without pawns one must be at least a rook ahead to be able to win in general." This inaccurate statement was repeated in the 2003 edition revised by Grandmaster Pal Benko. However, Fine recognized elsewhere in his book that a queen wins against a rook and that a queen normally beats a knight and a bishop (with the exception of one drawing fortress). The advantage of a rook corresponds to a five-point material advantage using the traditional relative value of the pieces (pawn = 1, knight = 3, bishop = 3, rook = 5, queen = 9). It turns out that there are several more exceptions, but they are endgames that rarely occur in actual games. Fine's statement has been superseded by computer analysis.

A four-point material advantage is often enough to win in some endings without pawns. For example, a queen wins versus a rook (as mentioned above, but 31 moves may be required); as well as when there is matching additional material on both sides, i.e.: a queen and any minor piece versus a rook and any minor piece; a queen and a rook versus two rooks; and two queens versus a queen and a rook. Another type of win with a four-point material advantage is the double exchange – two rooks versus any two minor pieces. There are some other endgames with four-point material differences that are generally long theoretical wins. In practice, the fifty-move rule comes into play because more than fifty moves are often required to either checkmate or reduce the endgame to a simpler case: two bishops and a knight versus a rook (requires up to 68 moves); and two rooks and a minor piece versus a queen (requires up to 82 moves for the bishop, 101 moves for the knight).

A three-point material advantage can also result in a forced win, in some cases. For instance, some of the cases of a queen versus two minor piece are such positions (as mentioned above). In addition, the four minor pieces win against a queen. Two bishops win against a knight, but it takes up to 66 moves if a bishop is initially trapped in a corner.

There are some long general theoretical wins with only a two- or three-point material advantage, but the fifty-move rule usually comes into play because of the number of moves required: two bishops versus a knight (66 moves); a queen and bishop versus two rooks (two-point material advantage, can require 84 moves); a rook and bishop versus a bishop on the opposite color and a knight (a two-point material advantage, requires up to 98 moves); and a rook and bishop versus two knights (two-point material advantage, but it requires up to 222 moves).

Finally, there are some other unusual exceptions to Fine's rule involving underpromotions. Some of these are (1) a queen wins against three bishops of the same color (no difference in material points), up to 51 moves are required; (2) a rook and knight win against two bishops on the same color (two point difference), up to 140 moves are needed; and (3) three bishops (two on the same color) win against a rook (four point difference), requiring up to 69 moves, and (4) four knights win against a queen (85 moves). This was proved by computer in 2005 and was the first ending with seven pieces that was completely solved. (See endgame tablebase.)

== General remarks on these endings ==
Many of these endings are listed as a win in a certain number of moves. That assumes perfect play by both sides, which is rarely achieved if the number of moves is large. Also, finding the right moves may be exceedingly difficult for one or both sides. When a forced win is more than fifty moves long, some positions can be won within the fifty move limit (for a draw claim) and others cannot. Also, generally all of the combinations of pieces that are usually a theoretical draw have some non-trivial positions that are a win for one side. Similarly, combinations that are generally a win for one side often have non-trivial positions which result in draws.

== Tables ==
This a table listing several common pawnless endings, the number of moves in the longest win, and the winning percentage for the first player. The winning percentage can be misleading – it is the percentage of wins out of all possible positions, even if a piece can immediately be captured or won by a skewer, pin, or fork. The largest number of moves to a win is the number of moves until either checkmate or transformation to a simpler position due to winning a piece. Also, the fifty-move rule is not taken into account.

=== 3- 4- 5-man ===
Attacking pieces	Defending pieces	Longest win	Winning %
		10	100
		16	100
		13	41.7
		35	99.0
		19	29.1
		29	35.1
		40	48.3
		19	99.98
		33	99.5
		30	99.1
		67	97.0
		33	55.7
		41	50.1
		70	71.2
		69	78.2
		81	96.3
		53	97.6
		72	94.0
		65	41.2
		37	36.6
		78	97.8

=== 6-man ===
Attacking pieces	Defending pieces	Longest win	Winning %
		262	70.1
		238	94.5
		209	61.5
		174	78.0
		121	51.3
		117	67.7
		114	80.6
		112	93.7
		108	90.5
		107	99.3
		107	86.8
		106	49.0
		92	59.3
		90	92.7
		89	75.0
		89	70.3
		85	93.1
		83	80.8
		69	81.8
		69	52.0
		67	57.6
		58	41.9
		56	36.7
		53	58.7
		53	31.0
		50	61.1
		49	34.8
		45	91.2
		44	37.6
		43	41.1
		42	45.5
		40	47.6
		39	43.5

=== 7-man ===
Attacking pieces	Defending pieces	Longest win (distance to mate)	Winning %
		545	62.79 (85.6 with White to move, 39.98 with Black to move)
		304	?
		262	?
		262	?
		246	?
		246	?
		238	?
		229	?
		210	?
		197	?
		195	?
		192	?
		182	?
		176	?
		169	?
		154	?
		152	?
		150	?
		140	?
		134	?
		122	?
		120	?
		115	?
		112	?
		98	?
		88	?
