= Diplomat chess =

Chess variant

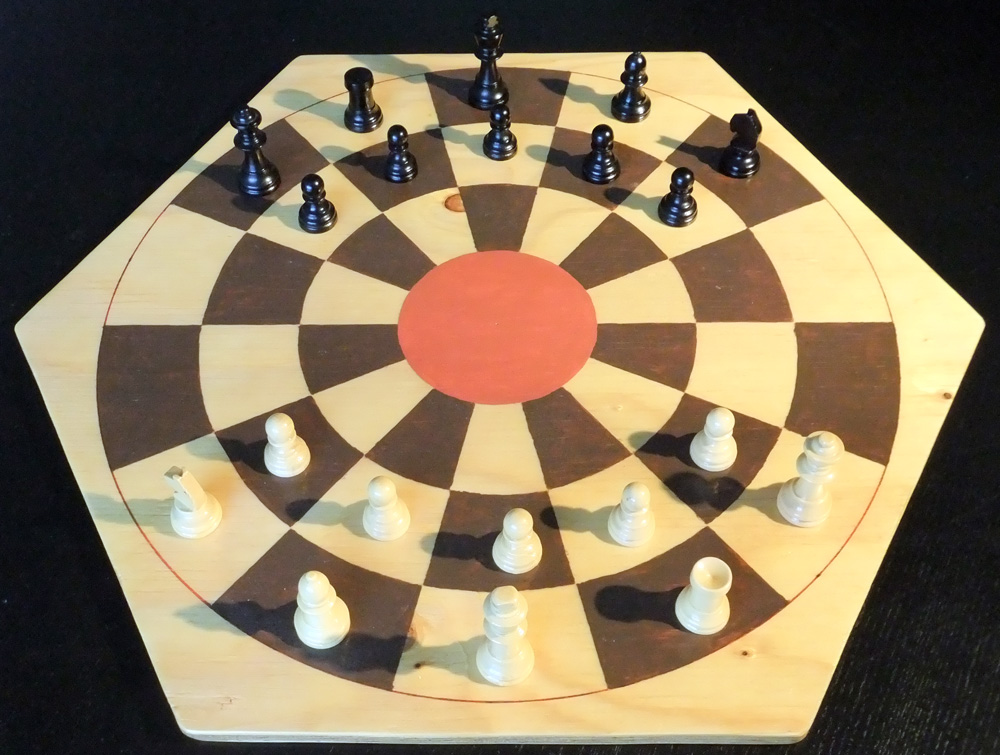
- A diplomat chess game (with queen pieces used as diplomats)
- Genres: Chess variant
- Players: 2
- Setup time: ~1 minute
- Skills: Strategy, tactics

Diplomat chess is a chess variant invented by Carlos Martín-Fuertes in 2003 as a contribution to a contest to design a chess variant on 43 squares, organised by The Chess Variant Pages. It is played on a circular board with 43 cells, including the center circle which is considered orthogonal and diagonal to every adjacent cell. The game includes a fairy piece called the 'diplomat' which instead of capturing can suborn enemy pieces.

== Rules ==
The game is won by checkmating or stalemating the enemy king.

When one position is repeated three times, the games is automatically declared a draw. The same happens when both kings are the only remaining pieces on the board.

=== Setup ===
The board consists of three concentric circles with 14 cells each and a center cell. The pieces are identical to those in orthodox chess with the following exceptions: An extra piece called the diplomat is added. The horse is the same as the knight in orthodox chess. There is no queen.

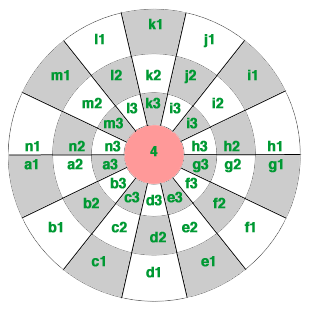

White:

- King on d1
- Rook on e1
- Diplomat on f1
- Bishop on c1
- Horse (knight) on b1
- Pawns on b2, c2, d2, e2 and f2.

Black:

- King on k1
- Rook on l1
- Diplomat on m1
- Bishop on j1
- Horse (knight) on i1
- Pawns on i2, j2, k2, l2 and m2.

=== Movement ===
White moves first.

In general, the pieces move as in orthodox chess, with the center (cell 4) being considered orthogonal and diagonal to every adjacent cell.

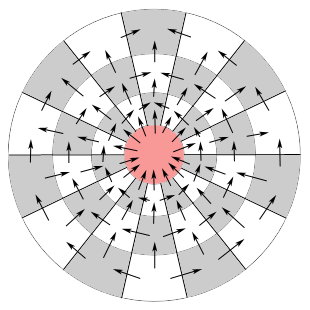
Pawn movement

Pawns move one step orthogonally forward and capture to one step diagonally forward, as in orthodox chess. A movement "forward" can be defined as one that places the pawn closer to the starting cell of its enemy king. Then pawns can capture to the sides of the cells they can move to. There is no double move and no en passant move.

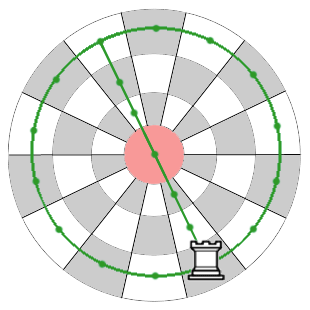
Rook movement

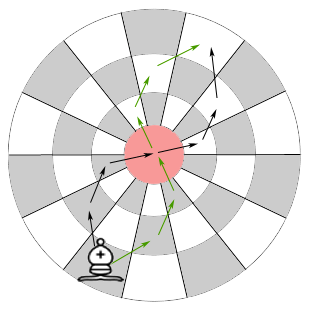
Bishop movement

The rook, bishop, horse (knight) and king move as in orthodox chess. The movement through the center is illustrated by the figure. From the center, a rook and a bishop can reach any square on the board. A horse in the center can reach any square in the two inner rows (2 and 3). The rook is not allowed to do a "null move", i.e. to move 360° around the board back to the same square in one move.

The diplomat moves as a king, but can only move to unoccupied cells. The diplomat can not capture. Instead, it can suborn an enemy pieces on an adjacent cell, making them change sides. The enemy piece is replaced by the same kind of piece of the friendly color. The diplomat remains on the same cell when it suborns an enemy piece. The diplomat can suborn any enemy piece except the king.

In notation, suborn is represented by the destination cell, followed by the equal symbol (=) and then the colour the suborned piece changes to, alternatively only one letter: b for black and w for white. Example: b3=b for 'the piece on b3 becomes black'. (There is no need of writing the letter D for the diplomat).
