= Two knights endgame =

Chess endgame

The two knights endgame is a chess endgame with a king and two knights versus a king. In contrast to a king and two bishops (on opposite-colored squares), or a bishop and a knight, a king and two knights cannot force checkmate against a lone king (however, the superior side can force stalemate). Although there are checkmate positions, a king and two knights cannot force them against proper, relatively easy defense.

Position: b3 white king, c2 white knight, d2 white knight, a1 black king

Checkmate position, but it cannot be forced from the position with the c2 knight relocated to e2. The knight on d2 could be on c3 or a3 instead, and the white king could be on a3 instead.

Although the king and two knights cannot force checkmate of the lone king, there are positions in which the king and two knights can force checkmate against a king and some additional material. The extra material of the defending side provides moves that prevent the defending king from being stalemated or, less commonly, the extra material obstructs the defending king from escaping check. The winning chances with two knights are insignificant except against a few pawns. These positions were studied extensively by A. A. Troitsky, who discovered the Troitsky line, a line on or behind which the defending side's pawn must be securely blockaded for the attacking side to win.

If the side with the knights carelessly captures the other side's extra material, the game devolves to the basic two knights endgame, and the opportunity to force checkmate may be lost. When the defender has a single pawn, the technique (when it is possible) is to block the pawn with one knight, and use the king and the other knight to force the opposing king into a corner or nearby the blocking knight. Then, when the block on the pawn is removed, the knight that was used to block the pawn can be used to checkmate.

== Checkmate possibilities ==
In general, two knights cannot force checkmate, but they can force stalemate. Three knights can force checkmate, even if the defending king also has a knight or a bishop.

Edmar Mednis stated that this inability to force checkmate is "one of the great injustices of chess."

Unlike some other theoretically drawn endgames, such as a rook and bishop versus rook, the defender has an easy task in all endings with two knights versus a lone king. Players simply have to avoid moving into a position in which the king can be checkmated on the next move, and there is always another move available in such situations. In other words, there is no mate-in-2 position in this endgame.

=== Two knights ===
==== In the corner ====
Keres, diagram 7

Position: h8 black king, e6 white knight, g6 white king, f5 white knight

Two knights cannot force checkmate.

The player with the lone king has to make a blunder to be checkmated. In this position, 1.Ne7 or 1.Nh6 immediately stalemates Black. White can try instead:

1. Nf8 Kg8
2. Nd7 Kh8
3. Nd6 Kg8
4. Nf6+

and now if Black moves 4...Kh8?? then 5.Nf7# is checkmate, but if Black moves

4... Kf8!

then White has made no progress.

Berger

Position: g8 black king, d6 white knight, e6 white knight, g6 white king

Draw with either side to move

Johann Berger gave this position, a draw with either side to move. With White to move:

1. Nf5 Kh8
2. Ng5 Kg8
3. Ne7+ Kf8! (Black just avoids 3...Kh8? which leads to a checkmate on the next move with 4.Nf7#)
4. Kf6 Ke8

and White has made no progress. With Black to move:

1... Kh8
2. Nf7+ Kg8
3. Nh6+ Kh8
4. Ng5

gives stalemate.

==== On the edge ====
Position: c8 black king, f8 white king, c4 white knight, d4 white knight

White can also try for a mate on the edge of the board

There are also checkmate positions with the inferior side's king on the edge of the board (instead of the corner), but again they cannot be forced. In the position at right, White can try 1. Nb6+, hoping for 1...Kd8?? 2.Ne6#. Black can easily avoid this with, for example, 1... Kc7. This possible checkmate is the basis of some problems (see below).

==== Examples from games ====
Benko vs. Bronstein, 1949

Position: g4 white knight, g3 black knight, d2 white king, f2 black pawn, g2 black king

In this position from a 1949 game between Pal Benko and David Bronstein, Black underpromoted to a knight. Black did not promote to a queen or any other piece because White could fork Black's king and his newly promoted piece (e.g. 104...f1=Q 105.Ne3+) immediately after the promotion.

104...f1=N+
105. Kc3 Kf3.

White made the humorous move

106. Nh2+

forking Black's king and knight, but sacrificing the knight. Black responded

106... Nxh2

and a draw was agreed. (A draw by threefold repetition could have been claimed on move 78 and at other times.)

Karpov vs. Korchnoi, 1981

Position: c6 black king, f6 white knight, g6 black knight, h6 white pawn, f5 white knight, g5 black knight, d4 white king

Position after 80. Nf5

Another example is the eighth game of the 1981 World Chess Championship match between Anatoly Karpov and Viktor Korchnoi. Black forces a draw by

80... Nf7!
81. h7 Ng5!
82. Ne7+ Kb7
83. Nxg6 Nxh7
84. Nxh7 draw

=== Three knights ===
Three knights and a king can force checkmate against a lone king within twenty moves (unless the defending king can win one of the knights). Also, a complete computational retrograde analysis revealed that they can force checkmate only on the edge of the board.

== Two knights versus a pawn ==
In some positions with two knights versus a pawn, the knights can force checkmate by gaining a tempo when the pawn has to move, or having the pawn obstruct its king from escaping check.

=== Troitsky line ===
The Troitsky line

Position: b6 black circle, g6 black circle, c5 black circle, f5 black circle, a4 black circle, d4 black circle, e4 black circle, h4 black circle

Troitsky line positions when White has the two knights and Black the pawn

Position: a7 black circle, b7 black circle, c7 black circle, d7 black circle, e7 black circle, f7 black circle, g7 black circle, h7 black circle, a6 black circle, b6 black circle, c6 black circle, d6 black circle, e6 black circle, f6 black circle, g6 black circle, h6 black circle, a5 black circle, c5 black circle, d5 black circle, e5 black circle, f5 black circle, h5 black circle, a4 black circle, d4 black circle, e4 black circle, h4 black circle

All possible positions given by Troitsky line for the black pawn
Müller and Lamprecht 2001

Position: g6 black pawn, g5 white knight, h3 white knight

White wins no matter where the kings are.
Kling & Horwitz 1851.

Position: g3 white king, d2 white knight, f2 black pawn, f1 white knight, h1 black king

White to play and win.

1. Kh4 Kg2 2. Kg4 Kg1 3. Kh3 Kh1 4. Ng3+ Kg1 5. Nf3#

The pawn does not move; it assists mate by blocking the king's escape.

Even though two knights cannot force checkmate (with the help of their king) against a lone king (with the exception of positions where White wins in one move), decreasing the material advantage and allowing the defending king to have a pawn can actually allow for a forced checkmate. The reason that checkmate can be forced is that the pawn gives the defender a piece to move and deprives him of a stalemate defense. Another reason is that the pawn can block its own king's path without necessarily moving (e.g. Kling & Horwitz position right).

The Troitsky line (or Troitsky position) is a key motif in chess endgame theory in the rare but theoretically interesting ending of two knights versus a pawn.

The line, assuming White has the two knights and Black the pawn, is shown left.

The Russian theoretician Troitsky made a detailed study of this endgame and discovered the following rule:

If the pawn is securely blockaded by a white knight no further down than the line, then Black loses, no matter where the kings are.

— Karsten Müller and Frank Lamprecht, Fundamental Chess Endings 2001

An example of the application of this rule is given in the diagram Müller and Lamprecht right; "... the position would be lost no matter where the kings are."

However, the checkmate procedure is difficult and long. In fact, it can require up to 115 moves by White (assuming perfect play), so in competition a draw by the fifty-move rule will occur first.

Troitsky showed that "on any placement of the black king, White undoubtedly wins only against black pawns standing on [the Troitsky line] and above".

John Nunn analyzed the endgame of two knights versus a pawn with an endgame tablebase and stated that "the analysis of Troitsky and others is astonishingly accurate". He undertook this checking after the very ending occurred in a critical variation of his post mortem analysis of a game he lost to Korchnoi in the 1980 Phillips and Drew Tournament in London. Neither player knew whether the position was a win for the player with the knights (Korchnoi).

Even when the position is a theoretical win, it is very complicated and difficult to play correctly. Even grandmasters fail to win it. Andor Lilienthal failed to win it twice in a six-year period, see Norman vs. Lilienthal and Smyslov vs. Lilienthal. But a fine win is in a game by Seitz, see Znosko-Borovsky vs. Seitz.

==== Examples ====
Position: f7 white king, h7 black king, f5 white knight, d3 black pawn, d2 white knight

White to move wins.

This diagram shows an example of how having the pawn makes things worse for Black (here Black's pawn is past the Troitsky line), by making Black have a move available instead of being stalemated.

1. Ne4 d2
2. Nf6+ Kh8
3. Ne7 (if Black did not have the pawn at this point, the game would be a draw because of stalemate)
3... d1=Q
4. Ng6#

If Black did not have the pawn move available, White could not force checkmate.

Position: a7 black king, e5 white king, f5 black knight, a3 white pawn, b1 black knight

Black to move wins in 115 moves.

The longest wins require 115 moves; this is one example starting with 1... Ne7.

Position: h7 black knight, e5 white pawn, h3 white king, h2 black knight, h1 black king

Black to move wins in 86 moves.

This position is winnable, but the white pawn can be allowed to move only after 84 moves, making the win impossible under the fifty-move rule.

==== Pawn beyond the Troitsky line ====
Chéron, 1955

Position: c4 white knight, g3 black pawn, a2 black king, c2 white king, g2 white knight

White wins with either side to move.

In this study by André Chéron, White wins even though the pawn is well beyond the Troitsky line.

Black to move is quicker. With White to move, he must maneuver to give the move to Black, as follows. 1.Kc3 Kb1 2.Kd2 Ka1 3.Kc1 Ka2 4.Kc2 (White then maneuvers to get the same position with vertical instead of horizontal opposition) 4...Ka1 5.Kb3 Kb1 6.Nb2 Kc1 7.Kc3 Kb1 8.Nd3 Ka1 9.Kc4 Ka2 10.Kb4 Ka1 11.Ka3 Kb1 12.Kb3 (Now White has enough time to bring the blockading N in to generate a mating net in time) 12...Ka1 13.Ne3 g2 14.Nc2+ Kb1 15.Na3+ Ka1 16.Nb4 g1=Q 17.Nbc2#

Averbakh & Chekhover, position #251

Position: a8 black cross, b8 black cross, c8 black cross, d8 black cross, a7 black cross, b7 black cross, c7 black cross, d7 black cross, e7 black cross, a6 black cross, b6 black cross, c6 black cross, d6 white knight, e6 black cross, f6 black cross, g6 black king, b5 black cross, c5 black cross, d5 black cross, e5 white king, f5 black cross, c4 black cross, d4 black cross, e4 black cross, f4 black cross, h3 black pawn, h2 white knight

Drawing area marked with "×"

White to play draws. Black to play loses.

In the situation with Black's rook pawn blockaded on h3, if the black king can enter and remain in the area marked with crosses in the adjacent diagram, the game is a draw. Otherwise, White can force the black king into one of the corners not located in the drawing zone and deliver checkmate. Black cannot be checkmated in the a8-corner because the knight on h2 is too far away to help deliver mate: Black draws by pushing the pawn as soon as White moves the knight on h2. White to play in the diagram can try to prevent Black to enter the drawing zone with 1.Ke6, but Black then plays 1...Kg5 aiming to attack the knight on h2. White is compelled to stop this with 2.Ke5 which allows Black to return to the initial position with 2...Kg6, and White has made no progress.

==== Topalov versus Karpov ====
Topalov vs. Karpov, 2000

Position: g4 black pawn, b3 white king, d3 white knight, e2 white knight, b1 black king

White won after 74. Ne2, even though the pawn was past the Troitsky line.

Anatoly Karpov lost an endgame with a pawn versus two knights to Veselin Topalov although he had a theoretical draw with a pawn past the Troitsky line; because of its rarity, Karpov seemed not to know the theory of drawing and headed for the wrong corner. (Depending on the position of the pawn, checkmate can be forced only in certain corners.) In this "rapid play" time control, the position in the game was initially a draw, but Karpov made a bad move which resulted in a lost position. Topalov later made a bad move, making the position a draw, but Karpov made another bad move, resulting in a lost position again.

==== Wang versus Anand ====
Wang vs. Anand, 2009

Position: c6 black king, a5 white king, c3 white pawn, f3 black knight, g3 black knight

Position after 61. Kxa5

This position from a blindfold game between Wang Yue and Viswanathan Anand leads to an example with a forced win even though the pawn is past the Troitsky line. The game continued

61... Kc5,

blocking the pawn with the wrong piece. Black should have played 61...Ne4 62. c4 Nc5!, blocking the pawn on the Troitsky line with a knight, with a forced win. The game continued:

62. c4 Ne4
63. Ka4 Nd4
64. Ka5.

Black still has a theoretical forced win in this position, even after letting the pawn advance past the Troitsky line:

64... Nc6+
65. Ka6 Kd6!!
66. c5+ Kc7

and Black has a forced checkmate in 58 more moves. However, the actual game was drawn.

== More pawns ==
Fine & Benko, diagram 201

Position: c5 black king, d5 black pawn, e5 black pawn, b2 white king, d2 white knight, e2 white knight

White to move wins in 96 moves.
Fine, ECE #1778

Position: c6 black pawn, d6 black pawn, e6 black pawn, f6 black king, c3 white knight, e3 white king, f3 white knight

White to move wins in 87 moves.
Lomonosov Tablebases

Position: e6 black king, g4 black knight, b2 white pawn, c2 white pawn, h2 white pawn, b1 white king, h1 black knight

Black to move wins in 146 moves.

Two knights can win in some cases when the defender has more than one pawn. First the knights should blockade the pawns and then capture all except one. The knights cannot set up an effective blockade against four connected pawns, so the position generally results in a draw. Five or more pawns usually win against two knights.

=== Example from game ===
Motwani vs. I. Gurevich

Position: e6 black king, c5 white king, d5 black knight, e5 white pawn, f5 black knight, d4 white pawn

Position after Black's 72nd move

In this 1991 game between Paul Motwani and Ilya Gurevich, Black has blockaded the white pawns. In ten moves, Black won the pawn on d4. There were some inaccuracies on both sides, but White resigned on move 99.

== Position of mutual zugzwang ==
Troitsky

Position: h8 black king, f7 white king, f5 white knight, d3 black pawn, d2 white knight

White to move draws; Black to move loses.

There are positions of mutual zugzwang in the endgame with two knights versus one pawn. In this position, White to move draws but Black to move loses. With Black to move:

1... Kh7
2. Ne4 d2
3. Nf6+ Kh8
4. Ne7 (or 4.Nh4) d1=Q
5. Ng6#

With White to move, Black draws with correct play. White cannot put Black in zugzwang:

1. Kf6 Kh7
2. Kf7 Kh8
3. Kg6 Kg8
4. Ng7 Kf8
5. Kf6 Kg8
6. Ne6 Kh7! (but not 6...Kh8? because White wins after 7.Kg6!, which puts Black to move)
7. Kg5 Kg8
8. Kg6 Kh8

and White has no way to force a win.

== Checkmate in problems ==
The possible checkmate on the edge of the board is the basis of some composed chess problems, as well as variations of the checkmate with two knights against a pawn.

Angos, 2005

Angos, 2005

Position: d8 white knight, g8 black king, b7 black knight, d7 white knight, g6 white king

White to move and mate in four

In this problem by Alex Angos, White checkmates in four moves:

1. Ne6! Nd8
2. Nf6+ Kh8
3. Ng5 N–any (Black is in zugzwang and any knight move must abandon the protection of the f7-square)
4. Nf7#

Berger, 1890

Berger, 1890

Position: e8 black knight, g8 black king, d6 white knight, e6 white knight, g6 white king

White to move and mate in four

A similar problem was composed by Johann Berger in 1890. The solution is:

1. Nf7! Nd6
2. Nh6+ Kh8
3. Ng5

followed by

4. Ngf7#.

de Musset, 1849

Alfred de Musset, 1849

Position: b8 black knight, e8 black king, g8 white king, h7 white rook, e5 white knight, g4 white knight

White to move and mate in three

In this composition by Alfred de Musset, White checkmates on the edge of the board in three moves with:

1. Rd7 Nxd7
2. Nc6 N–any
3. Nf6#.

Sobolevsky, 1951

P. Sobolevsky, Shakhmaty v SSSR, 1951

Position: f7 black king, h7 white knight, f6 white bishop, g6 white knight, h3 white king, g2 black knight, h2 black bishop

White to move and win

In this study composed by Sobolevsky, White wins by checkmating with two knights:

1. Nh8+ Kg8
2. Kxg2 Bf4
3. Ng6 Bh6!
4. Ng5 Bg7!
5. Ne7+ Kh8
6. Nf7+ Kh7
7. Bh4! Bf6!
8. Ng5+ Kh6
9. Ng8+ Kh5
10. Nxf6+! Kxh4
11. Nf3#

Nadanian, 2009

Ashot Nadanian, ChessBase, 2009

Position: h8 white rook, d7 black knight, g7 black rook, d6 white knight, g6 black knight, h6 black pawn, g5 black king, h5 white pawn, d4 white knight, f4 black pawn, h3 white king

White to move and win

In this study composed by Ashot Nadanian, White wins by checkmating with two knights:

1. Rg8!! Rxg8

If 1...Re7, then 2.N6f5! Re1 3.Rxg6+ Kxh5 4.Rxh6+ Kg5 5.Nf3+ and White wins.

2. Ne4+ Kxh5
3. Ne6

and checkmate on the next move, due to zugzwang; two white knights deliver four different checkmates:

- 3... R–any 4. Ng7#
- 3... Nd–any 4. Nf6#
- 3... Ng–any 4. Nf4#
- 3... f3 4. Ng3#

== History ==
The first known composition where two knights win against one pawn is, according to Lafora, by Gioachino Greco in 1620. In 1780, Chapais did a partial analysis of three positions with the pawn on f4 or h4. In 1851 Horwitz and Kling published three positions where the knights win against one pawn and two positions where they win against two pawns. The analysis by Chapais was revised by Guretsky-Cornitz and others, and it was included by Johann Berger in Theory and Practice of the Endgame, first published in 1891. However, the analysis by Guretsky-Cornitz was incorrect, and the original analysis by Chapais was, in principle, correct. Troitsky started studying the endgame in the early 20th century and published his extensive analysis in 1937. Modern computer analysis found it to be very accurate.

Master games with this ending are rare — Troitsky knew of only six when he published his analysis in 1937. In the first four (from c. 1890 to 1913), the weaker side brought about the ending to obtain a draw from an opponent who did not know how to win. The first master game with a win was in 1931 when Adolf Seitz beat Eugene Znosko-Borovsky.

Horwitz & Kling, 1851

Position: d4 black pawn, b3 white king, d3 white knight, b1 black king, g1 white knight

White to move checkmates in six moves: 1.Ne2 Ka1 2.Nb4 Kb1 (2...d3 3.Nc3 d2 4.Nc2#) 3.Nc2 d3 4.Na3+ Ka1 5.Nc3 d2 6.Nc2#
Horwitz & Kling, 1851

Position: g6 white knight, f5 white knight, h3 black pawn, e2 white king, g2 black king, h2 black pawn

White to move wins by setting up Stamma's mate: 1.Ngh4+ Kg1 2.Nf3+ Kh1 3.Ke1 Kg2 4.Nxh2!! Kxh2 5.Kf1! Kh1 6.Kf2 Kh2 7.Ne3 Kh1 8.Nf1 h2 9.Ng3# 1-0
Pollock vs. Showalter, c. 1890

Position: a7 black pawn, a5 white knight, c4 white knight, g4 black king, f2 white king

White to move. Pollock refused to continue and agreed to a draw six moves later, but White has a winning position.
