= Rook and bishop versus rook endgame =

Chess endgame of rook & bishop versus rook

The rook and bishop versus rook endgame is a chess endgame where one player has just a king, a rook, and a bishop, and the other player has just a king and a rook. This combination of material is one of the most common pawnless chess endgames. It is generally a theoretical draw, but the rook and bishop have good winning chances in practice because the defense is difficult. Ulf Andersson won the position twice within a year, once against a grandmaster and once against a candidate master; and grandmaster Keith Arkell has been reported as winning it 27 times out of 27 attempts. In positions that have a forced win, up to 59 moves are required. Tony Kosten has seen the endgame many times in master games, with the stronger side almost always winning. Pal Benko called this the "headache ending." David Howell observed, "Especially below elite grandmaster level, this is one of the hardest endgames to draw."

Being a five-piece endgame, the rook and bishop versus rook endgame has been fully analysed using computers. Endgame tablebases show that 40.1% of the legal positions with this material are theoretical wins, but that includes many unnatural positions that are unlikely to occur in games. Edmar Mednis estimated that less than 4% of starting positions that occur in games are theoretical wins.

== History ==
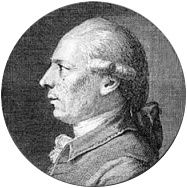
Philidor

In 1749 François-André Danican Philidor (1726–1795) published a position in which the superior side can force a win. Giambattista Lolli (1698–1769) studied a similar position with a forced win. On the other hand, there are several drawing techniques possible if a winning position such as the Philidor position has not been reached. The Cochrane Defense was discovered by John Cochrane (1798–1878), the Szén position was discovered by József Szén (1805–1857), and there is the second-rank defense. Other winning and drawing positions were studied by Adolf Zytogorski, Tassilo von Heydebrand und der Lasa, Josef Kling and Kuiper, and André Chéron.

Many of the longest chess games on record involve this endgame since at one time the fifty-move rule under which a draw could be claimed after fifty moves with no capture was extended to one-hundred moves for this combination of material. For example, the longest tournament game on record is a 269-move game by Ivan Nikolić and International Master Goran Arsović. The last 103 moves had this material and the game ended in a draw.

Anatoly Karpov played a rook versus rook and bishop ending in a 2003 game with 15-year-old Teimour Radjabov, which went 113 moves before an indignant Karpov claimed a draw by invoking the 50-move rule with only 14 seconds remaining on the game clock.

== Winning positions ==
=== Philidor position ===
This famous position was studied by and named after François-André Danican Philidor. White wins because his king has reached the sixth rank and the black king is poorly placed (opposite the white king). If this type of position arises, it is usually because of inferior defense. Nevertheless, it is tricky to win.

Philidor, 1749

Position: d8 black king, e7 black rook, d6 white king, d5 white bishop, f1 white rook

White to move wins

First to be noted is that the trivial

1.Bc6

does not work because of

1...Rd7+! 2.Bxd7

which is stalemate (draw). Alternatively, if the bishop does not take the rook, then the white king has to move and White loses the advantageous position.

The winning method is as follows:

1.Rf8+! Re8 2.Rf7!

Threatening to switch the rook to the other side and checkmate.

2...Re2

This is the best place for the black rook. Alternatives are:

- 2...Re3 3.Rd7+ Ke8 4.Ra7 Kf8 5.Rf7+ Ke8 6.Rf4 Kd8 7.Be4 a sequence which mirrors the main line from move 8;
- 2...Re1 and White wins similarly to the main line;
- 2...Kc8 3.Ra7 Rd8+ 4.Kc6 Kb8 5.Rb7+ Ka8 6.Rb1 Ka7 7.Kc7 and White wins.

3.Rh7 Re1

This idle move is necessary because the black rook must remain on the e-file, so it is forced to its next best position on e1. White will take advantage of this on move 5.

4.Rb7

The winning line only works if the white rook is on b7 or f7.

4...Rc1

Or 4...Kc8 5.Ra7 Rb1 6.Rf7 Kb8 7.Rf8+ Ka7 8.Ra8+ Kb6 (White wins because the chessboard has only eight files) 9.Rb8+.

5.Bb3

This is the key idea. It forces the black rook to the inferior third rank while preventing 5...Rd1+. Black is in zugzwang.

5... Rc3

If instead 5...Kc8, then 6.Rb4 Kd8 7.Rf4 Re1 (or 7...Kc8 8.Bd5 Kb8 9.Ra4) 8.Ba4 Kc8 9. Rb4. Now White completes the following maneuvers, getting the bishop back to d5 with gain of tempo.

6.Be6 Rd3+ 7.Bd5! Rc3 8.Rd7+ Kc8

If 8...Ke8, then 9.Rg7 and checkmate on g8 next move, else loss of the rook since the bishop covers f3.

9.Rh7 Kb8 10.Rb7+ Kc8 11.Rb4!

Position after 11. Rb4!

Position: c8 black king, d6 white king, d5 white bishop, b4 white rook, c3 black rook

Black to move, White wins

This is the position White was seeking; White threatens 12.Be6+ Kd8 13.Rb8+ Rc8 14.Rxc8#.

If 11...Rd3 12.Ra4 and the black rook cannot prevent Ra8# because b3 is covered by the bishop.

11...Kd8 12. Bc4

Stopping the check on d3 and cutting off the rook entirely. Now mate is unavoidable either by Rb8# or via Be6+ after Kc8.

This is an exercise in domination of the black rook. This method works if the kings are on the central four ranks or files. It does not work if the kings are on the rank or file next to the edge – those positions are a theoretical draw, but difficult to defend. If the kings are on a rank or file on the edge of the board the position is a win, but by a different method.

=== Lolli position ===
Lolli position, 1763

Position: b8 black rook, c4 white bishop, c3 white king, g2 white rook, c1 black king

Black to move, White wins

This winning position was discovered by Giambattista Lolli. The position is one rank or file closer to the edge of the board than the Philidor position, so the winning method is slightly different. Switching the attacking rook to the other side of the king is no longer dangerous.

The method:

1... Rd8 2. Ra2 Rb8 3. Ba6 Rb6 4. Bd3 Rc6+ 5. Bc4 Rb6 6. Rc2+ Kb1 7. Re2 Ka1 8. Re5 Rb7

Or 8...Rb8.

9. Ra5+ Kb1 10. Bd3+ Kc1 11. Ra1+ Rb1 12. Rxb1#.

== Drawing defenses ==
=== Cochrane Defense ===
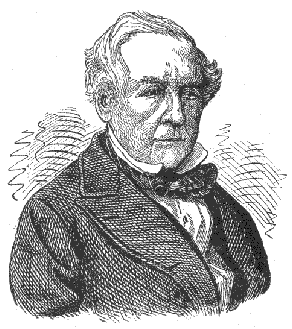
John Cochrane

The Cochrane Defense is a drawing method discovered by John Cochrane. The Cochrane Defense is the most popular among grandmasters for this endgame. The basic idea is to pin the bishop to its king when there are at least two ranks or files between the kings.

Accurate play is required for the defense. The defense is most effective near the center of the board, and does not work on the edge. The Cochrane Defense works when:

- the defending rook pins the bishop to the king on one of the four central files (c through f) or ranks (3 through 6); and
- there are two or more ranks or files (respectively) between the kings.

The Cochrane defense can also be used with a rook against a rook and knight.

==== Budnikov versus Novik ====
Budnikov vs. Novik

Position: e8 black king, a7 white rook, e5 white king, e4 white bishop, e2 black rook

Cochrane defense. Draw with either side to move.

The defense is most effective near the center of the board. In this position, if the pieces on the e-file were moved to the f-file, then if 1.Ke5, the response 1...Kg8 puts the black king dangerously close to the corner.

In this position from a 1991 game between Alexandar Budnikov and Maxim Novik, White would like to get his king to d6 and bishop to d5, to win by a method of Philidor (see Philidor position); however, the pin of the bishop to the king prevents it. If White plays 1.Kd5 or 1.Kf5 then Black moves his king in the opposite direction, so if the bishop then moves, the black rook cuts off the white king.

There are some key ideas for the defender to observe:

- Wait by moving the rook between e1 and e2.
- Answer Kd5 with ...Kf8, and Kf5 by ...Kd8.
- Drive the rook away from the seventh rank at the first opportunity.
- Move the king away from the eighth rank, as near the center of the board as possible.
- Once the king has left the back rank, hold off the attacking king for a few moves.
- When the white king gets back to the fifth rank (or equivalent in other directions), switch the rook around and head for the Cochrane position again (perhaps rotated 90 or 180 degrees). This phase is important because the opposing king must not be allowed to reach the sixth rank (or equivalent).

The game continued:

1... Re1 2. Kd5 Kf8! 3. Bf5 Re7! 4. Ra8+ Kf7 5. Ra1 Kf6 6. Bc8 Re5+ 7. Kd6 Re2 8. Rf1+ Kg5 9. Bb7 Re3 10. Kd5 Re2 11. Kd4 Re7 12. Bd5 Re8 13. Rf7 Rb8 14. Ke5 Rb5

and the position is back to the basic Cochrane position, rotated 90 degrees, and the fifty-move rule is closer to coming into effect. The Budnikov versus Novik game continued, with the Cochrane position being reached again. Eventually a draw was claimed by the fifty-move rule.

==== Ljubojević versus Portisch ====
Ljubojević vs. Portisch

Position: e8 black king, h7 white rook, e5 white king, e4 white bishop, e1 black rook

Position after 97...Ke8!

The Cochrane Defense was also used in this 1982 game between Ljubomir Ljubojević and Lajos Portisch. The Cochrane position occurred again on move 114, rotated 90 degrees. The game was drawn on move 127.

98. Kd5 Kf8!

The defending king goes the opposite way as the attacking king.

99. Ra7 Re3 100. Bf5 Re7 101. Ra1 Re2 102. Be6 Ke7 103. Ra7+ Kf6 104. Rf7+ Kg5 105. Kd6 Re1 106. Rf3 Ra1 107. Bc4 Re1 108. Kd5 Rd1+ 109. Ke4 Re1+ 110. Kd4 Rd1+ 111. Bd3 Ra1 112. Be4 Ra4+ 113. Ke5 Ra5+ 114. Bd5 Kg4 115. Rf2 Kg5 116. Rb2 Kg4 117. Rg2+ Kh5 118. Rg1

Cochrane position again, on a different side.

118... Rb5 119. Ke4 Kh6 120. Be6 Ra5 121. Bg4 Kg7 122. Kf4 Ra3 123. Bf5+ Kf8 124. Kg5 Ke7 125. Rd1 Ra7 126. Rd5 Rc7 127. Bh3 Ra7 draw.

=== Second-rank defense ===
The "second-rank defense" is a passive defense with the defending king and rook on a rank or file one over from the edge of the board (e.g. the second or seventh rank or the b- or g-file). The method is reliable but it is possible to go wrong, especially if the defending king is near the corner.

==== Norri versus Atalık ====
Norri vs. Atalık

Position: b5 black rook, d4 black bishop, e4 black king, c2 white rook, e2 white king

White to move

This 1997 game between Joose Norri and Suat Atalık illustrates the second-rank defense. White cannot reach the Cochrane Defense. Attempting to get the rook behind the black king would get to a lost Philidor position: 87.Rc8? Rb2+ 88.Kf1 Rf2+ 89.Ke1 Kd3. White uses the second-rank defense. White alternates his rook between c2 and d2 until Black tries to penetrate.

87. Rd2 Rh5 88. Rc2 Rh2+ 89. Kd1

The defending king can be driven to the edge of the board but then the attacker's rook is under attack, so the king cannot approach.

89... Rh1+ 90. Ke2 Rh2+ 91. Kd1 Rh3 92. Ke2 Bc3

This is another attempt by Black. It seems that White is in zugzwang and any rook move loses (93.Rc1 Rh2+ 94.Kd1 Kd3), but White has a good move.

93. Kd1!

Now if 93...Kd3 White has a stalemate defense with 94.Rd2+ so the black king has to back off.

93... Rh1+ 94. Ke2

and the game was drawn on move 98.

==== Carlsen versus Van Wely ====
Carlsen vs. Van Wely

Position: h6 black rook, d4 black bishop, e4 black king, c2 white rook, e2 white king

White to move

The second-rank defense was used by 16-year-old Magnus Carlsen in this 2007 game against Loek van Wely.

64. Rd2 Rh3 65. Rc2 Bc3

It is hard to drive the defending king to the edge. After 65...Rh2+ 66.Kd1 the black rook must move and the white king goes back to e2.

66. Kd1

White was in zugzwang and had to temporarily leave the second rank.

66... Kd4

Here 66...Kd3 is met by 67.Rd2+.

67. Rf2 Kd3 68. Rd2+ Kc4 69. Rf2 Re3 70. Re2 Rd3+ 71. Kc2

and the king is back to the second rank. The game continued and the position on move 74 was a reflection of the position on move 66. On move 80 the same defense was set up on the b-file. Black could make no progress and the game was drawn after 109 moves.

=== Szén position ===
Szén position

Position: c7 white rook, b5 black rook, e4 black bishop, e3 black king, d1 white king

Black to move, draw

József Szén discovered a defensive drawing position, known as the Szén position. The kings are opposite in an L-shape and the weaker side's rook defends on the side of his king that has more room. Szén's position is the most important for over-the-board players. Compared to the Philidor position, the kings are not opposite each other and the defending rook can prevent checkmate. The position is a draw only if there is enough room for the defending king on the side with the rooks.

An example of this defense being used in a game is this 1982 one between József Pintér and Yuri Razuvayev. After 88 moves, the position had a rook and bishop versus a rook. The diagram shows the position after 101. Kd1!, reaching the Szén position. On the 132nd move, White reached a Szén position for the fourth time. The game was drawn on the 138th move.

=== Second Lolli position ===
Second Lolli position, 1793

Position: b8 black king, c7 black rook, b6 white king, b5 white bishop, d2 white rook

White to move, draw

In the second Lolli position, the kings are one row closer to the edge than in the first Lolli position. Unlike the Philidor position and the first Lolli position, this position is a theoretical draw. Several of the moves in the perfect defence are the only move that saves the game.

== See also ==
- Chess endgame
- List of world records in chess § Longest game
- Pawnless chess endgame § Common pawnless endings (rook and minor pieces)
