= Fifty-move rule =

Chess rule for claiming a draw

The fifty-move rule in chess states that a player can claim a draw if no capture has been made and no pawn has been moved in the last fifty moves (where a "move" consists of a player completing a turn followed by the opponent completing a turn). The purpose of this rule is to prevent a player with no chance of winning from obstinately continuing to play indefinitely or seeking to win by tiring the opponent.

Chess positions with only a few pieces can be "solved", that is, the outcome of best play for both sides can be determined by exhaustive analysis; if the outcome is a win for one side or the other (rather than a draw), it is of interest to know whether the defending side can hold out long enough to invoke the fifty-move rule. The simplest common endings, called the basic checkmates, such as king and queen versus king, can all be won in well under 50 moves. However, in the 20th century it was discovered that certain endgame positions are winnable but require more than 50 moves (without a capture or a pawn move). The rule was therefore changed to allow certain exceptions in which 100 moves were allowed with particular material combinations. Winnable positions that required even more moves were later discovered, however, and in 1992, FIDE abolished all such exceptions and reinstated the strict 50-move rule over the board. In correspondence chess, a rule that resembles these endgame exceptions is in effect. Players can claim a win or draw using seven-piece endgame tablebases; however, under ICCF rules, these tablebases do not take the 50-move rule into account.

== Statement of rule ==
The relevant part of the FIDE laws of chess is quoted below: (Note: Rule 9.3 in FIDE Laws of Chess)

9.3 The game is drawn, upon a correct claim by a player having the move, if:

- 9.3.1 he writes his move, which cannot be changed, on his scoresheet and declares to the arbiter his intention to make this move, which will result in the last 50 moves by each player having been made without the movement of any pawn and without any capture, or
- 9.3.2 the last 50 moves by each player have been completed without the movement of any pawn and without any capture.

A claim does not have to be made at the first opportunity; it can be made any time when there have been no captures or pawn moves in the last fifty moves.

A game is not automatically declared a draw under the fifty-move rule; the draw must be claimed by the player whose turn it is to move. Therefore, a game can continue beyond a point where a draw could be claimed under the rule. When a draw under the fifty-move rule can be claimed, one of the players is usually happy to claim it.

Games drawn under the fifty-move rule before the endgame are rare. One example was the game Filipowicz versus Smederevac, Polanica Zdrój 1966, where no captures had been made in the whole game. Filipowicz claimed the draw after move 70 by Smederevac, the last pawn having been moved on move 20 by Smederevac.

In correspondence chess under ICCF rules, the fifty-move rule only applies when more than seven pieces remain on the board; when seven pieces or fewer remain, a win or draw may be claimed with reference to endgame tablebases. Some older tablebases do not consider the 50- or 75-move rules, so a position that is a theoretical win according to the tablebases may be a draw in over-the-board chess. Such a position is sometimes termed a "cursed win" (where mate can be forced, but it runs afoul of the 50-move rule), or a "blessed loss" from the perspective of the other player.

In retrograde analysis problems, castling also resets the fifty-move rule counter.

=== Seventy-five-move rule ===
If seventy-five moves are made without a pawn move or capture being made, the game is drawn unless the seventy-fifth move delivers a checkmate. No claim needs to be made by either player, as the draw is mandatorily applied by the arbiter. (Note: Article 9.6.2 in Fide Laws of Chess)

9.6 If one or both of the following occur(s) then the game is drawn:

- ...
- 9.6.2 any series of at least 75 moves have been made by each player without the movement of any pawn and without any capture. If the last move resulted in checkmate, that shall take precedence.

== Examples ==
=== Timman vs. Lutz, 1995 ===
Position: e6 black king, b5 white king, c5 white bishop, h4 black rook, g3 white rook

Position after 69.Rxg3, start of 50-move count

Position: h7 black king, f5 white king, g5 white rook, b4 black rook, f4 white bishop

Position before 121...Rb5+, draw claimed

In this 1995 game between Jan Timman and Christopher Lutz, an endgame with a rook and bishop versus a rook occurred. White is striving for the winning Philidor position while Black is employing the drawing Cochrane Defense and the "second-rank defense" (see rook and bishop versus rook endgame). Black was defending well in the difficult defense and could have claimed a draw on the 119th move. Lutz notes that he claimed a draw on move 121, ironically making a move that entered what would have been a losing position.

=== Karpov vs. Kasparov, 1991 ===
Position: d8 black rook, c6 white bishop, f6 black king, f4 white knight, h4 white king, d3 white knight

Position after 63.Kxh4, the last capture

Position: h8 black king, e7 white knight, e6 white knight, f6 white king, f5 white bishop, a1 black rook

Position after 112...Kh8

A draw by the fifty-move rule could have been claimed after Black's 112th move in a 1991 game between Anatoly Karpov and Garry Kasparov, but neither player claimed it. The last capture occurred on White's 63rd move (and the last pawn move occurred before that). White could have written his 113th move (which wouldn't have been a capture or pawn move) on his scoresheet and claimed a draw. (Note: Rule 9.3.1 in FIDE Laws of Chess) After White's 113th move, either player could have claimed a draw on his turn to move, without having to write down his next move. (Note: Rule 9.3.2 in FIDE Laws of Chess) Instead, the game continued for several more moves:

- 113. Ng5 Ra6+
- 114. Kf7 Rf6+
- ½-½

The players agreed to a draw at this point because after 115.Kxf6 the position is a stalemate. If 115.Ke8, then 115...Rxf5 116.Nxf5, and the position is clearly drawn because the two knights cannot force checkmate (see two knights endgame).

=== Lputian vs. Haroutjunian, 2001 ===
Position: g8 black king, e6 black queen, h6 white pawn, g5 white pawn, d4 white queen, g2 white king

Position after 86.h6 (the last pawn move of the game)

Position: h8 black king, f7 black queen, f6 white queen, h6 white pawn, g5 white pawn, g3 white king

Position after 142.Qf6+, where Black could claim a draw but resigned

An unusual event occurred in a game in the 2001 Armenian Championship between Smbat Lputian (who won the championship) and Gevorg Haroutjunian. The last pawn move was on White's 86th move and no captures occurred after it. (The game was a theoretical draw from before here until Black's 141st move.) Black could have claimed a draw after White's 136th move (or at any of the subsequent moves). Instead, the game continued and Black resigned on his 142nd move after White had achieved a forced winning position even though the right to claim a draw was still in effect.

=== Nguyễn vs. Vachier-Lagrave, 2008 ===
Position: e8 black king, b7 white rook, f5 white king, h4 white bishop, a2 black rook

Position after 71.Bxh4 (the last capture of the game)

Position: e8 white rook, a7 black king, b7 black rook, c6 white king, c5 white bishop

Position after 121.Bc5+, where White can mate in two moves but Black claimed a draw by the fifty-move rule

Another unusual event occurred in the Aeroflot Open of 2008 in a game between Nguyễn Ngọc Trường Sơn and Maxime Vachier-Lagrave. The last capture was on White's 71st move, creating a rook and bishop versus rook endgame. The game was a theoretical draw until Black blundered on his 113th move. White managed to find the win, but could not secure checkmate or the win of the black rook before the fifty-move rule came into effect, and Black claimed a draw.

=== Nakamura vs. Donchenko, 2024 ===
Position: e7 black king, c4 black rook, a2 white rook, f2 white king, a1 white bishop

Position after 78.Rxa2, start of 50-move count

Position: h5 white rook, c4 black rook, f3 white king, h3 black king, f2 white bishop

Position before 128...Rh4, draw claimed

During the opening day of the World Rapid Chess Championship 2024, Alexander Donchenko successfully claimed an unexpected fifty-move-rule draw against Hikaru Nakamura, despite Nakamura being one move away from delivering checkmate to Donchenko. Nakamura's 128th move trapped Donchenko's king in white's kingside and under check by the white rook. Black's only legal move was to block the check with his own rook with 128...Rh4, after which white would win by checkmate with 129.Rxh4#. Instead of facing certain checkmate, Donchenko summoned an arbiter to claim a fifty-move draw, which was granted after the arbiter verified that it had been exactly fifty moves since the last capture or pawn move on move 78.

== History ==
The rule has a long history. The purpose of the rule is to prevent someone from playing on indefinitely in a position that cannot be won. A precursor to chess, shatranj, had a seventy-move rule. The fifty-move rule was introduced into chess by Ruy López in his 1561 book. Pietro Carrera (1573–1647) thought that twenty-four moves was the right number but Bourdonnais (1795–1840) argued for sixty moves.

By 1800, a claim under the rule could be made only in certain specified types of endgame, which varied from one set of rules to another. The move-count started when the request to implement the rule was made (instead of going back to the last capture or pawn move) and a capture or a pawn move did not reset the count. The rules used at the 1883 London tournament reset the count if there was a capture or pawn move, but still started the count when the claim to apply the rule was made instead of going back to the last capture or pawn move.

At one time, it was believed that all winnable endgames could be won within fifty moves. However, in the early 20th century, some exceptions were found, including A. A. Troitsky's (1866–1942) analysis of the two knights endgame as well as the endgame of a rook and bishop versus a rook. The rules of chess were revised several times to admit exceptions to the fifty-move rule for certain specific situations. Early on, the fifty-move rule applied to tournament games but not to match games.

During the time periods when the fifty-move rule admitted exceptions, there were a number of revisions. In 1928 FIDE enacted rules that if an endgame theoretically requires more than 50 moves to force checkmate, twice that number of moves were allowed. For instance, in the rook and bishop versus rook endgame, 132 moves were allowed, since it was twice the 66 moves that were thought to be required at that time. (The actual maximum number of moves needed is 59.) In 1952 FIDE revised the law, allowing for 100 moves in such positions but requiring that players agree to an extension for these positions before the first move is made. This was still in effect in 1960. The positions were not specified in the rules, to allow for the possibility of more positions requiring more than 50 moves to be discovered (which is what happened). The following positions were understood to require more than 50 moves:

1. rook and bishop versus a rook
2. two knights versus a pawn safely blocked by a knight behind the Troitsky line
3. rook and pawn on a2 versus a bishop on black squares and a pawn on a3, plus the equivalent positions in the other corners. (In 1979 it was shown that this endgame can actually be won in just under 50 moves.)

Article 12.4 of the 1965 FIDE rules states:

The number of moves can be increased for certain positions, provided that this increase in number and these positions have been clearly established before the commencement of the game.

Harkness notes that "Some of these unusual positions have been established and accepted by FIDE", including two knights versus a pawn. The 1975 and 1977 versions of the rules included the same wording (not specifying the positions or the number of moves).

In 1984, the rule was modified and it became Article 10.9. Now 100 moves were explicitly specified and the positions above were listed in the rule. (The wording about the positions and number of moves having to be specified in advance of the game was dropped.) Ken Thompson's investigations in the 1980s using the Belle chess computer discovered numerous endgames winnable in more than 50 moves. However, these often involved seemingly random moves that defied human comprehension or analysis, in situations that would hardly ever occur in real gameplay. In 1989 the rule (still Article 10.9) was changed to 75 moves, and the listed positions were:

1. Rook and bishop versus rook
2. Two knights versus a pawn (no mention of the Troitsky line)
3. A queen and a pawn on the seventh rank versus a queen (see queen and pawn versus queen endgame)
4. Queen versus two knights (see pawnless chess endgame § Queen versus two minor pieces)
5. Queen versus two bishops
6. Two bishops versus a knight (see pawnless chess endgame § Minor pieces only).

The rule was then changed to allow just 50 moves in all positions. Some sources say that the 1989 rule was in effect for only a "year or so" or a "few years", but one source of the 1992 rules gives the pre-1984 wording: "increased for certain positions if it was announced in advance". By 2001 the rule was Article 9.3 and allowed 50 moves for all positions.

Research into how many moves are required to win certain endgames continued. Exhaustive retrograde analysis using faster computers to build endgame tablebases has uncovered many more such endgames, often of previously unsuspected length. In 2008, the record was 517 moves (assuming optimal play by both sides) to make a piece capture or exchange that achieves a simpler and more obviously winnable sub-endgame, for a particular position involving a queen and knight versus a rook, bishop, and knight.

Many of the longest games on record involve the rook and bishop versus rook endgame, when the rule for more moves was in effect. (See pawnless chess endgame and rook and bishop versus rook endgame.)

== See also ==
- Chess endgame § Longest known forced win
- Threefold repetition
