= Bare king =

Chess position where one side has only a king

In chess and chess variants, a bare king (or lone king) is a king whose player has no other remaining pieces (i.e. all the player's other pieces have been captured).

== Effect on the game ==
=== Historical ===
In some old versions of chess, such as "baring chess" and shatranj, leaving the opponent with a bare king was one way of winning the game (see Checkmate § History). The relative weakness of the pieces in shatranj may have made this form of a win desirable. A possible exception to the bare king rule was if the king immediately after being bared was able to recapture, leaving the opponent with a bare king as well. This situation, called a "Medinese victory" (because in Medina, it was still a win for the player first baring the opposing king), was often considered a draw.

=== Contemporary ===
Under modern rules, a player with a bare king does not automatically lose and may continue playing. A bare king can never give check, however, and can therefore never deliver a checkmate or win the game. A bare king can in some situations play to a draw, such as by stalemate, capturing the opponent's pieces to reduce his advantage to an unwinnable one or if the opponent of a bare king oversteps the time limit. If both players are left with a bare king, the game is immediately drawn. Similarly, if one player has only a king and either a bishop or a knight while the opponent has a bare king, the game is immediately drawn.
