= Alexey Troitsky =

Russian chess player

Alexey Alexeyevich Troitsky
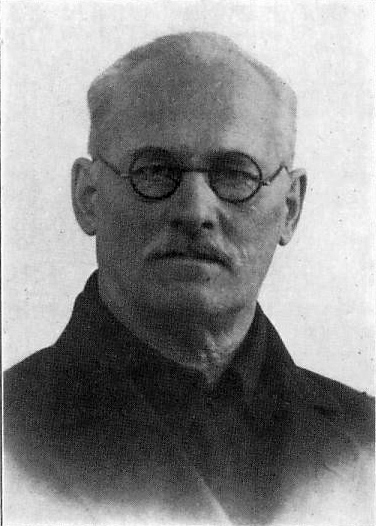
- A. A. Troitsky
- Born: 14 March 1866; Saint Petersburg
- Died: 14 August 1942 (aged 76); Saint Petersburg
- Occupation: chess composer
- Writing career
- Language: Russian
- Genre: chess theory
- Subject: endgame
- Notable work: Troitzky (1935)

Alexey Alexeyevich Troitsky (Russian: Алексе́й Алексе́евич Тро́ицкий; March 14, 1866 – August 1942; also Alexei, Troitzky, Troitzki) was a Russian chess theoretician. He is widely considered to have been one of the greatest composers of chess endgame studies. He is widely regarded as the founder of the modern art of composing chess studies (Seirawan 2003:91). Troitsky died of starvation during World War II at the siege of Leningrad. During the war, many of his notes got destroyed or lost so some of the latest chess problems he composed were never published.

One of his most famous works involves analyzing the endgame with two knights versus a pawn, see Troitsky line. John Nunn analyzed this endgame with an endgame tablebase and stated that "the analysis of Troitsky ... is astonishingly accurate" (Nunn 1995:265).

== Compositions ==
Troitsky was a prolific composer of endgame studies. Irving Chernev included nine of them in Chernev (1989). The diagram shows one of them.

Troitsky, 1909

Position: b8 black queen, c7 black knight, a4 white knight, d4 black king, g3 white queen, d2 white king

White to move and win

The main line goes:
1.	Nb6!	Qe8
2.	Nd7!	Kc4
3.	Qxc7+	Kb4
4.	Qc5+	Kb3
5.	Qc3+	Ka4
6.	Qd4+	Ka3
7.	Nc5	Qb8
8.	Qa1+	Kb4
9.	Na6+

and White wins (Chernev 1989:207–208).

== Books ==
- 500 Endspielstudien. Berlin: Verlag Kagan. 1924.
- Собрание шахматных этюдов [Collection of Chess Studies]. 1935.
- Reinfeld, Fred, ed. (1968) [1934]. 360 Brilliant and Instructive End Games. Dover Publications. ISBN 0-486-21959-3.
- Collection of Chess Studies: With a Supplement on the Theory of the End-Game of Two Knights Against Pawns. Tschaturanga. Vol. 66. Olms. 1985 [1935]. ISBN 3-283-00114-6.
- Collection of Chess Studies: With a Supplement on the Theory of the End-Game of Two Knights Against Pawns (Reprint of Troitzky (1985) ed.). Ishi Press. 2006 [1985]. ISBN 0-923891-10-2.

== See also ==
- Two knights endgame (contains the Troitsky line)
