= James Howell (chess player) =

English chess grandmaster (born 1967)

Personal information
- Born: 17 May 1967 (age 59) Harrogate, England

Chess career
- Country: England
- Title: Grandmaster (1995)
- FIDE rating: 2495 (October 2026)
- Peak rating: 2525 (July 1995)

James Clifford Howell (born 17 May 1967) is an English chess grandmaster and author. He earned his international master title in 1985 and his grandmaster title ten years later, in 1995. He reached his peak rating in July 1995, at 2525. He became inactive in 1996.

== Books ==
- Howell, James (1997), Essential Chess Endings: The tournament player's guide, Batsford, ISBN 0-7134-8189-7
