= Draw (chess) =

Result of a chess game ending in a tie

Example of a draw

Position: f7 white king, d4 black king, g4 white bishop

Draw by insufficient material. A king and one bishop versus a king cannot create a checkmate on either player.

In chess, there are a number of ways that a game can end in a draw, in which neither player wins. Draws are codified by various rules of chess including stalemate (when the player to move is not in check but has no legal move), threefold repetition (when the same position occurs three times with the same player to move), and the fifty-move rule (when the last fifty successive moves made by both players contain no capture or pawn move). Under the standard FIDE rules, a draw also occurs in a dead position (when no sequence of legal moves can lead to checkmate), most commonly when neither player has sufficient material to checkmate the opponent.

Unless specific tournament rules forbid it, players may agree to a draw at any time. Ethical considerations may make a draw uncustomary in situations where at least one player has a reasonable chance of winning. For example, a draw could be called after a move or two, but this would likely be thought unsporting.

In the 19th century, some tournaments, notably London 1883, required that drawn games be replayed; however, this was found to cause organisational problems due to the backlog. It is now standard practice to score a decisive game as one point to the winner, and a draw as a half point to each player.

The draw rate of grandmasters rated more than 2750 Elo has surpassed 70%, leading to fears of "draw death" and calls for rule changes.

== Draw rules ==
The rules allow for several types of draws: stalemate, threefold or fivefold repetition of a position, if there has been no capture or a pawn being moved in the last fifty or seventy-five moves, if checkmate is impossible, or if the players agree to a draw. In games played under time control, a draw may result under additional conditions. A stalemate is an automatic draw, as is a draw due to impossibility of checkmate. A draw by threefold repetition or the fifty-move rule may be claimed by one of the players with the arbiter (normally using his score sheet), and claiming it is optional. The draw by fivefold repetition or the seventy-five-move rule is mandatory by the arbiter.

A claim of a draw first counts as an offer of a draw, and the opponent may accept the draw without the arbiter examining the claim. Once a claim or draw offer has been made, it cannot be withdrawn. If the claim is verified or the draw offer accepted, the game is over. Otherwise, the offer or claim is nullified and the game continues; the draw offer is no longer in effect.

The correct procedure for an offer of a draw is to first make a move, verbally offer the draw, then press the clock. The other player may decline the draw offer by making a move, in which case the draw offer is no longer in effect, or else indicate acceptance. The offer of a draw should be recorded by each player in their score sheet using the symbol (=) as per Appendix C.12 of FIDE Laws of Chess.

=== Scoring ===
In early tournaments, draws were often replayed until one of the players won; however, this was found to be impractical and caused organisational difficulties. The 1867 Paris tournament even ignored draws altogether, effectively treating them as double losses. The 1867 Dundee tournament initiated the awarding of a half point for draws, which is now standard practice. The Monte Carlo chess tournaments of 1901 and 1902 used a system where drawn games were replayed once, with the winner of the replay getting three-quarters of a point, the loser one-quarter of a point, and if the replay were drawn, both players scored a half-point. A minority of tournaments use a different scoring scheme, such as "football scoring" where three points are awarded to the winner and one point to each in the event of a draw. For the purpose of calculating Elo rating, all tournaments are treated as if they were using standard scoring.

== Draws in all games ==
Article 5 of the 2018 FIDE Laws of Chess gives the basic ways a game may end in a draw; more complicated ways are detailed in Article 9:

- Stalemate – if the player on turn has no legal move but is not in check, this is stalemate and the game is automatically a draw.
- Threefold repetition rule – if an identical position has occurred at least three times during the course of the game with the same player to move each time, and is the current position on the board or will occur after the player on turn makes their move, the player on move may claim a draw (to the arbiter). In such a case the draw is not automatic – a player must claim it if they want the draw. When the position occurs for the third time after the player's intended next move, they write the move on their score sheet but does not make the move on the board and claims the draw. Article 9.2 states that a position is considered identical to another if the same player is on move, the same types of pieces of the same colours occupy the same squares, and the same moves are available to each player; in particular, each player has the same castling and en passant capturing rights. (A player may lose their right to castle; and an en passant capture is available only at the first opportunity.) If the claim is not made on the move in which the repetition occurs, the player forfeits the right to make the claim. Of course, the opportunity may present itself again.
  - Fivefold repetition – If the same position occurs five times during the course of the game, the game is automatically a draw (i.e. a player does not have to claim it).
- Fifty-move rule – if in the previous 50 moves by each side, no pawn has moved and no capture has been made, a draw may be claimed by either player. Here again, the draw is not automatic and must be claimed if the player wants the draw. If the player whose turn it is to move has made only 49 such moves, they may write their next move on the scoresheet and claim a draw. As with the threefold repetition, the right to claim the draw is forfeited if it is not used on that move, but the opportunity may occur again.
  - Seventy-five-move rule – If no capture or no pawn move has occurred in the last 75 moves (by both players), the game is automatically a draw (i.e. a player does not have to claim it). If the last move was a checkmate, the checkmate stands.
- Impossibility of checkmate – if a position arises in which neither player could possibly give checkmate by a series of legal moves, the game is a draw. Such a position is called a dead position. This is usually because there is insufficient material left, but it is possible in other positions too, such as a blocked king and pawn ending where it is impossible for either king to capture the pawns. Material balances with insufficient material to checkmate by any sequence of legal moves are:
  - king versus king
  - king and bishop versus king
  - king and knight versus king
  - king and bishop versus king and bishop with the bishops on the same colour.
- Mutual agreement – a player may offer a draw to their opponent at any stage of a game. If the opponent accepts, the game is a draw.

There is no longer a rule defining perpetual check—a situation in which one player gives a series of checks from which the other player cannot escape—as a draw. Any perpetual check situation will eventually be claimable as a draw under the threefold repetition rule or the fifty-move rule; more commonly the players will simply agree a draw. By 1965, perpetual check was no longer in the rules.

Although these are the laws as laid down by FIDE and, as such, are used at almost all top-level tournaments, at lower levels different rules may operate, particularly with regard to rapid play finish provisions.

=== Examples ===
Korchnoi vs. Karpov, 1978

Position: f7 white king, g7 white bishop, h7 black king, a4 black pawn, a3 white pawn

Position after 124.Bg7, Black is stalemated.
Fischer vs. Petrosian, 1971

Position: a7 black pawn, b7 black pawn, f7 black pawn, h7 black king, c6 black pawn, f6 black queen, h6 black pawn, d5 black rook, f5 white pawn, f4 white rook, h3 white pawn, a2 white pawn, c2 white pawn, e2 white queen, f2 white pawn, h1 white king

Position after 30.Qe2, after 32.Qe2, and after 34.Qe2, the game is drawn by threefold repetition.
Timman vs. Lutz, 1995

Position: h7 black king, b5 black rook, f5 white king, g5 white rook, f4 white bishop

Position after 121...Rb5+, the game is drawn by fifty-move rule.

Vidmar vs. Maróczy, 1932

Position: c7 black bishop, f7 black king, g4 white king

Draw by insufficient material. No sequence of legal moves can lead to checkmate.
Mednis, 1990

Position: d6 black king, f6 black pawn, h6 black pawn, c5 black pawn, e5 black pawn, f5 white pawn, g5 black pawn, h5 white pawn, b4 black pawn, c4 white pawn, e4 white pawn, g4 white pawn, a3 black pawn, b3 white pawn, d3 white bishop, a2 white pawn, e2 white king

Draw. No sequence of legal moves can lead to checkmate.
Petrosian vs. Fischer, 1958

Position: g8 black rook, f7 white pawn, g6 white pawn, g5 white king, c3 black pawn, c2 black king

Position after 67.f7, draw agreed.

== Draws in timed games ==
In games played with a time control, there are other ways a draw can occur.

Position: a8 white king, e8 black circle, g8 white bishop, h8 white king, a7 white knight, b7 black bishop, c7 black king, e7 black circle, g7 black bishop, e6 black circle, g6 black king, e5 black circle, a4 black circle, b4 black circle, c4 black circle, d4 black circle, e4 black circle, f4 black circle, g4 black circle, h4 black circle, b3 black king, e3 black circle, g3 black knight, h3 black king, c2 black knight, e2 black circle, a1 white king, b1 white knight, e1 black circle, g1 white bishop, h1 white king

Possible checkmate positions for Black. If White runs out of time with one of these combinations of material, Black wins because of the possible checkmate. In a sudden death time control, however, if White can convince the arbiter before the time is up that Black is merely stalling to win on time, the game is nevertheless declared a draw.
- In a sudden death time control (players have a limited time to play all of their moves), if it is discovered that both players have exceeded their time allotment, the game is a draw. (The game continues if it is not a sudden-death time control.)
- If only one player has exceeded the time limit, but the other player does not have sufficient mating material, the game is still a draw. Law 6.9 of the FIDE Laws of Chess states that: "If a player does not complete the prescribed number of moves in the allotted time, the game is lost by the player. However, the game is drawn if the position is such that the opponent cannot checkmate the player's king by any possible series of legal moves, even with the most unskilled counterplay." It is still possible to lose on time in positions where mate is extremely unlikely but not theoretically impossible, as with king and bishop versus king and knight. (Under USCF rules, king and bishop, king and knight, or king and 2 knights with no pawns on the board is not considered sufficient mating material, unless the opponent has a forced win, even though it is theoretically possible to mate (but extremely unlikely to happen) in situations such as K+B vs. K+N). There are differences between USCF and FIDE rules, whereby USCF requires checkmate be forced and FIDE requires it only be legally possible.
- Because of this last possibility, article 10 of the FIDE laws of chess states that when a player has less than two minutes left on their clock during a rapid play finish (the end of a game when all remaining moves must be completed within a limited amount of time), they may claim a draw if their opponent is not attempting to win the game by "normal means" or cannot win the game by "normal means". "Normal means" can be taken to mean the delivery of checkmate or the winning of material. In other words, a draw is claimable if the opponent is merely attempting to win on time, or cannot possibly win except on time. It is up to the arbiter to decide whether such a claim will be granted or not.

== Frequency of draws ==
In chess games played at the top level, a draw is the most common outcome of a game: of around 22,000 games published in The Week in Chess played between 1999 and 2002 by players with a FIDE Elo rating of 2500 or above, 55 percent were draws. According to chess analyst Jeff Sonas, although an upward draw rate trend can be observed in general master-level play since the beginning of the 20th century, it is currently "holding pretty steady around 50%, and is only increasing at a very slow rate". The draw rate of elite grandmasters, rated more than 2750 Elo, is, however, significantly higher, surpassing 70% in 2017 and 2018.

In top-level correspondence chess under ICCF, where computer assistance is allowed, the draw rate is much higher than in the over-the-board chess: of 1512 games played in the World Championship finals and the Candidates' sections between 2010 and 2013, 82.3% ended in a draw. Since that time, draw rate in top-level correspondence play has been rising steadily, reaching 97% in 2019. Engine tests strongly suggest that the result of a perfectly played game is a draw, and that the draw margin is quite large: White cannot force a win without Black making significant mistakes.

The high draw rate has often led to fears of "draw death", as the top players draw an ever-increasing percentage of their games and the game becomes played out: such sentiments have been expressed by World Champions Emanuel Lasker, José Raúl Capablanca, Bobby Fischer, and Vladimir Kramnik. All four advocated changing the rules of chess to avoid the problem, and with the advent of modern chess engines playing at an extremely high level, their ideas have been tested. Based on tests in correspondence and engine play, GM Larry Kaufman (one of the original authors of Komodo) and correspondence chess grandmaster Arno Nickel have suggested an extension of Lasker's proposal, which would score stalemate, king and minor piece versus king with the superior side to move (similar to the old bare king rule), and threefold repetition as ¾–¼ rather than draws – for threefold repetition, this means penalising the player who brought about a repetition with ¼ of a point, which is similar to how repetitions are sometimes forbidden in xiangqi, shogi, and Go. (Lasker's original proposal was only for stalemate and bare king; it was supported by Richard Réti and considered not harmful – though unnecessary – by Max Euwe. Capablanca thought that doing this for stalemate would be enough.) Engine tests by Kaufman using Komodo suggest that at over-the-board human World Championship level, this would lower the draw rate from 65.6% to just 22.6%.

Other ideas have also been suggested, such as the "football scoring": 0 for a loss, 1 for a draw, and 3 for a win, which is equivalent to scoring a draw as a third of a point rather than a half point. This has been criticised, however. Kaufman argues that this solution misses the point: it reduces the incentive to draw, but the reason for the high draw rate is not one of incentives, but rather that White's first-move advantage is not enough to win. Thus Kaufman calls this solution "terrible", going against "the very nature of the game": he writes that "The inferior side should be trying to draw, and to penalize Black for obtaining a good result is crazy. It makes chess like a game of 'chicken'; who will 'blink' first and play an unsound move to avoid the mutually bad result of a draw?" Nickel has likewise criticised this idea as "wholly inadequate", creating "an artificial and empty pressure at best", and creating unfairness and incentivising "game manipulations" in team events or double round-robins. Kaufman speaks more favourably of an idea by Ed Epp, which is to score draws as 0.4–0.6, equalising the expected score for White and Black; but while he writes that he is "all for this idea", he also admits that "the benefit would be small, most games would have the same outcome".

== Drawing combinations ==
Yuri Averbakh gives these combinations for the weaker side to draw:

- perpetual check
- stalemate
- blockade
- perpetual pursuit
- fortress
- drawing balance of forces

== Terminology ==
Position: h8 white rook, g4 black bishop, g3 black king, e2 black rook, f1 white king

Position after 123...Kg3, only 124.Rf8! draws.
- A book draw or theoretical draw is a position that is known to result in a draw if both sides play optimally.
- A positional draw is an impasse other than stalemate, where a draw is salvaged despite a big material disadvantage (see Fortress (chess) § Positional draw).
- A grandmaster draw is a game in which the players quickly agree to a draw after making little or no effort to win (see Draw by agreement § Grandmaster draw).

Andy Soltis discusses the vagueness of the terms "draw", "drawish", "drawable", "book draw", "easy draw", and "dead draw". In books and chess theory a position is considered to be a draw if best play leads to a draw – the difficulty of the defence is not taken into account. Soltis calls these positions "drawable". For instance, under that criterion the rook and bishop versus rook endgame is usually a theoretical draw or book draw, but the side with the bishop often wins in practice. In this position from an actual game, the only move to draw is 124.Rf8! White actually played 124.Rd8?? and lost after 124...Re3, with the winning threat of 125...Bh3+ 126.Kg1 Re1#.

== See also ==
- Rules of chess
- Tie (draw)

=== Articles on draw rules ===
- Draw by agreement
- Fifty-move rule
- Stalemate
- Threefold repetition
