= Wrong rook pawn =

Chess end-game position

In a chess endgame of a king, bishop, and pawn versus a bare king, or, less commonly, a king, rook, and pawn versus a bishop and king, a wrong rook pawn is a rook pawn (a pawn on the a- or h-file) whose promotion square is the opposite color from the bishop's square color. Since a side's rook pawns promote on opposite-colored squares, and a bishop can only move on one color, one of the pawns may be the "wrong rook pawn". This situation is also known as having the wrong-colored bishop or wrong bishop (i.e. the bishop is on the wrong-colored squares in relation to the rook pawn). In many cases, the wrong rook pawn will only draw, when any other pawn would win. This is because the defending side can sometimes get their king to the corner in front of the pawn, after which the attacking side cannot chase the king away to enable promotion. A fairly common defensive tactic is to reach one of these drawn endgames, often through a sacrifice.

In some endgames, such as bishop and pawn versus king (perhaps with pawns), the wrong rook pawn is the one whose promotion square is opposite the color on which the bishop moves, which makes the stronger side unable to win. This was known at least as early as 1623, as evidenced by an endgame study by Gioachino Greco.

A less common situation is the defense of bishop versus rook and rook pawn; the wrong rook pawn is the one that promotes on the square not controlled by the bishop, because the defending king and bishop can form a blockade in the corner (on the pawn's promotion square) and draw the game. This is also called the safe corner for the defending king.

== Bishop and pawn ==
Müller & Lamprecht

Position: a8 black king, e7 white bishop, a6 white pawn, b6 white king

The wrong rook pawn, draw with either side to move

In this type of endgame, the wrong rook pawn is the one whose queening square is the opposite color as that on which the bishop resides. Many such positions are drawn because of a fortress if the defending king can get to the corner in front of the pawn. (See the diagram.) With the bishop not able to control the a8-square, the black king cannot be forced away from the corner, so the pawn will not be able to promote. This is the basic type of position for most of these endgames.

=== Defending king in front of pawn ===
Mednis, 1987

Position: f8 white king, f7 white bishop, h6 black king, h5 white pawn

White to move wins. Black to move draws.

In a king and pawn versus king endgame with a rook pawn, the defending king only has to get in front of the pawn to draw the game. In contrast, in the endgame with a bishop and the wrong rook pawn, getting the defending king in front of the pawn will not necessarily draw. In this position from Edmar Mednis, White wins if it is their move.

1. Kg8! Kg5
2. Kg7

and the pawn promotes. Black to move draws by 1... Kh7! followed by 2... Kh8. The defending king must be in or near the corner to be sure of a draw.

=== Examples from games ===
==== Goglidze versus Kasparian ====
Goglidze vs. Kasparian, 1929

Position: f7 white bishop, g7 black king, e6 white king, e5 white pawn, h5 white pawn, d1 black bishop

Black to move draws with 1...Bg4+!

In this position from a 1929 game between Viktor Arsentievich Goglidze and Genrikh Kasparian, Black uses the tactic of offering the sacrifice of his bishop for the pawn on the e-file to leave White with the wrong rook pawn:

1... Bg4+!

and the game was drawn twelve moves later. The bishop will remain on the c8–h3 diagonal and sacrifice itself for the e-pawn if it advances to e6. (Note that 1...Bb3+ 2.Ke7 Bxf7 does not work because of 3.h6+!)

==== Fischer versus Taimanov ====
Fischer vs. Taimanov, 1971

Position: f6 white king, d5 black king, e5 black knight, g4 white bishop, h3 white pawn

Black to move can draw.

In this game from the 1971 World Chess Championship Candidate's Match, the second game between Bobby Fischer and Mark Taimanov, Black could have drawn the game because of the wrong rook pawn. One way is:

81... Nd3!
82. h4 Nf4

Now White must dislodge or capture the knight in order to allow the pawn to safely advance, but doing so allows the black king into the corner:

83. Kf5 Kd6!
84. Kxf4 Ke7 =

In the actual game, Black mistakenly moved his king further from the corner (81...Ke4??) and lost because a knight has a hard time defending against rook pawns. The game continued 82.Bc8! Kf4 83.h4 Nf3 84.h5 Ng5 85.Bf5; see Zugzwang#Fischer vs. Taimanov, second match game for the game's conclusion. (Fischer went on to win the match 6–0 and advance to the next round, and subsequently became World Champion.)

==== Ķeņģis versus Kasparov ====
Ķeņģis vs. Kasparov, 1973

Position: a6 black pawn, e5 white bishop, f5 black pawn, e4 black bishop, g4 black king, b3 white pawn, d3 black pawn, e3 white king

Black to move, draw

Ten-year-old Garry Kasparov (Note: He was still using his birth name of Garry Weinstein at the time.) thought that he was winning this game as Black against Edvīns Ķeņģis, being two pawns ahead. Indeed, Black can win the white bishop (for two pawns), but then the game is a draw because of the wrong rook pawn. In the actual game, Black moved 48...Kh3 and the game was drawn after move 54. (No progress can be made with the bishops on opposite colors, see opposite-colored bishop endgame.) In an alternative line, Black can win the white bishop:

48... f4+
49. Bxf4 d2
50. Kxd2 Kxf4

but the position is drawn because the black rook pawn is on the wrong file for the bishop to help promote it.

==== Karpov versus Kasparov ====
Karpov vs. Kasparov, 1985

Position: f7 black bishop, d6 black king, g6 black pawn, a5 black pawn, b5 white bishop, f5 black pawn, a4 white pawn, d4 white king, f4 white pawn, h4 white pawn

Position after 82.Kd4. Black sacrifices two pawns for one to leave White with the wrong rook pawn.

Garry Kasparov used sacrifices to leave Anatoly Karpov with the wrong rook pawn to save the twentieth game of their 1985 World Championship, after a long endgame. In this position, Black sacrificed two pawns for one (the ones on f5 and g6 for the one on a4):

82... Bb3!
83. Be8 Ke7
84. Bxg6 Bxa4
85. Bxf5 Kf6
½–½

A draw was agreed because the black bishop can stop the advance of the pawn on the f-file, sacrificing itself if necessary, leaving White with the wrong rook pawn (the one on the h-file). (Kasparov went on to win the match 13–11 and became World Champion for the first time.)

==== Korchnoi versus Karpov ====
Korchnoi vs. Karpov, 1978

Position: b5 black pawn, f5 white king, a4 black pawn, f4 white bishop, a3 white pawn, f3 black king

Position after 99.Bf4

In this game from the 1978 World Championship between Victor Korchnoi and Anatoly Karpov, White's pawn is the wrong rook pawn. White went on to capture the black b-pawn on move 107, but was unable to force the black king far enough away from the a8-square to get to a winning position. The game ended in an intentional stalemate on move 124 (see Stalemate#Korchnoi versus Karpov for the final position). Some commentators thought that Korchnoi might have missed a win in this endgame, but Karpov defended well and White never had a theoretically won position. (However, Korchnoi did miss a win earlier in the game.) Black's pawn on b5 is actually a liability. If the black king is forced into a position where he cannot move, Black would have to move the pawn and White would win the game. Until the sixth game of the World Chess Championship 2021, this was the longest game of a world championship. (Karpov retained his title by a score of six wins to five.)

=== An exception ===
from Griffiths

Position: a8 black king, b7 black pawn, d7 white king, a6 black pawn, b6 white bishop, a5 white pawn

White to move wins, an exception because of the black pawns.

In this position White wins because they are able to use zugzwang to force Black to allow the white pawn to capture the black b-pawn and thus reach the b-file.

1. Be3 Kb8
2. Bd4 Ka8
3. Kc8

and checkmate occurs in two more moves. If Black did not have his rook pawn, he could draw by 3...b5.

== Opposite-colored bishops ==
Fine & Benko, position 418

Position: a8 black king, f6 white pawn, a5 white pawn, b5 white king, d5 black bishop, e3 white bishop

Draw because of the wrong rook pawn

Usually when each side has a bishop and they are on opposite-colored squares and one side has two widely separated pawns, the stronger side wins. However, if one of the pawns is the wrong rook pawn and the defending king is blocking it, the position is usually a draw because the defending bishop can stop the other pawn. If the defending bishop is sacrificed for the other pawn, the resulting position is a draw like the ones above.

de la Villa, position 9.3

Position: g8 black king, g6 white pawn, h6 white pawn, f5 white king, c4 white bishop, c3 black bishop

Draw because of wrong rook pawn. Note that unlike in the basic wrong rook pawn endgame, the king cannot move to the corner: 1...Kh8?? 2.Ke6! Kg8 3.Ke7+ Kh8 4.Kf7 leaves Black unable to stop the g-pawn's promotion. Black must instead play 1...Kf8!.

With opposite-colored bishops, two connected pawns win if they safely reach the sixth rank, except when one is the wrong rook pawn, i.e. the defending bishop is on the long diagonal that includes the square on which the rook pawn would promote.

=== Example from game ===
Walther vs. Fischer, 1959

Position: d7 black king, d6 black bishop, b5 white king, a4 white pawn, h4 black pawn, f3 white bishop, h3 white pawn, b2 white pawn

Position after 54.a4?

In this game between FIDE Master Edgar Walther and Bobby Fischer, White has just made a bad move (54.a4?; 54.b4! wins). Black's defensive plan is to sacrifice his bishop for the two queenside pawns, leaving White with the wrong rook pawn (the h-pawn) for his bishop. The game was drawn nine moves later.

== Rook and rook pawn versus bishop ==
Berger (Fine & Benko, position 930)

Position: h8 black king, g7 white rook, f6 white king, h5 white pawn, b1 black bishop

White to move, draw

The wrong rook pawn may come up in other situations, such as this position with a rook and rook pawn versus a bishop. This time the bishop is defending against the rook pawn. If the pawn had not yet reached the fifth rank, White would win. Play might continue:

1. Rb7 Bc2
2. Kg5 Bd3
3. Kh6 Kg8!
4. Rg7+ Kf8!!

4...Kh8?? loses.

½–½

White cannot win because the white king cannot move to the h5-square. If the bishop were on the other colored squares, White would win.

If the defending king is in the corner controlled by his bishop then the pawn can be sacrificed at the right moment to get to a winning rook versus bishop position. If the defending king is in the corner opposite his bishop's color, sacrificing the pawn does not work because the defender easily forms a fortress in the corner. This is also referred to as the defending king being in the "safe" corner, since with the king in the corner with the bishop next to it, he is safe from the rook.

=== Examples from games ===
Euwe vs. Hromádka, 1922

Position: h5 black pawn, g4 black king, a2 black rook, f2 white bishop, g1 white king

Black to move should win, but errs and allows a draw.

In this position from a game between future World Champion Max Euwe and Karel Hromádka, Black should win but he errs by advancing his pawn too soon. Play continued:

1... h4??

Black wins easily after 1...Kh3!

2. Bd4 Kh3?

Black still could have won here with 2...Re2!, but it is complicated.

3. Be5 Rg2+
4. Kf1! ½–½

van Wely vs. Nakamura, 2013

Position: h7 black king, h5 white pawn, a4 black bishop, e3 white king, f3 white rook

White to move

This 2013 game between Loek van Wely and Hikaru Nakamura was drawn. If White tries 64.Kf4 then after 64...Kh6 65.Rh3 Be8 66.Rh2 Bb5 67.Kf5 Bc4 draws, or 67...Kh7 68.Kg5 Bd3! is a book draw, because the pawn is too far advanced. The game continued:

64. Rf6 Be8
65. h6 Bg6
66. Rxg6 Kxg6
67. h7 Kxh7
½–½

== In studies ==
=== Rauzer ===
Study by Rauzer, 1928

Position: a6 black circle, e6 white king, b5 black circle, e5 white bishop, h5 black circle, a4 black pawn, c4 black circle, e4 black king, g4 black circle, a3 white pawn, d3 black circle, f3 black circle

White wins if the white king and bishop confine the black king on or below the line (including on e4).

In this 1928 endgame study by Vsevolod Rauzer, White can force a win if the black king is on or below the line indicated, and white king and bishop are placed to prevent the black king from escaping. It may take up to 33 moves to capture the black pawn. Similar positions were studied by Josef Kling and Bernhard Horwitz in 1851 and by Johann Berger in 1921. A very similar position occurred in the Korchnoi–Karpov game above.

=== Greco ===
Greco, 1623

Position: a8 black rook, f5 black bishop, g5 black king, f3 white bishop, f2 white rook, g2 white pawn, h2 white pawn, g1 white king

Black to play and draw

The theme is used in this 1623 composition by Gioachino Greco. Black draws:

1...Ra1+
2. Rf1 Rxf1+
3. Kxf1 Bh3!

and Black will sacrifice his bishop for the g-pawn or it transforms into an h-pawn after 4.gxh3.
