= Opposite-colored bishops endgame =

Chess endgame

The opposite-colored bishops endgame is a chess endgame in which each side has a single bishop and those bishops operate on opposite-colored squares. Without other pieces besides pawns and the kings, these endings are widely known for their tendency to result in a draw. These are the most difficult endings in which to convert a small material advantage to a win. With additional pieces, the stronger side has more chances to win, but still not as many as when bishops are on the same color.

Many players in a poor position have escaped a loss by trading down to such an endgame. These endgames are normally drawn when one side has a one-pawn advantage. Two or even three extra pawns may not suffice for a win either, since the weaker side can create a blockade on the squares on which their bishop operates.

== General principles ==
Edmar Mednis gives two principles for endgames with bishops on opposite colors:

1. If a player is down material he should look for drawing chances in an endgame with only the bishops and pawns.
2. With major pieces (queen or rook) on the board, having bishops on opposite colors favors the side with an attack.

Ian Rogers gives three principles when there are only the bishops and pawns:

1. Two connected pawns are not sufficient to win unless they reach their sixth rank.
2. If the attacker has two widely separated passed pawns that cannot be controlled by the opposing bishop on a single diagonal, they usually win.
3. When the attacker has an outside passed pawn, it should be stopped by the bishop only when the king can block the opposing king.

== Drawing tendency ==
In endings with opposite-colored bishops, a material advantage is much less important than in most endgames and position is more important. Positions where one side has an extra pawn are usually drawn, and it is not uncommon to have two extra pawns (occasionally more) and to be unable to make progress. About half of the endings with a bishop and two pawns versus a bishop on the opposite color are drawn. (By contrast, over 90% are won if the bishops are on the same color.)

Zugzwang is a tool that often helps the superior side win an endgame. It is a fairly common occurrence in endings with bishops on the same color but is much less common in endgames with opposite-colored bishops.

The weaker side should often try to make his bishop bad by placing his pawns on the same color of his bishop in order to defend his remaining pawns, thereby creating an impregnable fortress. The attacker should generally put his pawns on squares of the opposite color as his bishop to prevent a blockade.

== Bishop and pawn versus bishop ==
This is almost always a draw. The attacker's bishop is practically useless and the defender should draw if his king can reach any square in front of the pawn that is not of the color of the attacking bishop; or if his bishop can permanently attack any square in front of the pawn. These endings are trivially drawn 99% of the time.

== Bishop and two pawns versus a bishop ==
About half of these positions are drawn. In most other endings, a two-pawn advantage is usually an easy win. For comparison, if the bishops were on the same color squares, over 90% of the positions would be wins.

There are three general cases, depending on the two pawns. In most endings, a pair of connected pawns have the best winning chances, but in these endings, a widely separated pair of pawns have the best chances unless one of the pawns is the wrong rook pawn.

=== Doubled pawns ===
With doubled pawns, the position is a draw if the defending king can reach any square in front of the pawns that is not of the color of the attacker's bishop. The second pawn on the file is of no help, so this is like the ending with only one pawn. If the defending king and bishop cannot accomplish this, the first pawn will win the defending bishop and the second one will promote.

=== Isolated pawns ===
Position: c7 black king, e7 black bishop, c6 white pawn, d5 white king, e5 white pawn, h5 white bishop

Isolated pawns. White to play, a draw. White wins if the pawn is on f5 instead of e5.

With isolated pawns (on non-adjacent files), the outcome depends on how widely separated the pawns are. The more widely separated they are, the better the winning chances. The rule that holds in most cases is that if only one file separates the pawns the game is a draw, otherwise the attacker wins. The reason is that if the pawns are more widely separated, the defending king must block one pawn while his bishop blocks the other pawn. Then the attacking king can support the pawn blocked by the bishop and win the piece. If only one file is between the pawns, the defender can stop the advance of the pawns. See the diagram. If three files separate the pawns, the pawns normally win. However, there are positions where the defender can set up a blockade, especially if one of the pawns is the wrong rook pawn.

Averbakh, 1972

Position: c7 black bishop, d7 white bishop, c6 white pawn, g5 black king, e4 white king, f3 white pawn

White to move, draw

In this position from Yuri Averbakh, Black draws since the bishop can restrain both pawns on the same diagonal with the help of the king and the white bishop is helpless.

1. Kd5 Kf6!

The white king will not get to e6.

2. Kc5 Ke7
3. Kb5 Bf4
4. Kb6 Kd8, draw.

N. Miller vs. A. Saidy, 1971

Position: d7 black king, c5 black pawn, d5 white king, e3 black bishop, g3 black pawn, f1 white bishop

White resigned in this drawn position.

An example is the game N. Miller vs. A. Saidy, American Open 1971. White resigned in this position because he knew a "rule" articulated by Fine in the first edition of Basic Chess Endings: "If the pawns are two or more files apart, they win." Since here three files separate the pawns, White assumed his position was hopeless. However, the position is actually a fairly straightforward draw, since "White's King has such a powerful active location that he can keep Black's King from penetrating either side of the board.". Play might continue 1. Bh3+ Ke7 2. Bg2 Kf6 3. Bh3 Kg5 4. Bg2 Kf4 5. Kc4! Bd4 6. Kd3 Bg1 7. Bc6 Kg4 8. Bg2! Bf2 9. Kc4! Kf4 10. Kd3 Ke5 11. Kc4, when, "Clearly there is no way for Black to break the blockade."

==== Wrong rook pawn ====
Alekhine vs. Ed. Lasker, 1924

Position: f8 black king, h5 black pawn, b4 black bishop, d4 black pawn, a2 white bishop, f1 white king

Draw despite Black's two well-separated pawns

If one of the two pawns is the wrong rook pawn (i.e. an a- or h-pawn whose queening square is the opposite color from the squares on which the superior side's bishop moves), a fortress may allow the inferior side to draw irrespective of how far apart the two pawns are. This is illustrated by Alekhine–Ed. Lasker, New York City 1924. (complete game) Three files separate Black's two pawns, but the players agreed to a draw after 52.Bb1 Kg7 53.Kg2. Alekhine explained in the tournament book that White "can now sacrifice his Bishop for the [d-pawn], inasmuch as the King has settled himself in the all-important corner".

If one of the pawns is the wrong rook pawn, it does not matter how widely separated or how advanced the pawns are. The outcome depends on whether or not the defending king can get into the corner in front of the rook pawn and sacrifice his bishop for the other pawn.

==== Recap ====
Grandmaster Jesús de la Villa emphasizes the importance of this endgame and gives this breakdown depending on how many files separate the pawns:

- If the pawns are separated by two files:
1. Two bishop pawns normally win
2. With a knight pawn and a central pawn the position is usually a draw, but there are winning chances if the knight pawn is not far advanced and the attacking bishop controls its promotion square
3. with a rook pawn and a central pawn the endgame is a draw
- If the pawns are separated by three files:
1. With a knight pawn there are drawing chances if the pawn is far advanced
2. With a rook pawn the position is usually won
- If the pawns are separated by four files

The ending is won because the attacking king gets between the pawns.

=== Connected pawns ===
Positions with connected pawns are the most complex case, and the result depends on the ranks and files of the pawns and the colors and locations of the bishops. If one of the pawns is a rook pawn (on the a- or h- file) the position is normally drawn. If the pawns are on the opposite color as the defender's bishop, the defender may be able to blockade the pawns and draw. If both pawns can safely reach the sixth rank, they win unless one is the wrong rook pawn, i.e. the rook pawn that promotes on the square of the same color as the defending bishop.

Position: c7 black bishop, e7 black king, b5 white bishop, d5 white pawn, e5 white pawn, d4 white king

Connected pawns on the fifth rank, the ideal defensive setup. Black draws (either player to move).

The ideal drawing setup is seen in the diagram at left. Black's king (on a square not of the color of the opposing bishop) and bishop stay two ranks in front of the pawns, with both defending against a pawn advance (here d6 by White) to the same color square as the bishop. The defending bishop must maintain an attack on the pawn on the same color square as itself, so that the attacking king is not allowed to advance. If White pushes the other (unattacked) pawn, Black's bishop sacrifices itself for both pawns, with a draw. (If the second pawn is protected and advances instead, the position is also a draw.) In the diagram position, Black on move passes (i.e. a waiting move that maintains the attack on the pawn) with 1... Bb8! 2. Ke4 Bc7! 3. Kf5 Bb8! and so on. White cannot make progress: 4. d6+ is met, as always, by 4... Bxd6 5. exd6+ Kxd6 with an immediate draw; 4. e6 gives Black an unbreakable blockade on the dark squares; and White can never prepare for d6+ by playing Kc5 because Black plays ... Bxe5.

Position: d8 black king, f8 black bishop, d6 white pawn, e6 white pawn, b5 white bishop, d5 white king

Connected pawns on the sixth rank. White wins (either player to move).

A similar position with White's pawns on the sixth rank is a win because the black bishop has no room to move and maintain the attack on the pawn on d6, thus Black is defeated because of zugzwang. In the position at right, Black loses immediately. Black, on move, must give way with either bishop or king, allowing White to move e7, winning, or else play the hopeless 1... Bxd6 2. Kxd6. If White is to move in this position, he plays a waiting move such as 1. Kc6, placing Black in the same predicament (1... Ke8 2. Kc7#).

== More pawns ==
Position: c7 black king, e6 white bishop, f6 black pawn, c5 black bishop, e5 black pawn, g5 black pawn, e4 white king, h4 black pawn, h3 white pawn

Drawing fortress with bishops on opposite colors, Black to move.

Draws are possible with more pawns. This is an example of a drawing fortress with opposite-colored bishops when three pawns behind. White simply keeps his bishop on the h3 to c8 diagonal. (See Fortress (chess)#Opposite-colored bishops.) Positions with three pawns versus none are wins 90% of the time.

== Examples from master games ==
=== Berger vs. Kotlerman ===
Berger vs. Kotlerman, 1948

Position: f5 white bishop, b4 black pawn, f4 black bishop, c3 black king, e3 black pawn, f1 white king

White to move draws.

In Berger versus Kotlerman, the pawns are separated by two files, but the game was drawn.

1. Ke2 b3
2. Kd1 Kb4
3. Bh7 Ka3
4. Bg6 Kb2
5. Bf7! Ka2
6. Be6 Ka3
7. Bf5! ½–½

If 7...b2, then 8.Bb1. If Black keeps his king near the b-pawn, then White moves his king. If the king goes to g2 trying to displace the white king, White moves the bishop.

=== Piskov vs. Nunn ===
Yury Piskov vs. John Nunn, 1992

Position: a8 white rook, e8 black rook, g8 black king, a7 black pawn, d7 black bishop, g6 black pawn, c5 black pawn, d5 white pawn, f5 black queen, g5 white bishop, c4 white pawn, d4 black pawn, h4 white queen, h3 white pawn, a2 white pawn, g1 white king

White to move

In this game Black has an inferior position, but he draws by exchanging queens and rooks, giving up two pawns, and reaching a drawn endgame:

37. Bf6 Qh5!
38. Qxh5 gxh5
39. Rxe8+ Bxe8
40. Be7 Bg6
41. Bxc5 Kf7!
42. Bxd4 a6
43. a3 Bd3
44. c5 Bc4
45. d6 Ke6
46. Kf2 Kd7

Piskov vs. Nunn

Position: d7 black king, a6 black pawn, d6 white pawn, c5 white pawn, h5 black pawn, c4 black bishop, d4 white bishop, a3 white pawn, h3 white pawn, f2 white king

Position after 46...Kd7

The blockade has been set up. Black's pawns can be protected by his bishop and White's passed pawns cannot make any progress. The game continued:

47. Kg3 Be6
48. h4 Kc6
49. ½–½

=== Nunn ===
Position from Nunn

Position: c7 black king, c6 white pawn, e6 white king, g5 black pawn, f4 black pawn, c3 black bishop, f3 white bishop, h3 white pawn, g2 white pawn

Black to move, White wins

In this position from Nunn (a slight modification of a simultaneous game), White wins:

1... Be1
2. Kf6! Bh4
3. Kf5 Kd6
4. g3 fxg3
5. Bg2 Kc7
6. Ke5 g4
7. hxg4

and White wins easily by supporting the g-pawn with the king. Black loses because he cannot defend the pawn on g5 with the bishop from d8 or e7. If the black king were on b8, then 1...Ba5 would draw.

=== Sokolov vs. McShane ===
Sokolov vs. McShane, 2002/3

Position: h8 black bishop, e7 black king, h7 white pawn, g6 white king, c5 black pawn, f5 white pawn, h4 white pawn, b3 white bishop

Black to move discards a pawn and sets up a stalemate defense.

Position: e8 black king, h8 black bishop, h7 white pawn, f6 white pawn, g6 white king, h5 white pawn, b3 white bishop

Position after 5...Ke8, draw

In the game between Ivan Sokolov and Luke McShane, Black discards his pawn and goes for a stalemate defense:

1... c4!?
2. Bxc4 Kf8
3. h5 Ke7
4. Bb3 Kf8
5. f6 Ke8 ½–½

and a draw was agreed because White cannot break through, e.g. 6.Ba4+ Kf8 7.h6 Bxf6 8.Kxf6 stalemate.

=== Lautier vs. Rublevsky ===
Lautier vs. Rublevsky, 2003

Position: f7 black pawn, g7 white king, e6 black king, g5 white bishop, f4 white pawn, g4 black bishop, h4 white pawn, g3 white pawn

Black to move

In an endgame with opposite-colored bishops, positional factors may be more important than material (see quotes below). In this position, Black sacrifices a pawn (leaving him three pawns down) to reach a fortress.

1... Kf5!
2. Kxf7 Bh5+
3. Kg7 Bd1
4. Be7 ½–½

After 4...Be2 5.Kh6 Bd1 6.h5 Black just waits by playing 6...Be2.

=== Kotov vs. Botvinnik ===
Kotov vs. Botvinnik, 1955

Position: e6 black bishop, g6 black pawn, c5 white bishop, d5 black pawn, h5 black pawn, f4 white pawn, h4 white pawn, b3 black pawn, c3 white king, e3 white pawn, f3 black king

Black to move

Another position illustrating the principle stated above is from the game Kotov–Botvinnik, Moscow 1955. Grandmaster Lev Alburt writes, "Black has an extra pawn, but his opponent appears to have a reasonable blockade in place." However, Botvinnik finds a way to create another passed pawn.

1... g5!! 2. fxg5

2.hxg5 h4 3.Bd6 Bf5 4.g6 Bxg6 5.f5 Bxf5 6.Kxb3 Kg2 costs White his bishop and the game.

2...d4+!

Black must keep his b-pawn.

3. exd4

Black has gone from being a pawn up to temporarily being a pawn down, but he has a won game. If 3.Bxd4, then 3...Kg3 4.g6 Kxh4 5.Kd2 Kh3!! 6.Bf6 h4 7.Ke2 Kg2!.

3... Kg3!

Not 3...Kg4? 4.d5! Bxd5 5.Bf2, drawing.

4. Ba3

4.g6 Kxh4 5.g7 Kg4 also wins. 4.Be7 Kxh4 5.g6+ Kg4 wins.

4... Kxh4 5. Kd3 Kxg5 6. Ke4 h4 7. Kf3

Or 7.d5 Bxd5+.

7... Bd5+ 0–1

=== Fischer vs. Donner ===
Fischer vs. Donner, 1966

Position: c8 black rook, g8 black king, f7 black pawn, g7 black pawn, h7 black pawn, a6 black pawn, f5 black queen, d4 white pawn, a3 black bishop, d3 white bishop, g3 white pawn, a2 white pawn, c2 white rook, f2 white pawn, h2 white pawn, f1 white queen, g1 white king

Position after 30.Bc4–d3?

In this game between Bobby Fischer and Jan Hein Donner, White was winning, but Black had a swindle to save the game by getting to a drawn opposite-colored bishop endgame. Play continued:

30... Rxc2
31. Bxf5 Rc1
32. Qxc1 Bxc1
33. Kf1 h6

If 33.d5, then 33...Ba3 stops the pawn.

34. Ke2 Kf8 ½–½

If Fischer had won this game, he would have tied with Boris Spassky for first place in the 1966 Piatigorsky Cup tournament.

=== Fischer vs. Polugaevsky ===
Fischer vs. Polugaevsky, 1970

Position: d8 black bishop, a7 black pawn, f7 white bishop, h7 black pawn, g5 black king, g4 white pawn, b2 white pawn, f2 white pawn, g2 white king

White to move, draw agreed

In this position from a game between Fischer and Lev Polugaevsky a pair of rooks had just been exchanged. An endgame with opposite-colored bishops was reached, with three pawns to two, which was a dead draw.

=== Vidmar vs. Maróczy ===
In this 1932 game between Milan Vidmar and Géza Maróczy, White was three pawns ahead, but was unable to win. Pawns are doubled on the rook file, which would give White the wrong rook pawn, making the white bishop unable to assist in promotion. The game ended in a draw on move 129, because checkmate was impossible. Before the end, two insignificant underpromotions to bishops occurred.

Vidmar vs. Maróczy, 1932

Position: h8 black king, f6 black bishop, h6 black pawn, b5 white bishop, h5 white pawn, d3 white pawn, g3 white pawn, h2 white pawn, h1 white king

Position after 41.Bxb5

Position: g8 white bishop, e7 black bishop, h6 black pawn, d5 white pawn, e5 black king, h5 white pawn, g4 white pawn, h4 white pawn, h3 white king

Position after 115...Ke5

== Advantageous with positional considerations ==
As stated above, in endgames with opposite-colored bishops, positional factors may be more important than material differences. John Nunn makes two points:

1. Usually, the number of passed pawns is more important than the total number of pawns.
2. Small changes in the pawn structure may have a large effect.

=== Against weak pawns ===
Bogoljubov vs. Blümich, 1925

Position: c8 black bishop, f8 black king, f7 black pawn, g7 black pawn, a6 black pawn, c6 black pawn, g6 black pawn, c4 white pawn, e4 black pawn, b3 white pawn, e3 white bishop, h3 white pawn, a2 white pawn, f2 white pawn, g2 white pawn, d1 white king

Position after 28...Kf8

In some cases with more pawns on the board, if one side has weak pawns then it is actually advantageous to the other side to have the bishops on opposite colors. In the 1925 game of Efim Bogoljubov versus Max Blümich, White wins because of the bishops being on opposite colors making Black weak on the black squares, the weakness of Black's isolated pawns on the queenside, and the weak doubled pawns on the kingside. The game continued:

29. Kd2 Ke7
30. Kc3 f6
31. Kd4 Be6
32. Kc5 Kd7
33. Kb6 g5
34. Kxa6 Kc7
35. Bb6+ Kc8
36. Bc5 Kc7
37. Bf8 f5
38. Bxg7 f4
39. Bf6 f3
40. gxf3 exf3
41. Bxg5 Bxh3
42. Bf4+ 1–0

=== Positional advantages ===
Fuchs vs. Kholmov, 1956

Position: b7 black pawn, f7 black pawn, a6 black pawn, g6 black pawn, h5 black pawn, d4 white pawn, e4 black king, h4 white pawn, a3 white pawn, e3 white bishop, g3 white pawn, e2 white king, f2 white pawn, g2 black bishop

Black to move wins.

Although endgames with opposite-colored bishops tend to be drawish, even with a material advantage, in some cases positional advantages can be enough to win with the same material on both sides. In this position from a 1956 game between Reinhart Fuchs and Ratmir Kholmov, Black's positional advantages enabled him to win.

Kurajica vs. Karpov, 1976

Position: g8 black king, c7 black pawn, g7 black pawn, c6 black pawn, f6 black pawn, c5 white pawn, d5 black bishop, a4 black pawn, d4 white pawn, h4 black pawn, a3 white bishop, d3 white pawn, f3 white pawn, f2 white king, g2 white pawn, h2 white pawn

Position after 33...h4!

In this 1976 game between Bojan Kurajica and Anatoly Karpov, the material is even but Black has pinned down White's queenside pawns and is preparing to break through. Black needs to create another weakness or passed pawn to win. White resigned after move 57.

== As a defensive resource ==
Occasionally opposite-colored bishops endings offer a defender better prospects for a draw than same-colored bishops endings. The weaker side can set up a color-blockade, so the side with the extra material or exchange cannot attack.

=== Liem vs. Svidler ===
Liem vs. Shirov, 2013

Position: c8 black rook, a7 black pawn, b7 black pawn, d6 black bishop, g6 black king, d5 white pawn, e5 black knight, f5 black pawn, g5 black pawn, c3 white pawn, g3 white pawn, a2 white pawn, g2 white bishop, b1 white king, e1 white rook, h1 white rook

Position after 27...Bd6. Black has established a solid dark-square blockade. Black's centralized pieces cannot be challenged by white's bishop.

=== Smyslov vs. Vaganian ===
Smyslov vs. Vaganian, 1988

Position: c8 black rook, g8 black king, b7 black bishop, f7 black pawn, h7 black pawn, a6 black pawn, b6 black pawn, d6 white bishop, e6 black pawn, g6 black pawn, d5 black knight, e5 white pawn, b4 white pawn, a3 white pawn, h3 white pawn, b2 white queen, f2 white pawn, g2 white pawn, g1 white king

Black has good compensation for the material deficit. The well-entrenched knight in addition to the presence of opposite-colored bishops, makes the task very hard for white to convert his material advantage.

== Additional pieces ==
If both sides have an additional matching piece, the situation is much more complex and cannot be easily codified. Generally, the presence of the additional pieces gives the stronger side more winning chances. Glenn Flear calls these "NQE"s ("Not Quite Endgames"). The initiative is important in these types of endgames.

=== Knight ===
With each side having a knight in addition to the bishops, the main idea is for the stronger side to create two passed pawns. If this can be done then the exchange of knights is acceptable for the stronger side. However, the exchange of knights may benefit the defender, especially if there is only one passed pawn and he has no other weaknesses. This endgame occurs in about 0.6% of games between high-rated players.

=== Rook ===
If each side has a rook in addition to the bishop, the stronger side has far more winning prospects. The attacking rook can have an influence on both colors of squares. Sometimes exchanging the rook for the defender's bishop breaks a fortress. Sometimes the defending bishop can be sacrificed for pawns to result in a rook and bishop versus rook endgame that can be drawn. The most difficult problem encountered by the stronger side is usually in breaking a blockade by the opposite bishop. These endgames occur in 2.8% of the games between high-rated players.

==== Example ====
Topalov vs. Aronian, 2006

Position: a7 black pawn, e7 black king, f7 black pawn, g7 black pawn, h7 black pawn, b6 black pawn, e6 black bishop, d5 black rook, g5 white pawn, c4 black pawn, h4 white pawn, c3 white pawn, e3 white bishop, f3 white pawn, a2 white pawn, b2 white rook, e2 white pawn, f2 white king

Position after 25.Rxd5 Rxd5

Position: d8 white rook, e7 white bishop, f7 white king, h7 black king, a6 black rook, g6 black pawn, c5 white pawn, f5 black bishop, g5 white pawn

Position before 73.Rd4!

This type of endgame was reached in a 2006 game between Veselin Topalov and Levon Aronian, see the first diagram. (The game and analysis is on this page and the game score is also here.) White was able to make slow progress (see the second diagram, showing the position after 72 moves).

The game concluded:

73. Rd4! Be6+
74. Kf8 Ra8+
75. Bd8 Bg4
76. c6 1–0

Black resigned because the pawn will advance to c7 and Black cannot defend against rook attacks on the seventh rank and the h-file.

=== Queen ===
When each side has an additional queen, the stronger side has good winning chances thanks to such themes as checkmate that do not exist in many other endgames. However, the possibility of exchanging queens is a paramount concern. The stronger side should try to get two widely spaced passed pawns before exchanging queens. Defending squares of the color of the stronger side's bishop can be difficult if there are weaknesses or threats on both sides of the board. The stronger side must increase his advantage before exchanging queens and sometimes this is done with a direct attack on the king. These endgames occur in 0.8% of the games between high-rated players.

== History ==
Paulsen vs. Anderssen, London, 1862

Position: h5 black pawn, c4 black pawn, f3 white king, h3 black king, c2 white bishop, d2 black bishop

Position after 54...bxc4, drawn on the 57th move

The earliest opposite-colored bishop endgame in the ChessBase database is an 1862 game between Louis Paulsen and Adolf Anderssen in their unofficial world championship match. It was a draw because of the wrong rook pawn. Play continued:

55. Bf5+ Kh2
56. Bc2 h4
57. Be4 ½–½

NN vs. Greco, 1620

Position: g8 black king, f7 black pawn, g7 black pawn, e6 black pawn, h6 black pawn, b5 black pawn, e5 white pawn, g5 white bishop, f4 white pawn, g2 white pawn, h2 white pawn, b1 black bishop, h1 white king

Position after 32...Bxb1

This 1620 game between an unknown player and Gioachino Greco was won by Black on move 50.

== Quotes ==
- "In endings with bishops of opposite color, material means NOTHING, position EVERYTHING." — Cecil Purdy (emphasis in the original)
