= Stalemate =

Situation in chess without a legal move

Example of stalemate

Position: h8 black king, g6 white queen, a1 white king

Black to move is stalemated. Black is not in check but has no legal move since every square the king might move to is attacked by White's queen.

Stalemate is a situation in chess where the player whose turn it is to move is not in check but has no legal move. Stalemate results in a draw. This is in contrast to checkmate, where a player is in check and has no legal move. During the endgame, stalemate is a resource that can enable the player with the inferior position to draw the game rather than lose. In more complex positions, stalemate is much rarer, usually the result of a swindle that succeeds only if the superior side is inattentive. Stalemate is also a common theme in endgame studies and other chess problems.

The outcome of a stalemate was standardized as a draw in the 19th century. Before this standardization, its treatment varied widely, including being deemed a win for the stalemating player, a half-win for that player, or a loss for that player; not being permitted; and resulting in the stalemated player missing a turn. Stalemate rules vary in variants and other games of the chess family.

== Etymology and usage ==
The first recorded use of stalemate is from 1765. It is a compounding of Middle English stale and mate (meaning checkmate). Stale is probably derived from Anglo-French estale meaning 'standstill', a cognate of "stand" and "stall", both ultimately derived from the Proto-Indo-European root *sta-. The first recorded use in a figurative sense is in 1885.

Stalemate has become a widely used metaphor for other situations where there is a conflict or contest between two parties, such as war or political negotiations, and neither side is able to achieve victory, resulting in what is also called an impasse, a deadlock, or a Mexican standoff. Chess writers note that this usage is a misnomer because, unlike in chess, the situation is often a temporary one that is ultimately resolved, even if it seems currently intractable. The term "stalemate" is sometimes used incorrectly as a generic term for a draw in chess. While draws are common, they are rarely the direct result of stalemate.

== Examples ==
Diagram 1

Position: f8 black king, f7 white pawn, f6 white king

Black to move is stalemated (see King and pawn versus king endgame).
Burn vs. Pilsbury, 1898
Diagram 2

Position: a8 black king, b8 black bishop, h8 white rook, b6 white king

Black to move is stalemated. The bishop has no legal moves because the rook pins it to the king.
Diagram 3

Position: g5 white king, b3 white queen, a2 black pawn, a1 black king

Black to move is stalemated (see Queen versus pawn endgame).
Diagram 4

Position: a8 black king, a7 white pawn, a6 white king, f4 white bishop

Black to move is stalemated (see Wrong bishop, Wrong rook pawn).
Diagram 5

Position: e2 black pawn, g2 black pawn, h2 black pawn, e1 white king, f1 black bishop, g1 black rook, h1 black king

Black to move is stalemated (a deadlock).

With Black to move, Black is stalemated in diagrams 1 to 5. Stalemate is an important factor in the endgame – the endgame setup in diagram 1, for example, quite frequently is relevant in play (see King and pawn versus king endgame). The position in diagram 1 occurred in an 1898 game between Amos Burn and Harry Pillsbury and also in a 1925 game between Savielly Tartakower and Richard Réti. The same position, except shifted to the e-file, occurred in a 2009 game between Gata Kamsky and Vladimir Kramnik.

The position in diagram 3 is an example of a pawn drawing against a queen. Stalemates of this sort can often save a player from losing an apparently hopeless position (see Queen versus pawn endgame).

The position in diagram 5 is a special kind of stalemate, in which no move is possible even if one ignores the need to avoid self-check. George P. Jelliss has called this type of stalemate a deadlock. Adding a white knight on f2 would produce a checklock: a checkmate position where no moves are possible, even if one ignores the need to avoid self-check. In general, positions with no moves at all available (even ignoring the need to avoid self-check) are called locks.

=== Examples from games ===
==== Anand versus Kramnik ====
Anand vs. Kramnik, 2007

Position: g7 black pawn, f6 black pawn, f5 white pawn, h5 white king, e4 black king, h4 white pawn

Before 65...Kxf5, stalemate

In this position from the game Viswanathan Anand–Vladimir Kramnik from the 2007 World Chess Championship, Black played 65...Kxf5, stalemating White. (Any other move by Black loses.)

==== Korchnoi versus Karpov ====
Korchnoi vs. Karpov, 1978

Position: f7 white king, g7 white bishop, h7 black king, a4 black pawn, a3 white pawn

Position after 124.Bc3–g7

An intentional stalemate occurred on the 124th move of the fifth game of the 1978 World Championship match between Viktor Korchnoi and Anatoly Karpov. The game had been a theoretical draw for many moves. White's bishop is useless; it cannot defend the queening square at a8 nor attack the black pawn on the light a4-square. If the white king heads towards the black pawn, the black king can move towards a8 and set up a fortress.

The players were not on speaking terms, however, so neither would offer a draw by agreement. On his 124th move, White played 124.Bg7, delivering stalemate. Korchnoi said that it gave him pleasure to stalemate Karpov and that it was slightly humiliating. Until 2021 (when the record was broken by the decisive 136-move Carlsen–Nepomniachtchi game 6), this was the longest game played in a World Chess Championship final match, as well as the only World Championship game to end in stalemate before 2007.

==== Bernstein versus Smyslov ====
Bernstein vs. Smyslov, 1946

Position: b8 white rook, f5 black king, f4 black pawn, b3 black pawn, h3 black rook, e2 white king

Black to move

Position: f5 black king, f4 black pawn, f3 white king, b2 black rook

Position after 61...Rxb2 (analysis)

Sometimes, a surprise stalemate saves a game. In the game Ossip Bernstein–Vasily Smyslov (first diagram), Black can win by sacrificing the f-pawn and using the king to support the b-pawn. However, Smyslov thought it was good to advance the b-pawn because he could win the white rook with a skewer if it captured the pawn. Play went:

59... b2?? 60. Rxb2!

Now 60...Rh2+ 61.Kf3! Rxb2 would be stalemate (second diagram). Smyslov played 60...Kg4, and the game was drawn after 61.Kf1 (see Rook and pawn versus rook endgame).

==== Matulović versus Minev ====
Matulović vs. Minev, 1956

Position: a6 white pawn, b6 white rook, f5 black king, f3 white pawn, g3 white king, a2 black rook

White to move

Position: a6 white rook, h5 black king, f4 white pawn, h3 white king

Stalemate if White had played 4.Rxa6

Whereas the possibility of stalemate arose in the Bernstein–Smyslov game because of a blunder, it can also arise without one, as in the game Milan Matulović–Nikolay Minev (first diagram). Play continued:

1. Rc6 Kg5 2. Kh3 Kh5 3. f4

The only meaningful attempt to make progress. Now all moves by Black (like 3...Ra3+?) lose, with one exception.

3... Rxa6!

Now 4.Rxa6 would be stalemate. White played 4.Rc5+ instead, and the game was drawn several moves later.

==== Williams versus Harrwitz ====
Williams vs. Harrwitz, 1846

Position: b8 black rook, b4 black knight, f4 black king, a2 black pawn, a1 white king, g1 white rook

Position after 72.Ka1

Position: c4 black king, a3 black rook, b3 white rook, c3 black knight, a2 black pawn, a1 white king

Position after 84.Rb3! If Black takes the rook either way, the result is stalemate.

In the game Elijah Williams–Daniel Harrwitz (first diagram), Black was up a knight and a pawn in an endgame. This would normally be a decisive material advantage, but Black could find no way to make progress because of various stalemate resources available to White. The game continued:

72... Ra8 73. Rc1

Avoiding the threatened 73...Nc2+.

73... Ke3 74. Rc4 Ra4 75. Rc1 Kd2 76. Rc4 Kd3

76...Nc2+ 77.Rxc2+! Kxc2 is stalemate.

77. Rc3+! Kd4

77...Kxc3 is stalemate.

78. Rc1 Ra3 79. Rd1+ Kc5

79...Rd3 80.Rxd3+! leaves Black with either insufficient material to win after 80...Nxd3 81.Kxa2 or a standard fortress in a corner draw after 80...Kxd3.

80. Rc1+ Kb5 81. Rc7 Nd5 82. Rc2 Nc3?? 83. Rb2+ Kc4 84. Rb3! (see second diagram)

Now the players agreed to a draw, since 84...Kxb3 or 84...Rxb3 is stalemate, as is 84...Ra8 85.Rxc3+! Kxc3.

Black could still have won the game until his critical mistake on move 82. Instead of 82...Nc3, 82...Nb4 wins; for example, after 83.Rc8 Re3 84.Rb8+ Kc5 85.Rc8+ Kd5 86.Rd8+ Kc6 87.Ra8 Re1+ 88.Kb2 Kc5 89.Kc3 a1=Q+, Black wins.

==== Carlsen versus Van Wely ====
Position: f8 black rook, d3 black king, e3 black bishop, c2 white rook, d1 white king

White to make his 109th move

This 2007 game, Magnus Carlsen–Loek van Wely, ended in stalemate. White used the second-rank defense in a rook and bishop versus rook endgame for 46 moves. The fifty-move rule was about to come into effect, under which White could claim a draw. The game ended:

109. Rd2+ Bxd2 ½–½

White was stalemated.

=== More complex examples ===
Although stalemate usually occurs in the endgame, it can also occur with more pieces on the board. Outside of relatively simple endgame positions, such as those above, stalemate occurs rarely, usually when the side with the superior position has overlooked the possibility of stalemate. This is typically realized by the inferior side's sacrifice of one or more pieces in order to force stalemate. A piece that is offered as a sacrifice to bring about stalemate is sometimes called a desperado.

==== Evans versus Reshevsky ====
Evans vs. Reshevsky, 1963

Position: c8 white queen, f7 white rook, g7 black pawn, h7 black king, b5 black pawn, e5 black pawn, g5 black queen, h5 black pawn, b4 white pawn, e4 white pawn, f4 black knight, e3 black rook, f3 white pawn, g3 white pawn, h3 white pawn, h2 white king

Position before White's 47th move

Position: g8 black king, g7 white rook, b5 black pawn, e5 black pawn, h5 black pawn, b4 white pawn, e4 white pawn, f4 black knight, h4 white pawn, f3 white pawn, g3 black queen, e2 black rook, h1 white king

Position after 50.Rxg7+!, the eternal rook

One of the best-known examples of the desperado is the game Larry Evans–Samuel Reshevsky that was dubbed "The Swindle of the Century". Evans sacrificed his queen on move 49 and offered his rook on move 50. White's rook has been called the eternal rook. Capturing it results in stalemate, but otherwise it stays on the seventh rank and checks Black's king ad infinitum (i.e. perpetual check). The game would inevitably end in a draw by agreement, by threefold repetition, or by an eventual claim under the fifty-move rule.

47. h4! Re2+ 48. Kh1 Qxg3??

After 48...Qg6! 49.Rf8 Qe6! 50.Rh8+ Kg6, Black remains a piece ahead after 51.Qxe6 Nxe6, or forces mate after 51.gxf4 Re1+ and 52...Qa2+.

49. Qg8+! Kxg8 50. Rxg7+!

==== Gelfand versus Kramnik ====
Gelfand vs. Kramnik, 1994

Position: c8 black queen, d8 black rook, e7 white rook, g7 black pawn, h7 black king, a6 black pawn, b6 white queen, f6 black pawn, h6 black pawn, a5 white pawn, f5 white pawn, h5 white pawn, d4 white pawn, g4 white pawn, f3 white pawn, h3 white king

Position after 67.Re7

Position: d8 white queen, e7 white rook, g7 black pawn, h7 black king, a6 black pawn, f6 black pawn, h6 black pawn, a5 white pawn, f5 white pawn, h5 white pawn, d4 white pawn, g4 white pawn, f3 white pawn, h2 white king

Possible stalemate

The position at right occurred in Boris Gelfand–Vladimir Kramnik, 1994 FIDE Candidates match, game 6, in Sanghi Nagar, India. Kramnik, down two pawns and on the defensive, would be very happy with a draw. Gelfand has just played 67. Re4–e7? (first diagram), a strong-looking move that threatens 68.Qxf6, winning a third pawn, or 68.Rc7, further constricting Black. Black responded 67... Qc1! If White takes Black's undefended rook with 68.Qxd8, Black's desperado queen forces the draw with 68...Qh1+ 69.Kg3 Qh2+!, compelling 70.Kxh2 stalemate (second diagram). If White avoids the stalemate with 68.Rxg7+ Kxg7 69.Qxd8, Black draws by perpetual check with 69...Qh1+ 70.Kg3 Qg1+ 71.Kf4 Qc1+! 72.Ke4 Qc6+! 73.Kd3!? (73.d5 Qc4+; 73.Qd5 Qc2+) Qxf3+! 74.Kd2 Qg2+! 75.Kc3 Qc6+ 76.Kb4 Qb5+ 77.Ka3 Qd3+. Gelfand played 68. d5 instead but still only drew.

==== Troitsky versus Vogt ====
Troitsky vs. Vogt, 1896

Position: c8 black king, d8 black rook, b7 black pawn, c7 black pawn, d7 black bishop, f7 black pawn, g7 black pawn, b6 black bishop, g6 black rook, a5 black pawn, b5 white pawn, e5 black pawn, a4 white pawn, e4 white pawn, f3 black queen, g3 white knight, c2 white queen, f2 white pawn, h2 white pawn, c1 white rook, e1 white bishop, g1 white king, h1 white rook

White, on move, sets a trap with 1.Rd1!

Position: d8 black king, b7 black pawn, c7 black pawn, f7 black pawn, g7 black pawn, b6 black bishop, g6 black rook, a5 black pawn, b5 white pawn, e5 black pawn, a4 white pawn, e4 white pawn, g3 white knight, h3 black bishop, f2 white pawn, h2 white pawn, d1 black queen, e1 white bishop, g1 white king, h1 white rook

Position after 3...Qxd1, stalemate

In Troitsky–Vogt, 1896, the famous endgame study composer Alexey Troitsky pulled off an elegant swindle in actual play. After Troitsky's 1. Rd1!, Black fell into the trap with the seemingly crushing 1... Bh3?, threatening 2...Qg2#. The game concluded 2. Rxd8+ Kxd8 3. Qd1+! Qxd1 stalemate. White's bishop, knight, and f-pawn are all pinned and unable to move.

== In studies ==
Rhine, 2006

Position: c8 white king, h8 white queen, b6 black queen, c6 black king, d6 black bishop, g6 black bishop, c5 black knight, c4 black pawn, h4 white rook, d3 white knight, e3 white knight, b2 black knight, b1 white rook

White to play and draw

Position: d8 white king, e8 black bishop, b6 black knight, d6 black king, c5 black knight

Incredibly, the possibility of stalemate allows White, three pieces down, to draw.

Stalemate is a frequent theme in endgame studies and other chess compositions. An example is the "White to Play and Draw" study at right, composed by the American master Frederick Rhine and published in 2006. White saves a draw with 1. Ne5+! Black wins after 1.Nb4+? Kb5! or 1.Qe8+? Bxe8 2.Ne5+ Kb5! 3.Rxb2+ Nb3. 1... Bxe5 After 1...Kb5? 2.Rxb2+ Nb3 3.Rxc4! Qxe3 (best; 3...Qb8+ 4.Kd7 Qxh8 5.Rxb3+ forces checkmate) 4.Rxb3+! Qxb3 5.Qh1! Bf5+ 6.Kd8!, White is winning. 2. Qe8+! 2.Qxe5? Qb7+ 3.Kd8 Qd7#. 2... Bxe8 3. Rh6+ Bd6 3...Kb5 4.Rxb6+ Kxb6 5.Nxc4+ also leads to a drawn endgame. Not 5.Rxb2+? Bxb2 6.Nc4+ Kb5 7.Nxb2 Bh5! trapping White's knight. 4. Rxd6+! Kxd6 5. Nxc4+! Nxc4 6. Rxb6+ Nxb6+ Moving the king is actually a better try, but the resulting endgame of two knights and a bishop against a rook is a well-established theoretical draw. 7. Kd8! (rightmost diagram) Black is three pieces ahead, but if White is allowed to take the bishop, the two knights are insufficient to force checkmate. The only way to save the bishop is to move it, resulting in stalemate. A similar idea occasionally enables the inferior side to save a draw in the ending of bishop, knight, and king versus lone king.

Roycroft, 1957

Position: e8 black rook, f8 black queen, g8 black rook, h8 black knight, b7 black pawn, e7 black pawn, f7 black pawn, g7 black bishop, h7 white king, b6 black pawn, c6 white pawn, d6 black pawn, f6 black pawn, g6 black pawn, h6 black knight, a2 black bishop, b2 black pawn, b1 black king

White to play and draw

Position: e8 black rook, f8 black queen, g8 black rook, h8 black knight, b7 black pawn, e7 black pawn, f7 black pawn, g7 black bishop, h7 white king, b6 black pawn, d6 black pawn, f6 black pawn, h6 black knight, g5 black pawn, c4 black bishop, b2 black pawn, c2 white rook, d2 black king

Final position

At right is a composition by A. J. Roycroft which was published in the British Chess Magazine in 1957. White draws with 1. c7! after which there are two main lines:

- 1... f5 2. c8=Q (if 2.c8=R? then 2...Bc3 3.Rxc3 Qg7#) 2... Bc3 3. Qxf5+ draws by stalemate.
- 1... g5 (1...Ka1 2.c8=R transposes) 2. c8=R!! (2.c8=Q? Ka1 3.Qc2 [or 3.Qc1+] b1=Q+ wins) 2... Ka1 (2...Ng6 3.Rc1+ forces Black to capture, stalemating White) 3. Rc2!! (not 3.Rc1+?? b1=Q+! 4.Rxb1+ Bxb1#; now White threatens 4.Rxb2 and 5.Rxa2+, forcing stalemate or perpetual check) 3... Bc4 (trying to get in a check; 3...b1=Q, 3...b1=B, and 3...Bb1 are all stalemate; 3...Ng6 4.Rc1+!) 4. Rc1+ Ka2 5. Ra1+ Kb3 6. Ra3+ Kc2 7. Rc3+ Kd2 8. Rc2+ (rightmost diagram). As in Evans–Reshevsky, Black cannot escape the "eternal rook".

== In problems ==
Sam Loyd

Position: f8 black bishop, g8 black knight, h8 black rook, e7 black pawn, g7 black pawn, h7 black queen, e6 white queen, f6 black pawn, g6 black king, h6 black rook, h5 black pawn, h4 white pawn, e3 white pawn, a2 white pawn, b2 white pawn, c2 white pawn, d2 white pawn, f2 white pawn, g2 white pawn, a1 white rook, b1 white knight, c1 white bishop, e1 white king, f1 white bishop, g1 white knight, h1 white rook

Shortest stalemate

Position: a8 black rook, b8 black knight, e8 black king, g8 black knight, h8 black rook, a7 black pawn, b7 black pawn, g7 black pawn, h7 black pawn, d6 black pawn, a5 black queen, c5 black pawn, d5 white pawn, a4 white pawn, c4 white pawn, f4 black pawn, h4 black bishop, b3 black bishop, e3 black pawn, f3 white pawn, g3 white rook, h3 white pawn, b2 white pawn, d2 white knight, e2 white pawn, g2 white pawn, h2 white queen, c1 white bishop, e1 white king, f1 white bishop, g1 white knight, h1 white rook

Stalemate with all pieces on board

Some chess problems require "White to move and stalemate Black in n moves" (rather than the more common "White to move and checkmate Black in n moves"). Problemists have also tried to construct the shortest possible game ending in stalemate. Sam Loyd devised one just ten moves long: 1.e3 a5 2.Qh5 Ra6 3.Qxa5 h5 4.Qxc7 Rah6 5.h4 f6 6.Qxd7+ Kf7 7.Qxb7 Qd3 8.Qxb8 Qh7 9.Qxc8 Kg6 10.Qe6 (first diagram). A similar stalemate is reached after: 1.d4 c5 2.dxc5 f6 3.Qxd7+ Kf7 4.Qxd8 Bf5 5.Qxb8 h5 6.Qxa8 Rh6 7.Qxb7 a6 8.Qxa6 Bh7 9.h4 Kg6 10.Qe6 (Frederick Rhine).

Loyd also demonstrated that stalemate can occur with all the pieces on the board: 1.d4 d6 2.Qd2 e5 3.a4 e4 4.Qf4 f5 5.h3 Be7 6.Qh2 Be6 7.Ra3 c5 8.Rg3 Qa5+ 9.Nd2 Bh4 10.f3 Bb3 11.d5 e3 12.c4 f4 (second diagram). Games such as this are occasionally played in tournaments as a pre-arranged draw.

=== Double stalemate ===
Position: a8 white knight, b8 white bishop, c8 black king, a7 white pawn, b7 black pawn, c7 white pawn, e7 black pawn, b6 white pawn, e6 white pawn, d3 black pawn, f3 black pawn, d2 white pawn, e2 black pawn, f2 white pawn, g2 black pawn, h2 black pawn, e1 white king, f1 black bishop, g1 black rook, h1 black queen

Double stalemate position

Position: b7 black pawn, a6 black bishop, b6 black pawn, a5 black rook, b5 black pawn, a4 black queen, b4 black pawn, a3 black king, b3 black pawn, b2 black pawn, b1 white king

Another double stalemate

There are chess compositions featuring double stalemate. To the right are two double stalemate positions, in which neither side has a legal move. An example from actual play is given below:

Position: g8 black king, a7 black pawn, c7 black pawn, e7 black pawn, f7 black pawn, g7 white pawn, f6 black bishop, h6 white king, d5 white knight, f5 white pawn, h5 white pawn, g4 white knight, h4 black queen, a2 white pawn, c2 white pawn

Friedrich Amelung vs. Gregor von Helmersen, Viljandi, July 1860

White played

1. Ngxf6+ Qxf6+

If 1...exf6, then 2.Ne7#.

2. Nxf6+ exf6 3. c4 c5 4. a4 a5

Leaving a double stalemate position. 1.Ndxf6+ would not have worked, for then 1...exf6 is possible. (Under the present rules, the game would have ended after 1...Qxf6+, as the position is then dead: no sequence of legal moves leads to either side being checkmated.)

Position: c5 black pawn, f5 black pawn, h5 black pawn, c4 white pawn, f4 white pawn, h4 black king, e3 black pawn, f3 white pawn, h3 white pawn, e2 white pawn, g2 white king, h2 white pawn, f1 white bishop, g1 white knight, h1 white rook

Fastest known double stalemate: after 18...dxe3

The fastest known game ending in a double stalemate position was discovered by Enzo Minerva and published in the Italian newspaper l'Unità on 14 August 2007:

1.c4 d5 2.Qb3 Bh3 3.gxh3 f5 4.Qxb7 Kf7 5.Qxa7 Kg6 6.f3 c5 7.Qxe7 Rxa2 8.Kf2 Rxb2 9.Qxg7+ Kh5 10.Qxg8 Rxb1 11.Rxb1 Kh4 12.Qxh8 h5 13.Qh6 Bxh6 14.Rxb8 Be3+ 15.dxe3 Qxb8 16.Kg2 Qf4 17.exf4 d4 18.Be3 dxe3

== History of the stalemate rule ==
The stalemate rule has had a convoluted history. Although stalemate is universally recognized as a draw today, that was not the case for much of the game's history. In the forerunners to modern chess, such as chaturanga, delivering stalemate resulted in a loss. This was changed in shatranj, however, where stalemating was a win. This practice persisted in chess as played in early 15th-century Spain. Lucena (c. 1497), however, treated stalemate as an inferior form of victory; it won only half the stake in games played for money, and this continued to be the case in Spain as late as 1600. From about 1600 to 1800, the rule in England was that stalemate was a loss for the player administering it, a rule that the eminent chess historian H. J. R. Murray believes may have been adopted from Russian chess. That rule disappeared in England before 1820, being replaced by the French and Italian rule that a stalemate was a drawn game.

Throughout history, a stalemate has at various times been:

- A win for the stalemating player in 10th century Arabia and parts of medieval Europe.
- A half-win for the stalemating player. In a game played for stakes, the stalemating player would win half the stake (18th century Spain).
- A win for the stalemated player in 9th century India, 17th century Russia, on the Central Plain of Europe in the 17th century, and 17th–18th century England. This rule continued to be published in Hoyle's Games Improved as late as 1866.
- Illegal. If White made a move that would stalemate Black, he had to retract it and make a different move (Eastern Asia until the early 20th century). Murray likewise wrote that in Hindustani chess and Parsi chess, two of the three principal forms of chess played in India as of 1913, a player was not allowed to play a move that would stalemate the opponent. The same was true of Burmese chess, another chess variant, at the time of writing. Stalemate was not permitted in most of the Eastern Asiatic forms of the game (specifically in Burma, India, Japan, and Siam) until early in the 20th century.
- The forfeiture of the stalemated player's turn to move (medieval France), although other medieval French sources treat stalemate as a draw.
- A draw. This was the rule in 13th-century Italy and also stated in the German Cracow Poem (1422), that noted, however, that some players treated stalemate as equivalent to checkmate. This rule was ultimately adopted throughout Europe, but not in England until the 19th century, after being introduced there by Jacob Sarratt.

== Proposed rule change ==
Periodically, writers have argued that stalemate should again be made a win for the side causing the stalemate, on the grounds that the goal of chess is conceptually to capture the king and checkmate merely ends it when this is inevitable. Grandmaster Larry Kaufman writes, "In my view, calling stalemate a draw is totally illogical, since it represents the ultimate zugzwang, where any move would get your king taken". The British master T. H. Tylor argued in a 1940 article in the British Chess Magazine that the present rule, treating stalemate as a draw, "is without historical foundation and irrational, and primarily responsible for a vast percentage of draws, and hence should be abolished". Years later, Fred Reinfeld wrote, "When Tylor wrote his attack on the stalemate rule, he released about his unhappy head a swarm of peevish maledictions that are still buzzing." Larry Evans calls the proposal to make stalemate a win for the stalemating player a "crude proposal that ... would radically alter centuries of tradition and make chess boring".

This rule change would cause a greater emphasis on material; an extra pawn would be a greater advantage than it is today. However, Kaufman tested the idea of scoring stalemates higher than draws with the chess engine Komodo, and found that the impact is quite small because it is rare to be able to force stalemate but not checkmate: while all king and pawn versus king endgames become wins when the pawn is protected (except when the attacking king is trapped in front of its own rook pawn), this does not turn out to be common enough. The problem is that king and lone minor piece against king cannot force stalemate in general. Emanuel Lasker and Richard Réti proposed that both stalemate and king and minor versus king (with the minor piece side to move) should give ¾ points to the superior side: this would effectively restore not only the old stalemate rule but also the old bare king rule. Kaufman and correspondence grandmaster Arno Nickel have proposed going even further, and giving only ¼ point as well to the side that brings about a threefold repetition (which likewise has precedents in xiangqi, shogi, and Go). According to his tests with Komodo, chess at the level of a human World Championship match would have a draw rate of 65.6%; scoring stalemate as ¾–¼ reduces the draw rate to 63.4%; scoring stalemate and bare king as ¾–¼ brings it to 55.9%; and scoring stalemate, bare king, and threefold repetition as ¾–¼ brings it all the way down to 22.6%. (The same reduction of draws would occur if stalemate, bare king, and threefold repetition were scored as 1–0 instead of ¾–¼, but the point of the ¾–¼ scoring is to allow the weaker side to still benefit from avoiding checkmate, while giving the stronger side something to play for even when checkmate cannot be attained.)

Position: e4 white knight, e2 black pawn, g2 black pawn, h2 black pawn, e1 white king, f1 black bishop, g1 black rook, h1 black king

Checklock: 1.Nf2# is a win (by checkmate) for White under normal rules; but if the winning condition were changed to capturing the king, it is a draw (by lock) as Black is unable to move.

Jelliss has suggested that under the logic that stalemate should be a win since any move would allow the king to be taken on the next move, checklock (checkmate where the opponent is locked) should be a draw. In a checklock position (see diagram at right), no move would be possible even if exposing the king to check were valid, so the game would stop and the king would not get captured. The same logic would apply to deadlock.

=== Effect on endgame theory ===
If stalemate were a loss for the player unable to move, the outcome of some endgames would be affected. In some situations the superior side can force stalemate but not checkmate. In others, the defending player can use stalemate as a defensive technique to avoid losing (under the current rule):

Position: a8 black rook, e7 black king, g7 white king, h7 white pawn

Black to play
- The endgame of king and pawn versus king would always be a win when the pawn can be protected (except in the singular case of a king trapped in front of its own rook pawn, which is diagram 1 below). In all other cases, either the pawn can be promoted or the defending king can be forced into a stalemate (see diagram 2 below).
  - An unusual position is given to the right; it is a draw under orthodox rules, but if stalemate is deemed to be a win, then Black to play wins by 1...Rh8! (Taking the rook gets White stalemated after 2.Kxh8 Kf7 or 2...Kf8, and if White refuses the sacrifice, Black can force White to abandon the pawn with 2.Kg6 Kf8 3.Kh6 Kf7 or 2.Kh6 Kf7, leaving a basic checkmate.)
- Two knights and a king can force stalemate against a lone king (Hooper & Whyld 1992:32) (See Two knights endgame).
- A rook pawn plus a bishop on the color opposite the pawn's queening square would be a win instead of a draw, because the defending king can be forced into stalemate (see diagram 3 below). (See Wrong rook pawn).
- If the defending king is cornered, a single bishop or knight may be able to stalemate the king, although these cannot be forced in general.
- The defensive drawing techniques with a bishop pawn or rook pawn on the seventh rank with its king nearby versus a queen would not work, because they rely on stalemate. (See Queen versus pawn endgame.)
- Positions such as the Saavedra position, which would normally require an underpromotion due to the fact that a queen would stalemate the opponent, no longer require an underpromotion. (In fact, underpromotion to rook or bishop would no longer be necessary in chess.)

Diagram 1

Position: f7 black king, h7 white king, h6 white pawn

White to move, draw even with a change in stalemate rule
Diagram 2

Position: c8 black king, c7 white pawn, c6 white king

Black to move, stalemate
Diagram 3

Position: a8 black king, a7 white pawn, b6 white king, d6 white bishop

Black to move, stalemate

The effect if stalemates were to be scored as ¾–¼ would be similar but less severe, as then the weaker side would still be rewarded somewhat for avoiding checkmate via stalemate, just not as much as before.

== Rules in other chess variants ==
Not all variants of chess consider the stalemate to be a draw. Many regional variants, as well some variants of Western chess, have adopted their own rules on how to treat the stalemated player. In chaturanga, which is widely considered to be the common ancestor of all variants of chess, a stalemate was a win for the stalemated player. Around the 7th century, this game was adopted in the Middle East as shatranj with very similar rules to its predecessor; however, the stalemate rule was changed to its exact opposite: i.e. it was a win for the player delivering the stalemate. This game was in turn introduced to the Western world, where it would eventually evolve to modern-day Western chess, although the stalemate rule for Western chess was not standardized as a draw until the 19th century (see history of the rule).

=== Modern Asian variants ===
Chaturanga also evolved into several other games in various regions of Asia, all of which have varying rules on stalemating:

- In makruk (Thai chess), a stalemate results in a draw, like in Western chess.
- In shogi (Japanese chess), illegal moves result in losing the game. Thus a position with no legal moves results in a loss, as occurred in the 24th World Computer Shogi Championship.
  - In the larger historical shogi variants without drops (e.g. chu shogi and dai shogi), stalemate is a loss for the stalemated player.
- In xiangqi (Chinese chess) it results in an immediate loss for the stalemated player, and there is no explicit distinction between it and checkmate.
- In janggi (Korean chess), uniquely among modern chess variants, players are allowed to pass their turn at any time. Consequently, there are no stalemates, only positions in which the only legal move is to pass. (In fact, Korean chess does not even have draws, and is the only competitively played version of chess where that is the case: under the official South Korean tournament rules, in positions that would otherwise be draws, points are tallied up for the pieces and pawns remaining on the board, with the player moving second being given 1.5 points to compensate for the first-move advantage. Since every piece and pawn is given an integer number of points, the result can never be a draw.)
- In sittuyin (Myanmar/Burmese chess), stalemates are avoided altogether, as delivering them is illegal. Players are not allowed to leave the opponent with no legal moves without putting the king into check.
- In shatar (Mongolian chess), stalemate is a loss for the stalemated player, like in xiangqi and shogi. Jean-Louis Cazaux and Rick Knowlton explain it as follows: "the loss of liberty is considered equal to death by the Mongolian nomadic culture".

=== Western chess variants ===
The majority of variants of Western chess do not specify any alterations to the rule of stalemate. There are some variants, however, where the rule is specified to differ from that of standard chess:

- In losing chess, the stalemate rule varies depending on the version being played. According to the "international" rules, a stalemate is simply a win for the stalemated player. The Free Internet Chess Server, however, grants a win to the player with fewer pieces remaining on the board (regardless of who delivered the stalemate); if both players have the same number of pieces it is a draw. There is also a "joint" FICS/international rule, according to which a stalemate is only a win if both sources agree that it is a win (i.e. it counts as a win for the stalemated player if that player also happens to have fewer pieces remaining); in all other cases it is a draw.
- In Gliński's hexagonal chess, stalemate is neither a draw nor a full win. Instead, in tournament games, the player who delivers the stalemate earns ¾ point, while the stalemated player receives ¼ point.

== See also ==
- Checkmate
- Desperado
- Draw (chess)
- Glossary of chess
- Rules of chess
- Swindle (chess)
