= Fortress (chess) =

Defensive technique in chess

In chess, a fortress is an endgame drawing technique in which the side behind in material sets up a zone of protection that the opponent cannot penetrate. This might involve keeping the enemy king out of one's position, or a safe zone the enemy cannot force one out of (e.g. see the opposite-colored bishops example). An elementary fortress is a theoretically drawn position (i.e. a book draw) with reduced material in which a passive defense will maintain the draw.

Fortresses commonly have the following characteristics:

1. Useful pawn breakthroughs are not possible.
2. If the stronger side has pawns, they are firmly blocked.
3. The stronger side's king cannot penetrate because it is either cut off or near the edge of the board.
4. Zugzwang positions cannot be forced because the defender has waiting moves available.

Fortresses pose a problem for computer chess: computers fail to recognize fortress-type positions (unless using a suitable endgame tablebase) and incorrectly claim a winning advantage in them.

== Fortress in a corner ==
Position: a8 black king, a6 white pawn, b6 white king, e1 white bishop

Bishop and wrong rook pawn: draw

Position: a7 white pawn, b7 black king, c6 white knight, e6 white king

Knight protecting rook pawn on the seventh rank: draw

Perhaps the most common type of fortress, often seen in endgames with only a few pieces on the board, is where the defending king is able to take refuge in a corner of the board and cannot be forced away or checkmated by the superior side. These two diagrams furnish two classic examples. In both cases, Black simply shuffles their king between a8 and the available square adjacent to a8 (a7, b7, or b8, depending on the position of the white king and pawn). White has no way to dislodge Black's king, and can do no better than a draw by stalemate or some other means.

Note that the bishop and wrong rook pawn ending (i.e. where the pawn is a rook pawn whose promotion square is the color opposite to that of the bishop) in the diagram is a draw even if the pawn is on the seventh rank or further back on the a-file. Heading for a bishop and wrong rook pawn ending is a fairly common drawing resource available to the inferior side.

The knight and rook pawn position in the diagram, however, is a draw only if White's pawn is already on the seventh rank, making this drawing resource available to the defender much less frequently. White wins if the pawn is not yet on the seventh rank and is protected by the knight from behind. With the pawn on the seventh rank, Black has a stalemate defense with their king in the corner.

Position: g8 black king, c7 black rook, d6 black pawn, e6 white king, h6 white queen, e5 black bishop, g5 white pawn

Bishop, rook and king protect f7, g7, h7: draw

=== Example game: Serper vs. Nakamura, 2004 ===
Serper vs. Nakamura

Position: d5 black king, g5 black pawn, e4 black pawn, c3 black bishop, e3 white pawn, g3 black pawn, h3 white pawn, e2 white king, f2 white knight, g2 white pawn

White to play

Position: e5 black bishop, g5 black pawn, g3 black pawn, h3 white pawn, g2 white pawn, e1 black king, h1 white king

Black to play. White has achieved a fortress.

A fortress is often achieved by a sacrifice, such as of a piece for a pawn. In the game between Gregory Serper and Hikaru Nakamura, in the 2004 U.S. Chess Championship, White would lose after 1.Nd1 Kc4 or 1.Nh1 Be5 or 1.Ng4 Bg7. Instead he played

1. Nxe4! Kxe4
2. Kf1!

Heading for h1. After another 10 moves the position in the second diagram was reached. Black has no way of forcing White's king away from the corner, so he played

12... Kf2

and after 13.h4 gxh4 the game was drawn by stalemate.

=== Back-rank defense ===
Position: b8 black rook, g8 black king, a7 white rook, g6 white pawn, h6 white king

The back-rank defense in rook and pawn versus rook endings: another type of fortress in a corner

The back-rank defense in some rook and pawn versus rook endgames is another type of fortress in a corner (see diagram). The defender perches their king on the pawn's queening square, and keeps their rook on the back rank (on the "long side" of the king, not, e.g., on h8 in the diagram position) to guard against horizontal checks. If 1.Rg7+ in the diagram position, Black heads into the corner with 1...Kh8! Note that this defense works only against rook pawns and knight pawns.

=== Rook vs. bishop ===
Seirawan, 2003

Position: c8 white rook, g8 black bishop, h8 black king, h6 white king

Rook versus bishop, with the defending king in the "safe" corner. White to move, draw.

In the ending of a rook versus a bishop, the defender can form a fortress in the "safe" corner—the corner that is not of the color on which the bishop resides (see diagram). White must release the potential stalemate, but they cannot improve their position.

1. Rc3 Ba2
2. Rc2 Bb3
3. Rc7 Bg8

=== Pawn and bishop ===
de la Villa, 2008

Position: b7 black bishop, e3 black king, g3 black pawn, g2 white pawn, f1 white king

Draw with bishop on either color if the white king does not leave the corner

In this position from de la Villa, White draws if their king does not leave the corner. It is also a draw if the bishop is on the other color, so it is not a case of the wrong bishop.

== Rook and pawn versus queen ==
Van der Poel vs. Smits, 2000

Position: g8 white queen, d7 black king, e7 black pawn, f6 black rook, e5 white king

The basic fortress with rook and pawn on the second rank versus a queen

In the diagram, Black draws by moving his rook back and forth between the d6- and f6-squares, or moves his king when checked, staying behind the rook and next to the pawn. This fortress works when all of these conditions are met:

- The pawn is still on its second rank.
- The pawn is on files b through g.
- The pawn is protecting its rook on the third rank.
- The opposing king is beyond the defender's third rank.
- The defending king protects its pawn.

The white king is not able to cross the rank of the black rook, and the white queen is unable to do anything useful.

1. Qd5+ Rd6
2. Qb5+ Kd8
3. Qb8+ Kd7
4. Qb5+ ½–½

Position: a7 black cross, b7 black cross, c7 black cross, d7 black cross, e7 black cross, f7 black cross, g7 black cross, h7 black cross, b6 black cross, c6 black cross, d6 black cross, e6 black cross, f6 black cross, g6 black cross, b5 black cross, g5 black cross, b4 black cross, g4 black cross, a3 black cross, b3 black cross, g3 black cross, h3 black cross, b2 black cross, c2 black cross, d2 black cross, e2 black cross, f2 black cross, g2 black cross

Drawing places of a white pawn, from White's perspective

Positions such as these (when the defending rook and king are near the pawn and the opposing king cannot attack from behind) are drawn when (see diagram):

- the pawn is on the c-, d-, e-, or f-file and the second, sixth, or seventh rank
- the pawn is anywhere on the b- or g-file
- the pawn is on the a- or h-file and the third or seventh rank.

Otherwise, the queen wins.

=== Example from game ===
Marcotulli vs. Malström, 2001

Position: h8 white queen, c7 black rook, e6 white king, b5 black pawn, b3 black king

Black can reach a drawing fortress.

In this position, with Black to move, Black can reach a drawing fortress.

1...b4
2. Kd6 Rc3
3. Kd7

and now 3...Ka3 and several other moves reach the fortress. In the actual game, Black made the weak move 3...Rd3+? and lost.

=== Similar example ===
Whitaker vs. Ferriz, 1959

Position: a5 black queen, f5 black king, h5 black pawn, e3 white rook, g2 white pawn, h2 white king

Position after 50.Re3

In this 1959 game between Whitaker and Ferriz, White sacrificed a rook for a knight in order to exchange a pair of pawns and reach this position, and announced that it was a draw because (1) the queen cannot mate alone, and (2) the black king and pawn cannot approach to help. However, endgame tablebase analysis shows Black to have a forced win in 19 moves starting with 50...Qc7+ (the only winning move), taking advantage of the fact that the rook is currently unprotected – again illustrating how tablebases are refining traditional endgame theory.

=== Example with more pawns ===
Salov vs. Korchnoi, 1997

Position: f7 black pawn, h7 black king, h6 black pawn, f5 white rook, g4 white pawn, f3 white pawn, e1 black queen, g1 white king

Even with equal pawns, Korchnoi could not break through Salov's fifth-rank defense. Though, tablebase analysis shows that there is a forced win for Black with perfect play.

From the diagram, in Salov–Korchnoi, Wijk aan Zee 1997, White was able to hold a draw with a rook versus a queen, even with the sides having an equal number of pawns. He kept his rook on the fifth rank blocking in Black's king, and was careful not to lose his rook to a fork or allow a queen sacrifice for the rook in circumstances where that would win for Black. The players agreed to a draw after:

48. Kg2 Kg6 49. Rh5 Qe2+ 50. Kg3 Qf1 51. Kf4 Qe1 52. Rd5 Qc1+ 53. Kg3 Qc7+ 54. Kg2 Qf4 55. Rh5 Kf6 56. Rd5 Ke6 57. Rh5 Qd2+ 58. Kg3 f6 59. Rf5 Qc1 60. Rh5 Qg1+ 61. Kf4 Qe1 62. Rb5 Qc1+ 63. Kg3 Qg1+ 64. Kf4 Qh2+ 65. Ke3 Kf7 66. Rh5 Qg1+ 67. Kf4 Kg6 68. Rd5 Qh2+ 69. Ke3 Kf7 70. Rh5 Qg1+ 71. Kf4 Ke6 72. Rb5 Qh2+ 73. Ke3 Kd6 74. Rf5 Qb2 75. Rh5 Ke6 76. Kf4 Qc3 77. Kg3 Qc7+ 78. Kg2 Qf7 79. Rb5 Qe8 80. Rf5 Qg6 81. Rb5 ½–½

== Opposite-colored bishops ==
Position: c7 black king, e6 white bishop, f6 black pawn, c5 black bishop, e5 black pawn, g5 black pawn, e4 white king, h4 black pawn, h3 white pawn

Drawing fortress with bishops on opposite colors, Black to move

In endings with bishops of opposite colors (i.e. where one player has a bishop that moves on light squares, while the other player's bishop moves on dark squares), it is often possible to establish a fortress, and thus hold a draw, when one player is one, two, or occasionally even three pawns behind. A typical example is seen in the diagram. White, although three pawns behind, has established a drawing fortress, since Black has no way to contest White's stranglehold over the light squares. White simply keeps his bishop on the h3–c8 diagonal.

=== Example from game ===
Lautier vs. Rublevsky, 2003

Position: f7 black pawn, g7 white king, e6 black king, g5 white bishop, f4 white pawn, g4 black bishop, h4 white pawn, g3 white pawn

Black to move gives up a pawn to set up a fortress.

In an endgame with opposite-colored bishops, positional factors may be more important than material. In this position, Black sacrifices a pawn (leaving him three pawns down) to reach a fortress.

1... Kf5!
2. Kxf7 Bh5+
3. Kg7 Bd1
4. Be7 ½-½

After 4...Be2 5.Kh6 Bd1 6.h5 Black just waits by playing 6...Be2.

== Queen versus two minor pieces ==
Here are drawing fortresses with two minor pieces versus a queen. Usually the defending side will not be able to get to one of these positions.

=== Bishop and knight ===
Position: a8 black king, b7 black bishop, d6 white queen, c5 white king, d5 black knight

Drawing fortress (in either corner that the bishop controls)

The bishop and knight fortress is another type of fortress in a corner. If necessary, the king can move to one of the squares adjacent to the corner, and the bishop can retreat to the corner. This gives the inferior side enough tempo moves to avoid zugzwang. For example:

1. Kb5 Ka7
2. Qd8 Ba8
3. Ka5 Bb7

=== Two bishops ===
Lolli, 1763

Position: b7 black king, b6 black bishop, c6 black bishop, e6 white queen, b4 white king

Drawing fortress (in any corner), the Lolli position

In the two bishop versus queen ending, the queen wins if the Lolli position is not reached, but some of them take up to seventy-one moves to either checkmate or win a bishop, so the fifty-move rule comes into play. From the diagram:

1. Qe7+ Kc8
2. Qe6+ Kb7
3. Qd6 Ba7
4. Qe7+ Kb6!
5. Qd8+ Kb7!
6. Ka5 Bc5!

and White cannot prevent ...Bb6, which gets back to the Lolli position.

=== Two knights ===
Position: e6 black knight, f6 black knight, e5 black king, e3 white king, a2 white queen

Drawing fortress

In the two knights fortress, the knights are next to each other and their king should be between them and the attacking king. The defender must play accurately, though.

Lolli, 1763

Position: d5 white queen, b4 black knight, c4 black knight, c3 black king, f3 white king

Draw

There are several drawing positions with two knights against a queen. The best way is to have the knights adjacent to each other on a file or rank, with their king between them and the enemy king. This is not a true fortress since it is not static. The position of the knights may have to change depending on the opponent's moves. In this position (Lolli, 1763),

1. Qd1 Nd2+
2. Ke2 Nb3

and Black has an ideal defensive position.

Position: e7 black knight, a6 black cross, b6 black cross, d6 black knight, e6 black king, f4 white queen, d3 white king

White to move. Draw with the queen anywhere except the marked squares.

Position: d7 black knight, e6 black king, f6 black knight, e3 white king, f3 white queen

Draw, but Black must keep his king in a good position.

If the knights cannot be adjacent to each other on a file or rank, the second best position is if they are next to each other diagonally (see diagram).

The third type of defensive formation is with the knights protecting each other, but this method is riskier.

=== With pawns ===
Ree vs. Hort

Position: e8 black king, f8 black knight, g8 white queen, h7 black rook, d6 black pawn, g6 black pawn, c5 black bishop, d5 white pawn, f5 black pawn, g5 white pawn, f4 white pawn, h4 white knight, g3 white king

Black to play

Position: f8 black knight, g8 white queen, e7 black king, d6 black pawn, g6 black pawn, d5 white pawn, f5 black pawn, g5 white pawn, f4 white pawn, f3 white king, a1 black bishop

Draw agreed. Black has established an impenetrable fortress.

Sometimes the two minor pieces can achieve a fortress against a queen even where there are pawns on the board. In Ree–Hort, Wijk aan Zee 1986 (first diagram), Black had the material disadvantage of rook and bishop against a queen. Dvoretsky writes that Black would probably lose after the natural 1...Bf2+? 2.Kxf2 Rxh4 because of 3.Kg3 Rh7 4.Kf3, followed by a king march to c6, or 3.Qg7!? Rxf4+ 4.Kg3 Rg4+ 5.Kf3, threatening 6.Qf6 or 6.Qc7. Instead, Hort forced a draw with 1... Rxh4!! 2. Kxh4 Bd4! (imprisoning White's queen) 3. Kg3 Ke7 4.Kf3 Ba1 (second diagram), and the players agreed to a draw. White's queen has no moves, all of Black's pawns are protected, and his bishop will shuttle back and forth on the squares a1, b2, c3, and d4.

== Knight versus a rook and pawn ==
Em. Lasker vs. Ed. Lasker, 1924

Position: a4 white knight, b4 white king, f4 black king, b3 black pawn, g3 black rook

A surprising draw

At the New York City 1924 tournament, former world champion Emanuel Lasker was in trouble against Edward Lasker, but surprised everyone by discovering a new endgame fortress. Despite having only a knight for a rook and pawn, White draws by moving his knight back and forth between b2 and a4. Black's only real winning try is to get his king to c2. However, to do so Black has to move his king so far from the pawn that White can play Ka3–b2 and Nc5xb3, when the rook versus knight ending is an easy draw. The game concluded:

93. Nb2 Ke4 94. Na4 Kd4 95. Nb2 Rf3 96. Na4 Re3 97. Nb2 Ke4 98. Na4 Kf3 99. Ka3! Ke4

If 99...Ke2, 100.Nc5 Kd2 101.Kb2! (101.Nxb3+?? Kc2 and Black wins) and 102.Nxb3 draws.

100. Kb4 Kd4 101. Nb2 Rh3 102. Na4 Kd3 103. Kxb3 Kd4+ ½–½

== Bishop versus rook and bishop pawn on the sixth rank ==
from de la Villa, page 220

Position: f8 black king, b7 white rook, e6 black circle, f6 white pawn, d5 black circle, e5 white king, c4 black bishop, b3 black circle, a2 black circle

Black draws

A bishop can make a fortress versus a rook and a bishop pawn on the sixth rank, if the bishop is on the color of the pawn's seventh rank square and the defending king is in front of the pawn. In this position, White would win if he had gotten the king to the sixth rank ahead of the pawn. Black draws by keeping the bishop on the diagonal from a2 to e6, except when giving check. The bishop keeps the white king off e6 and checks him if he goes to g6, to drive him away. A possible continuation:

1... Ba2 2. Kf4

2.f7 is an interesting attempt, but then Black plays 2...Kg7! (not 2...Bxf7?? when White wins by playing 3.Kf6) and then 3...Bxf7, with a draw. 2...Kg7 prevents 3.Kf6, which would win.

2... Bc4 3. Kg5 Bd5!

The only move to draw, since the bishop must be able to check the king if it goes to g6.

4. Rc7 Ba2! 5. Kg6 Bb1+! 6. Kh6 Ba2! 7. Ra7

If 7.f7 Bxf7!: the pawn can be safely captured when the white king is on h6.

7... Bc4

Draw, because White cannot make progress.

== Defense perimeter (pawn fortress) ==
A defense perimeter is a drawing technique in which the side behind in material or otherwise at a disadvantage sets up a perimeter, largely or wholly composed of a pawn chain, that the opponent cannot penetrate. Unlike other forms of fortress, a defense perimeter can often be set up in the middlegame with many pieces remaining on the board.

Position: d8 white bishop, b7 black rook, e7 black pawn, a6 black rook, d6 black pawn, f6 black pawn, a5 black bishop, b5 black king, c5 black pawn, e5 white pawn, g5 black pawn, b4 black pawn, d4 white pawn, f4 white pawn, g4 white pawn, h4 black pawn, a3 black pawn, c3 white pawn, h3 white pawn, a2 white pawn, b2 white pawn, c2 white bishop, e2 white king

White, on move, forces a draw.

Position: d8 black king, b7 black rook, e7 black pawn, a6 black rook, d6 black pawn, e6 white pawn, f6 black pawn, a5 black bishop, c5 black pawn, d5 white pawn, f5 white pawn, g5 black pawn, b4 black pawn, c4 white pawn, g4 white pawn, h4 black pawn, a3 black pawn, b3 white pawn, h3 white pawn, a2 white pawn, e2 white king

Black, ahead two rooks and a bishop, cannot breach White's defense perimeter.

The position in the first diagram, a chess problem by W.E. Rudolph (La Strategie 1912), illustrates the defense perimeter. White already has a huge material disadvantage, but forces a draw by giving up their remaining pieces to establish an impenetrable defense perimeter with their pawns. White draws with 1. Ba4+! Kxa4 (1...Kc4?? 2.Bb3+! Kb5 3.c4+ Kc6 4.Ba4+!, forcing Rb5, wins for White) 2. b3+ Kb5 3. c4+ Kc6 4. d5+ Kd7 5. e6+! Kxd8 6. f5! (second diagram). Now Black is up two rooks and a bishop (normally an overwhelming material advantage) but has no hope of breaking through White's defense perimeter. The only winning attempts Black can make are to place their rooks on b5, c6, etc. and hope that White captures them. White draws by ignoring all such offers and simply shuffling their king about.

Petrosian vs. Hazai

Position: c8 black king, a7 black queen, c7 black pawn, d6 black pawn, a5 black pawn, b5 white pawn, c5 black pawn, d5 white pawn, e5 black pawn, g5 black pawn, h5 black pawn, a4 white knight, c4 white pawn, e4 white pawn, f4 black pawn, a3 white pawn, f3 white pawn, g3 black bishop, h3 white pawn, a2 white king, b2 white queen, g2 white pawn

Black to play

Position: c8 black king, b6 black pawn, d6 black pawn, a5 black pawn, b5 white pawn, c5 black pawn, d5 white pawn, e5 black pawn, c4 white pawn, e4 white pawn, f4 black pawn, h4 black pawn, a3 white pawn, f3 white pawn, g3 black bishop, h3 white pawn, a2 white king, d2 white queen

White cannot penetrate Black's fortress.

The above example may seem fanciful, but Black achieved a similar defense perimeter in Arshak Petrosian–Hazai, Schilde 1970 (first diagram) via a swindle. Black has a difficult endgame, since White can attack and win his a-pawn by force, and he has no counterplay. Black tried the extraordinary 45... Qb6!?, to which White replied with the obvious 46. Nxb6+? This is actually a critical mistake, enabling Black to establish an impenetrable fortress. White should have carried out his plan of winning Black's a-pawn, for example with 46.Qc1 (threatening 47.Nxb6+ cxb6 48.h4! gxh4 49.Qh1 and Qh3, winning) Qa7 47.Qd2 followed by Kb3, Nc3, Ka4, and Na2–c1–b3. 46... cxb6 Now Black threatens 47...h4, locking down the entire board with his pawns, so White tries to break the position open. 47. h4 gxh4 48. Qd2 h3! 49. gxh3 Otherwise 49...h2 draws. 49... h4! (second diagram) Black has established his fortress, and now can draw by simply moving his king around. The only way White could attempt to breach the fortress would be a queen sacrifice at some point (for example Qxa5 or Qxe5), but none of these give White winning chances as long as Black keeps his king near the center. The players shuffled their kings, and White's queen, around for six more moves before agreeing to a draw.

Smirin vs. HIARCS

Position: b7 black pawn, e7 black bishop, g6 black king, f5 black pawn, a4 black pawn, d4 white knight, e4 black bishop, f4 white pawn, g4 black pawn, h4 black pawn, a3 white pawn, c3 white bishop, e3 white pawn, b2 white pawn, h2 white pawn, g1 white king

Position after 46.Kg1: White envisions a pawn fortress.

Position: b7 black pawn, e6 black king, f5 black pawn, a4 black pawn, b4 white pawn, e4 black bishop, f4 white pawn, h4 black pawn, c3 white knight, e3 white pawn, g3 black pawn, h3 white pawn, b2 white pawn, g1 white king

Position after 51.Nc3: the fortress is complete.

In Smirin–HIARCS, Smirin-Computers match 2002, the super-grandmaster looked to be in trouble against the computer, which has the bishop pair, can tie White's king down with ...g3, and threatens to invade with its king on the light squares. Smirin, however, saw that he could set up a fortress with his pawns. The game continued 46... g3 47. h3! A surprising move, giving Black a formidable protected passed pawn on the sixth rank, but it begins to build White's fortress, keeping Black's king out of g4. 47... Bc5 48. Bb4! Now Smirin gives HIARCS the choice between an opposite-colored bishops endgame (in which, moreover, White will play Be7 and win the h-pawn if Black's king comes to the center) and a bishop versus knight ending in which Smirin envisions a fortress. 48... Bxb4 49. axb4 Kf7 Black could try to prevent White's coming maneuver with 49...Bd3, but then White could play 50.Nf3 Kh5 (forced) 51.Nd4. 50. Nb5! Ke6 51. Nc3! Completing the fortress. Now Black's king has no way in, and his bishop can do nothing, since White's king can prevent ...Bf1, attacking White's only pawn on a light square. The game concluded: 51... Bc2 52. Kg2 Kd6 53. Kg1 Kc6 54. Kg2 b5 55. Kg1 Bd3 56. Kg2 Be4+ 57. Kg1 Bc2 58. Kg2 Bd3 59. Kg1 Be4 60. Kf1 ½–½

== Other examples ==
Here are some other drawing fortresses.

=== Fortresses against a bishop ===
Müller & Pajeken

Position: a7 white bishop, b7 black king, b6 white pawn, c5 white king

Draw

Müller & Pajeken

Position: b8 black king, a7 black pawn, a6 white pawn, b5 white king, d5 white bishop

Draw

=== Fortresses against a knight ===
Position: a7 black knight, e2 white king, h2 black pawn, h1 black king

White draws with 1.Kf2! (but not with 1.Kf1??)

Position: b8 black king, a7 black pawn, a6 white pawn, c6 white king, b5 white knight

Draw with either side to move

=== Fortresses against a rook ===
Position: g8 black king, b7 white rook, h7 black pawn, e6 white king, g6 black pawn, c3 black bishop, g3 white pawn, h2 white pawn

Black to move draws with 1...h5!

== Semi-fortress in two bishops vs. knight ==
Kling & Horwitz, 1851

Position: f8 white bishop, b7 black knight, b6 black king, d5 white king, a4 white bishop

This is a semi-fortress, but White wins in 45 moves.

Lomonosov Tablebases

Position: f8 white king, a7 black king, a4 white knight, f2 white pawn, g2 white pawn, c1 black bishop, h1 black bishop

White to move, although Black mates in 193.

The endgame of two bishops versus a knight was thought to be a draw for more than one hundred years. It was known that the temporary defensive fortress in this position could be broken down after a number of moves, but it was assumed that the fortress could be reformed in another corner. Computer endgame tablebases show that the bishops generally win, but it takes up to 66 moves. It takes several moves to force Black out of the temporary fortress in the corner; then precise play with the bishops prevents Black from forming the fortress in another corner. The position in the diagram was thought to be a draw by Kling and Horwitz but computer analysis shows that White wins in 45 moves (either by checkmate or by winning the knight). All of the long wins in this endgame go through this type of semi-fortress position.

Pintér vs. Bronstein, 1977

Position: c7 black bishop, d5 black bishop, g5 black king, e3 white king, e1 white knight

Position before 68.Kd4

This game between József Pintér and David Bronstein demonstrates the human play of the endgame. The defender has two ideas: (1) keep the king off the edge of the board and (2) keep the knight close to the king. White reaches the semi-fortress after 71. Nb2!, which falls after 75... Kb5!. White gets to a semi-fortress again in another corner after 90. Ng2+. After 100. Ke3 White cannot hold that semi-fortress any longer, but forms one in another corner after 112. Nb7!. On move 117 White claimed a draw by the fifty move rule.

== Positional draw ==
Portisch vs. Kavalek, 1978

Position: d7 black knight, d6 black king, a5 white bishop, a4 white pawn, d4 white king, b3 white pawn

White to move

A "positional draw" is a concept most commonly used in endgame studies and describes an impasse other than stalemate. It usually involves the repetition of moves in which neither side can make progress or safely deviate. Typically a material advantage is balanced by a positional advantage. Fortresses and perpetual check are examples of positional draws. Sometimes they salvage a draw from a position that seems hopeless because of a material deficit. Grandmaster John Nunn describes a positional draw as a position in which one side has enough material to normally win and he is not under direct attack, but some special feature of the position (often a blockade) prevents him from winning.

A simple example is shown in the game between Lajos Portisch and Lubomir Kavalek. White could have won easily with 1.Be1 Kc6 2.b4. However, play continued 1. b4? Nb8 2. b5 Nc6+! The only way to avoid the threatened 3...Nxa5 is 3.bxc6 Kxc6, but the resultant position is a draw because the bishop is on the wrong color to be able to force the rook pawn's promotion (see above, wrong bishop, and wrong rook pawn).

Pachman

Position: e5 black rook, f5 black king, e4 black rook, d3 white bishop, f3 white king

Either side to move

Luděk Pachman cites the endgame position in the diagram as a simple example of a positional draw. White on move simply plays waiting moves with the bishop (Bb1–c2–d3). As for Black, "If he is unwilling to allow the transition to the drawn ending of Rook versus Bishop, nothing else remains for him but to move his Rook at [e5] continuously up and down the [e-file]." Pachman explains, "The indecisive result here contradicts the principles concerning the value of the pieces and is caused by the bad position of the black pieces (pinned rook at [e4])."

Botvinnik vs. Keres, 1951

Position: b7 white rook, c7 white pawn, f7 black knight, g7 black king, h7 black pawn, d6 black pawn, f6 black pawn, g6 black pawn, d5 white pawn, e5 black pawn, e4 white pawn, f4 white pawn, c3 black rook, g3 white pawn, h2 white pawn, h1 white king

Position after 52.c7, draw

This position from a game between Mikhail Botvinnik and Paul Keres in the 1951 USSR Championship is drawn because the black king cannot get free and the rook must stay on the c-file. The players agreed to a draw four moves later.

Tal vs. Fischer, 1962

Position: c8 black rook, f7 black pawn, h7 black king, d6 black pawn, f6 white pawn, d5 white pawn, g5 black pawn, e4 white rook, f4 black bishop, h4 black pawn, h3 white pawn, g2 white pawn, b1 white rook, g1 white king

Position after 47...Kh7

Position: d6 black pawn, f6 black king, d5 white rook, g5 black pawn, e4 white rook, f4 black bishop, h4 black pawn, b3 black rook, h3 white pawn, f2 white king, g2 white pawn

Final position, after 58.Re4

The first diagram shows a position from a game between former world champion Mikhail Tal and future world champion Bobby Fischer from the 1962 Candidates Tournament in Curaçao. After 41 moves Tal had the advantage but Fischer sacrificed the exchange (a rook for a knight). The game was drawn on the 58th move.

Benko vs. Bonin

Position: e8 black king, e7 black knight, c6 black rook, c5 white pawn, e5 white queen, g5 white pawn, h5 white king

Draw

In this position from a game between Pal Benko and International Master Jay Bonin, White realized that the blockade cannot be broken and the game is a draw despite the extra material.

Simkhovich, 1926

Position: e8 white king, c7 black king, e7 white bishop, f7 black pawn, h7 white knight, g6 black pawn, f5 white pawn, g5 white pawn, h3 black pawn, a2 black bishop

White to play and draw

Position: d7 black king, f7 black pawn, g7 white king, h7 white knight, f6 white pawn, g6 black pawn, h6 white bishop, g5 white pawn, e4 black queen, a2 black bishop

Positional draw

The position looks lost for White, as he cannot stop the h-pawn from queening, but he does have a defence which seems to defy the rules of logic. White will calmly construct a fortress which will hide his pieces from attack. The only weakness in White's fortress is the g-pawn. This pawn has to be defended by the bishop and the only square where this can be done safely is from h6.

1. Bf6!

White threatens to stop the advance of the h-pawn with ...Be5+; building the fortress immediately does not work: 1.f6? h2 2.Kf8 h1=Q 3.Kg7 (3.Kg8 Qg2 4.Bf8 Qa8 5.Kg7 Kd7 6.Kg8 Ke6 7.Kg7 Kf5 8.Kg8 Bb3 9.Kg7 Qh1−+) 3...Kd7 4.Bb4 Ke6 5.Bd2 Kf5 6.Be3 Qf3 7.Bd2 Qe2 8.Bc1 Qd1 9.Be3 Qd3 10.Bc1 Qc3−+

1... Kd6 2. Be7+

2.fxg6? This move destroys the fortress after 2...fxg6 3.Be7+ Kc6−+

2...Kc6

2... Ke5 White draws without a fortress after 3.fxg6 fxg6 4.Bd8 Kd6 5.Nf6! h2 6.Ne4+ Ke6 7.Nf2 Bd5 8.Bf6 h1=Q 9.Nxh1 Bxh1=

3. f6!

Chess computer programs have difficulty assessing fortress positions because the normal values for the pieces do not apply. White has achieved the closing of the long diagonal a8–h1. The only way to avoid this would be for Black to repeat moves. Now White can build his fortress without the worry of the queen getting to the back rank via the long diagonal.

3...h2 4. Bf8! h1=Q 5. Bh6!

with the idea of 6.Kf8 and 7.Kg7. White will be safe behind the barrier of pawns. It is a positional draw.
