= Bishop (chess) =

Chess piece

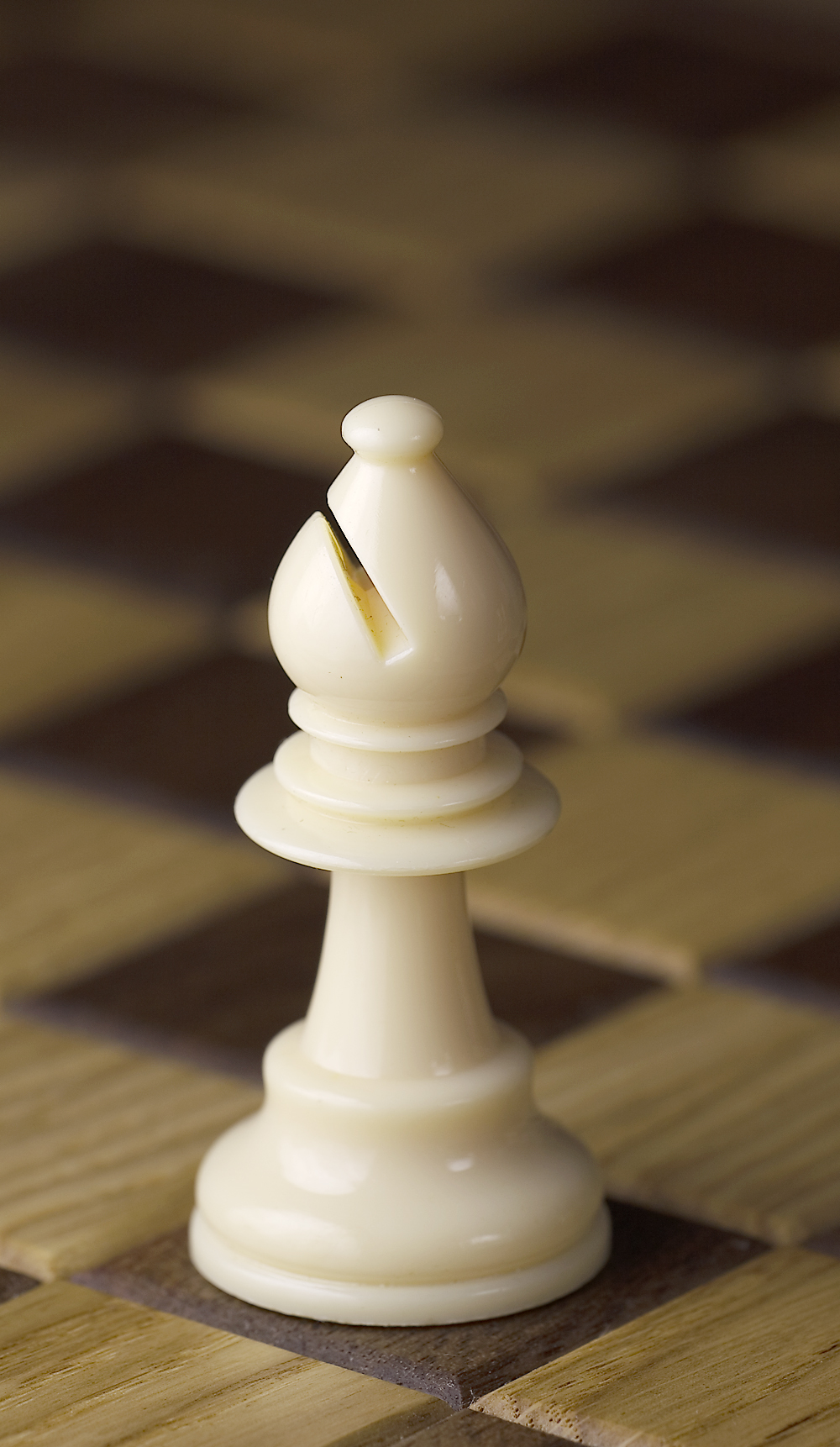
White bishop

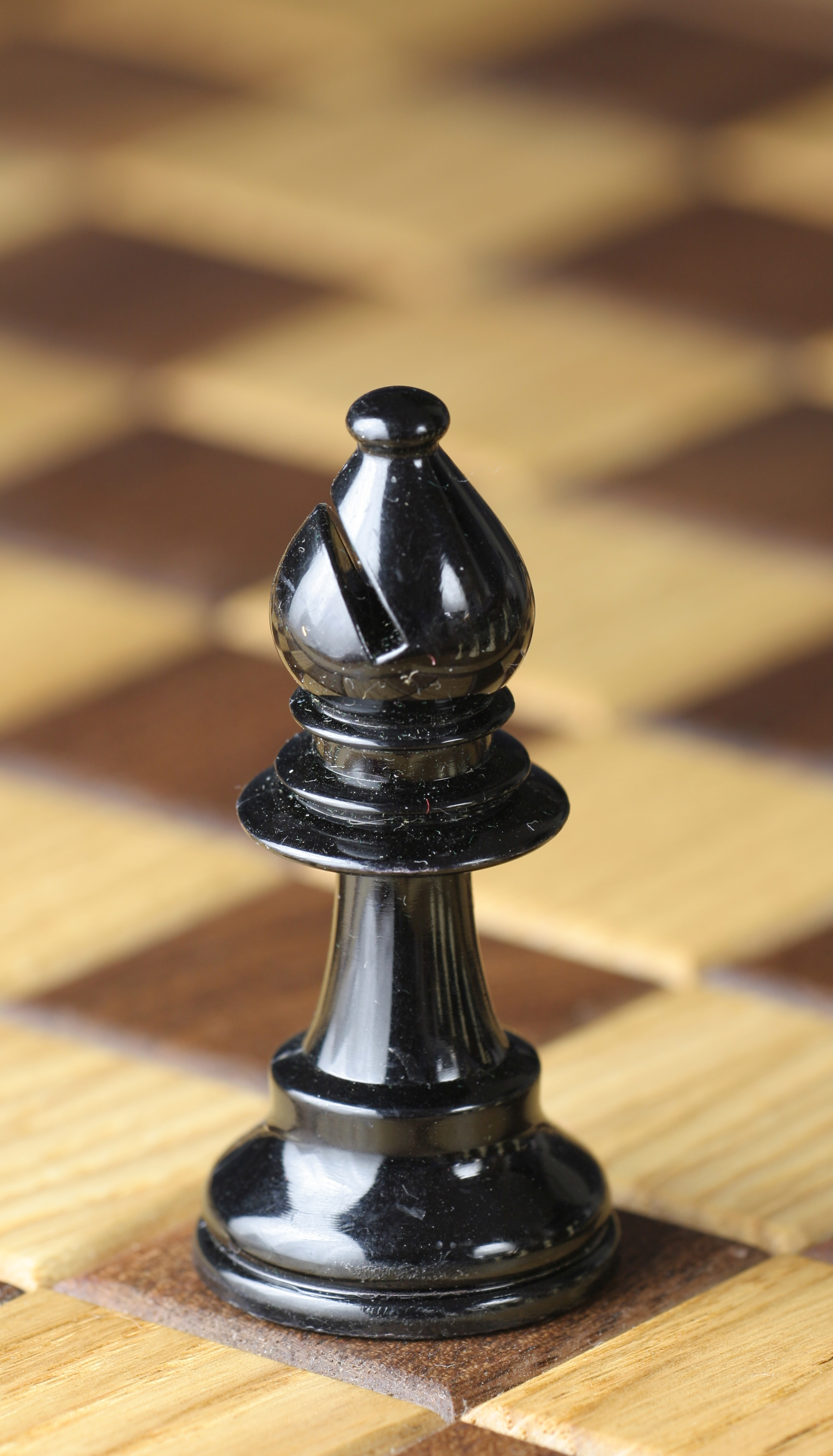
Black bishop

The bishop (♗, ♝) is a piece in the game of chess. It moves and captures along diagonals without jumping over interfering pieces. Each player begins the game with two bishops. The starting squares are c1 and f1 for White's bishops, and c8 and f8 for Black's bishops.

== Placement and movement ==
The king's bishop is placed on f1 for White and f8 for Black; the queen's bishop is placed on c1 for White and c8 for Black.

The bishop has no restrictions in distance for each move but is limited to diagonal movement. It cannot jump over other pieces. A bishop captures by occupying the square on which an enemy piece stands. As a consequence of its diagonal movement, each bishop always remains on one square color. Owing to this, it is common to refer to a bishop as a light-squared or dark-squared bishop.

Position: c8 black bishop, f8 black bishop, c1 white bishop, f1 white bishop

Initial placement of the bishops

Position: h8 black circle, a7 black circle, d7 black pawn, g7 black circle, h7 white circle, b6 black circle, e6 white circle, f6 black circle, g6 white circle, c5 black circle, e5 black circle, f5 white bishop, d4 black bishop, e4 white circle, g4 white circle, c3 black circle, d3 white circle, e3 black circle, h3 white circle, b2 black circle, c2 white pawn, f2 black circle, a1 black circle, g1 black circle

The black bishop can move to any of the squares marked by a black dot. The white bishop can move to any square marked by a white dot or capture the pawn on d7.

== Comparison – other pieces ==
=== Versus rook ===
A rook is generally worth about two pawns more than a bishop. The bishop has access to only half of the squares on the board, whereas all squares of the board are accessible to the rook. When unobstructed, a rook attacks fourteen squares regardless of position, whereas a bishop attacks no more than thirteen (from one of four center squares) and sometimes as few as seven (from sides and corners). A king and rook can force checkmate against a lone king, whereas a king and bishop cannot. A king and two bishops on opposite-colored squares, however, can force mate.

=== Versus knight ===
Knights and bishops are each worth about three pawns. This means bishops are approximately equal in strength to knights, but depending on the game situation, either may have a distinct advantage. In general, the bishop is slightly stronger than the knight.

Less experienced players tend to underrate the bishop compared to the knight because the knight can reach all squares and is more adept at forking. More experienced players understand the power of the bishop.

Bishops usually gain in relative strength towards the endgame as more pieces are captured and more open lines become available on which they can operate. A bishop can easily influence both wings simultaneously, whereas a knight is less capable of doing so. In an open endgame, a pair of bishops is decidedly superior to either a bishop and a knight, or two knights. A player possessing a pair of bishops has a strategic weapon in the form of a long-term threat to trade down to an advantageous endgame. Such an advantage of having both pieces is sometimes called having the bishop pair.

Two bishops on opposite-colored squares and king can force checkmate against a lone king, whereas two knights cannot. A bishop and knight can force mate, but with far greater difficulty than two bishops.

In certain positions a bishop can by itself lose a move (see triangulation and tempo), while a knight can never do so. The bishop is capable of skewering or pinning a piece, while the knight can do neither. A bishop can in some situations hinder a knight from moving. In these situations, the bishop is said to be "dominating" the knight.

On the other hand, in the opening and middlegame a bishop may be hemmed in by pawns of both players, and thus be inferior to a knight which can jump over them. A knight check cannot be blocked but a bishop check can. Furthermore, on a crowded board a knight has many tactical opportunities to fork two enemy pieces. A bishop can fork, but opportunities are rarer. One such example occurs in the position illustrated, which arises from the Ruy Lopez: 1.e4 e5 2.Nf3 Nc6 3.Bb5 a6 4.Ba4 Nf6 5.0-0 b5 6.Bb3 Be7 7.d4 d6 8.c3 Bg4 9.h3!? Bxf3 10.Qxf3 exd4 11.Qg3 g6 12.Bh6!

Bishop dominating a knight

Position: d4 black bishop, c3 black circle, e3 black circle, b2 black circle, f2 black circle, d1 white knight

The knight cannot move to any of its four legal squares without being captured by the black bishop.
Example of bishop fork

Position: a8 black rook, d8 black queen, e8 black king, h8 black rook, c7 black pawn, e7 black bishop, f7 black pawn, h7 black pawn, a6 black pawn, c6 black knight, d6 black pawn, f6 black knight, g6 black pawn, h6 white bishop, b5 black pawn, d4 black pawn, e4 white pawn, b3 white bishop, c3 white pawn, g3 white queen, h3 white pawn, a2 white pawn, b2 white pawn, f2 white pawn, g2 white pawn, a1 white rook, b1 white knight, f1 white rook, g1 white king

After 12...Nxe4?, the forking 13.Bd5! wins material after, e.g., 13...Nxg3 14.Bxc6+ Qd7 15.Bxd7+ Kxd7 16.fxg3.

== Dimensions and design ==
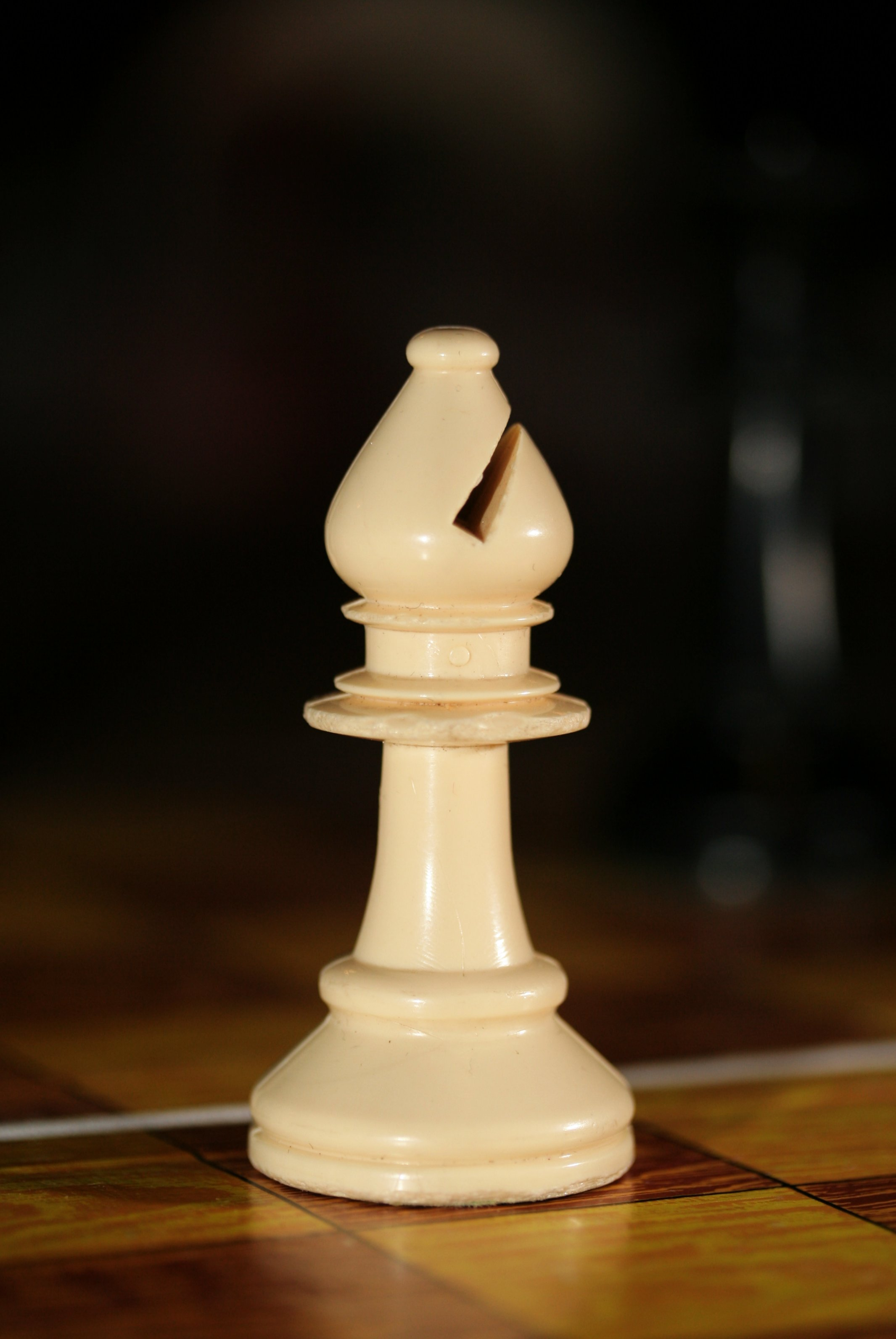
The bishop is represented as a priest wearing a mitre.

The bishop is the third-tallest piece in chess, often portrayed as the advisor in chess as indicated by its placement next to the king and queen. The design is characterized by a slanted top with a distinctive slit, or "mitre", which represents a stylized version of a mitre hat worn by a bishop. This slit is a key feature for distinguishing it from a pawn.

== Game use ==
=== Good bishop and bad bishop ===
Krasenkow vs. Zvjaginsev, 2004

Position: c8 black bishop, g8 black king, d7 black knight, e7 black queen, f7 black rook, h7 black pawn, c6 black pawn, e6 black pawn, g6 black pawn, b5 black pawn, c5 white pawn, d5 black pawn, e5 white pawn, b4 white pawn, d4 white queen, f4 white pawn, b2 white knight, e2 white bishop, g2 white pawn, h2 white pawn, a1 white rook, g1 white king

Position after 23.Rxa1. White's bishop is good, while Black's bishop is almost entirely useless.

In the middlegame, a player with only one bishop should generally place friendly pawns on squares of the color that the bishop cannot move to. This allows the player to control squares of both colors, allows the bishop to move freely among the pawns, and helps fix enemy pawns on squares on which they can be attacked by the bishop. Such a bishop is often referred to as a "good" bishop.

Conversely, a bishop that is impeded by friendly pawns is often referred to as a "bad" bishop (or sometimes, disparagingly, a "tall pawn"). The black light-squared bishop in the French Defense is a notorious example of this concept, as playing 1...e6 and 2...d5 results in there being two pawns impeding its ability to join the game. A bad bishop, however, need not always be a weakness, especially if it is outside its own pawn chains. In addition, having a bad bishop may be advantageous in an opposite-colored bishops endgame. Even if the bad bishop is passively placed, it may serve a useful defensive function; a well-known quip from GM Mihai Șubă is that "Bad bishops protect good pawns." (Note: Discussions on the strength of bishops is covered e.g. in "The Art of Planning, part 2" by Jeremy Silman published in the July 1990 issue of Chess Life. Șubă's quote is mentioned e.g. in Secrets of Modern Chess Strategy, Advances Since Nimzowitsch by John Watson.)

In the position from the game Krasenkow–Zvjaginsev, FIDE World Chess Championship 2004, a thicket of black pawns hems in Black's bishop on c8, so Black is effectively playing with one piece fewer than White. Although the black pawns also obstruct the white bishop on e2, it has many more attacking possibilities, and thus is a good bishop vis-à-vis Black's bad bishop. Black resigned after another ten moves.

=== Fianchetto ===
A bishop may be fianchettoed, for example after moving the g2 pawn to g3 and the bishop on f1 to g2. This can form a strong defense for the castled king on g1 and the bishop can often exert strong pressure on the long diagonal (here h1–a8). A fianchettoed bishop should generally not be given up lightly, since the resulting holes in the pawn formation may prove to be serious weaknesses, particularly if the king has castled on that side of the board.

Position: a7 black pawn, b7 black bishop, c7 black pawn, f7 black pawn, g7 black bishop, h7 black pawn, b6 black pawn, g6 black pawn

Archetypal fianchettos (for Black)

There are nonetheless some modern opening lines where a fianchettoed bishop is given up for a knight in order to double the opponent's pawns, for example 1.d4 g6 2.c4 Bg7 3.Nc3 c5 4.d5 Bxc3+!? 5.bxc3 f5, a sharp line originated by Roman Dzindzichashvili. Giving up a fianchettoed queen's bishop for a knight is usually less problematic. For example, in Karpov–Browne, San Antonio 1972, after 1.c4 c5 2.b3 Nf6 3.Bb2 g6?!, Karpov gave up his fianchettoed bishop with 4.Bxf6! exf6 5.Nc3, doubling Black's pawns and giving him a hole on d5.

=== Endgame ===
An endgame in which each player has only one bishop, one controlling the dark squares and the other the light, will often result in a draw even if one player has a pawn or sometimes two more than the other. The players tend to gain control of squares of opposite colors, and a deadlock results. In endgames with same-colored bishops, however, even a positional advantage may be enough to win.

==== Bishops on opposite colors ====
Endgames in which each player has only one bishop (and no other pieces besides the king) and the bishops are on opposite colors are often drawn, even when one side has an extra pawn or two. Many of these positions would be a win if the bishops were on the same color.

Wolf vs. Leonhardt, 1905

Position: d6 black bishop, f4 black pawn, g4 black pawn, h4 black king, e2 white bishop, g2 white king

Draw with either side to move
Bogoljubov vs. Blümich, 1925

Position: c8 black bishop, f8 black king, f7 black pawn, g7 black pawn, a6 black pawn, c6 black pawn, g6 black pawn, c4 white pawn, e4 black pawn, b3 white pawn, e3 white bishop, h3 white pawn, a2 white pawn, f2 white pawn, g2 white pawn, d1 white king

Position after 28...Kf8

The position from the game H. Wolf–P. Leonhardt, 1905 (see diagram) shows an important defensive setup. Black can make no progress, since the white bishop ties the black king to defending the pawn on g4 and it also prevents the advance ...f3+ because it would simply capture the pawn – then either the other pawn is exchanged for the bishop (an immediate draw) or the pawn advances (an easily drawn position). Otherwise the bishop alternates between the squares d1 and e2.

If two pawns are connected, they normally win if they reach their sixth rank, otherwise the game may be a draw (as above). If two pawns are separated by one file they usually draw, but win if they are farther apart.

In some cases with more pawns on the board, it is actually advantageous to have the bishops on opposite colors if one side has weak pawns. In the 1925 game Efim Bogoljubov–Max Blümich (see diagram), White wins because of the bishops being on opposite colors making Black weak on the dark squares, the weakness of Black's isolated pawns on the queenside, and the weak doubled pawns on the kingside. The game continued:

29.Kd2 Ke7 30.Kc3 f6 31.Kd4 Be6 32.Kc5 Kd7 33.Kb6 g5 34.Kxa6 Kc7 35.Bb6+ Kc8 36.Bc5 Kc7 37.Bf8 f5 38.Bxg7 f4 39.Bf6 f3 40.gxf3 exf3 41.Bxg5 Bxh3 42.Bf4+ 1–0

==== Wrong bishop ====
In an endgame with a bishop, in some cases the bishop is the "wrong bishop", meaning that it is on the wrong color of square for some purpose (usually promoting a pawn). For example, with just a bishop and a rook pawn, if the bishop cannot control the promotion square of the pawn, it is said to be the "wrong bishop" or the pawn is said to be the wrong rook pawn. This results in some positions being drawn (by setting up a fortress) which otherwise would be won.

== History ==
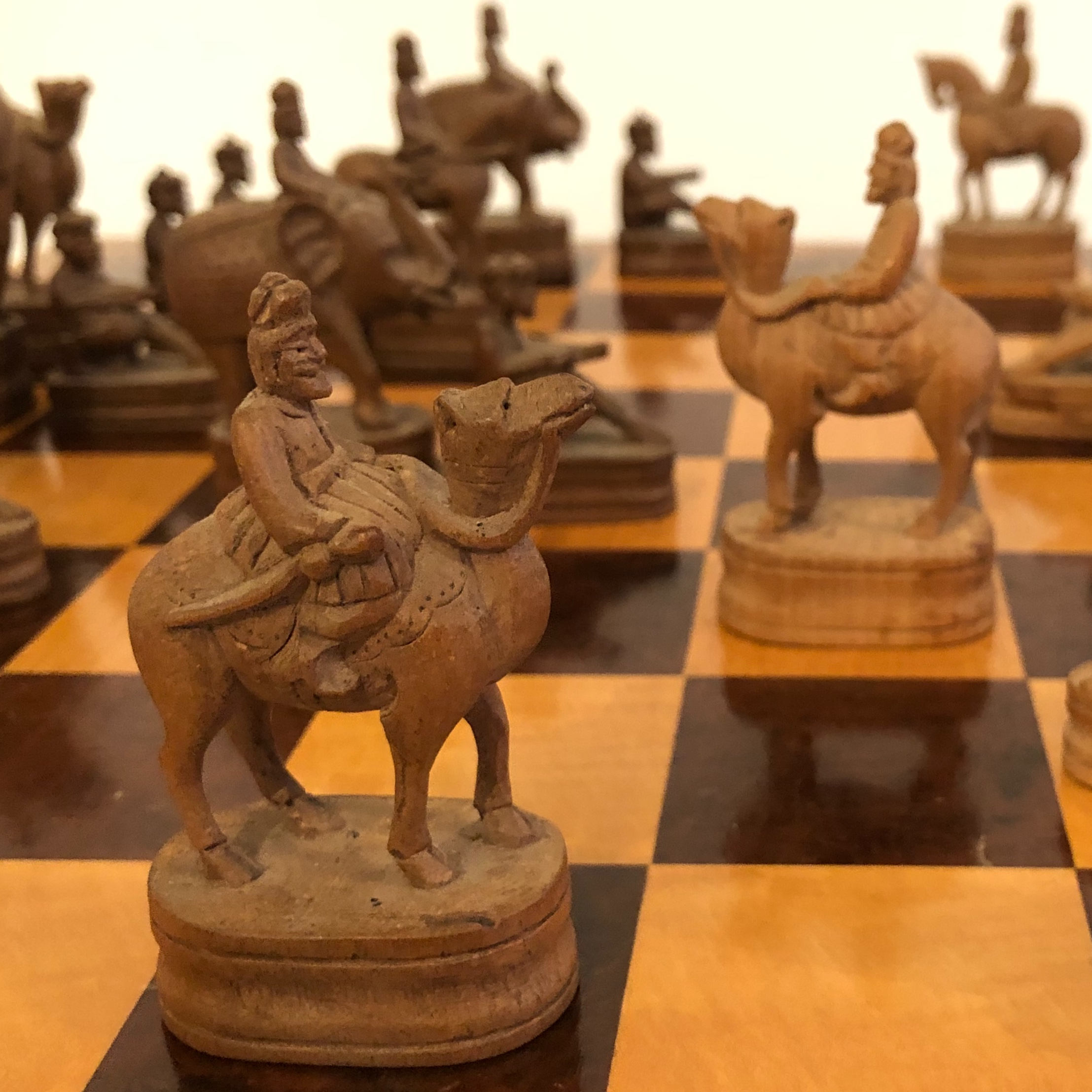
Antique Indian chess bishop represented by the camel, carved from sandalwood

The bishop's predecessor in medieval chess, shatranj (originally chaturanga), was the alfil, meaning "elephant", which could leap two squares along any diagonal, and could jump over an intervening piece. As a consequence, each alfil was restricted to eight squares, and no alfil could attack another. The modern bishop first appeared shortly after 1200 in Courier chess. A piece with this move, called a cocatriz or crocodile, is part of the Grande Acedrex in the Libro de los juegos compiled in 1283 for King Alfonso X of Castile. The game is attributed to "India", then a very vague term. About half a century later Muḥammad ibn Maḥmud al-Āmulī, in his Treasury of the Sciences, describes an expanded form of chess with two pieces moving "like the rook but obliquely". The bishop was also independently invented in Japan at about the same time (the 13th century), where it formed part of sho shogi and dai shogi; it remains present in modern shogi as the direct descendant of sho shogi.

Position: b6 white circle, f6 white circle, e5 black knight, d4 white bishop, b2 white circle, f2 white circle

Where the alfil/elephant can move (cannot capture Black's knight)

Position: a7 white circle, b6 white circle, c5 white circle, e5 black knight, d4 white bishop, c3 white circle, e3 white circle, b2 white circle, f2 white circle, a1 white circle, g1 white circle

Where the bishop can move (can capture Black's knight)

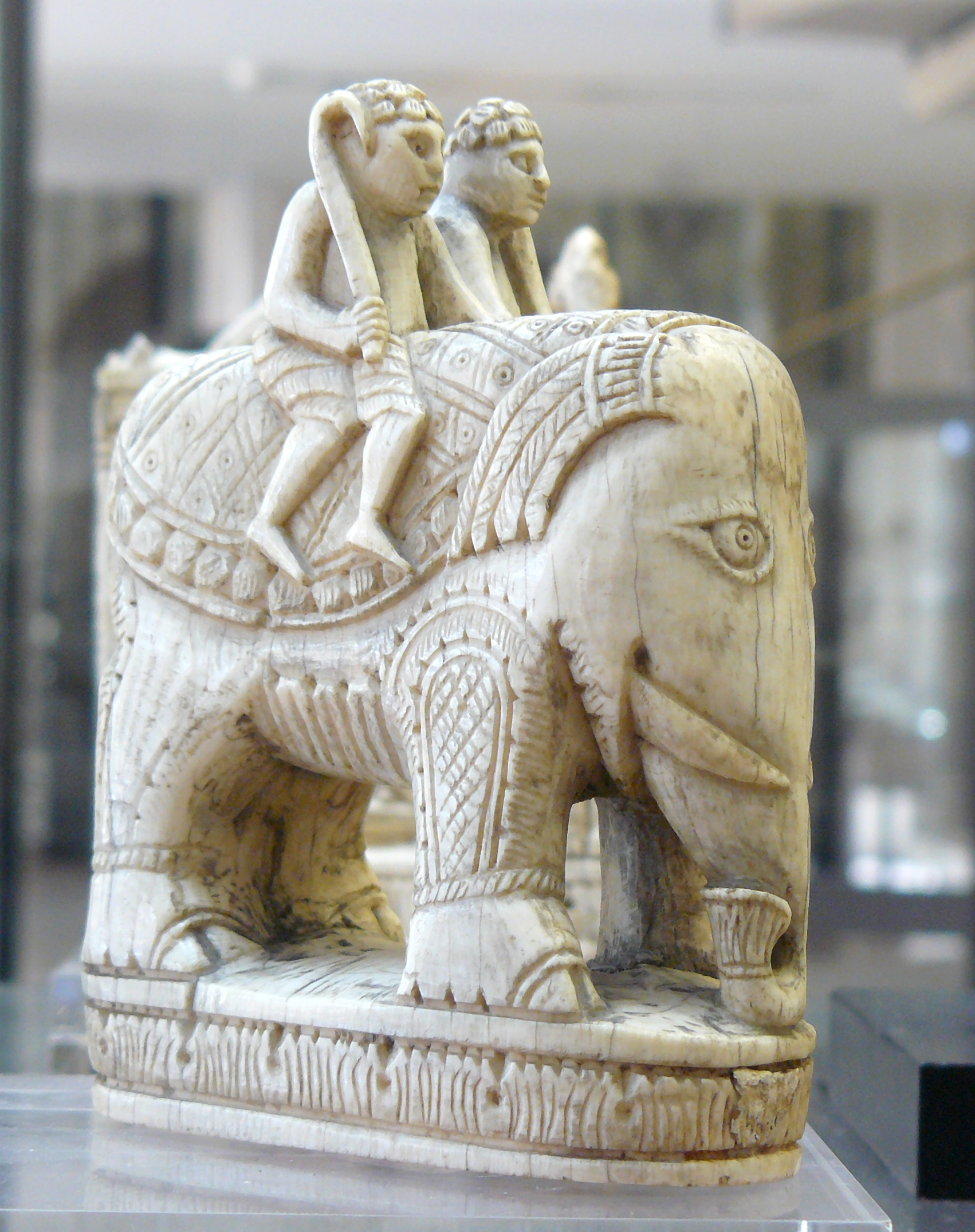
Elephant chess piece from the Charlemagne chessmen, 11th century

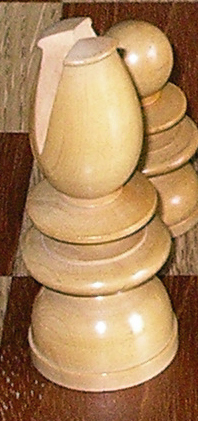
A pre-Staunton bishop

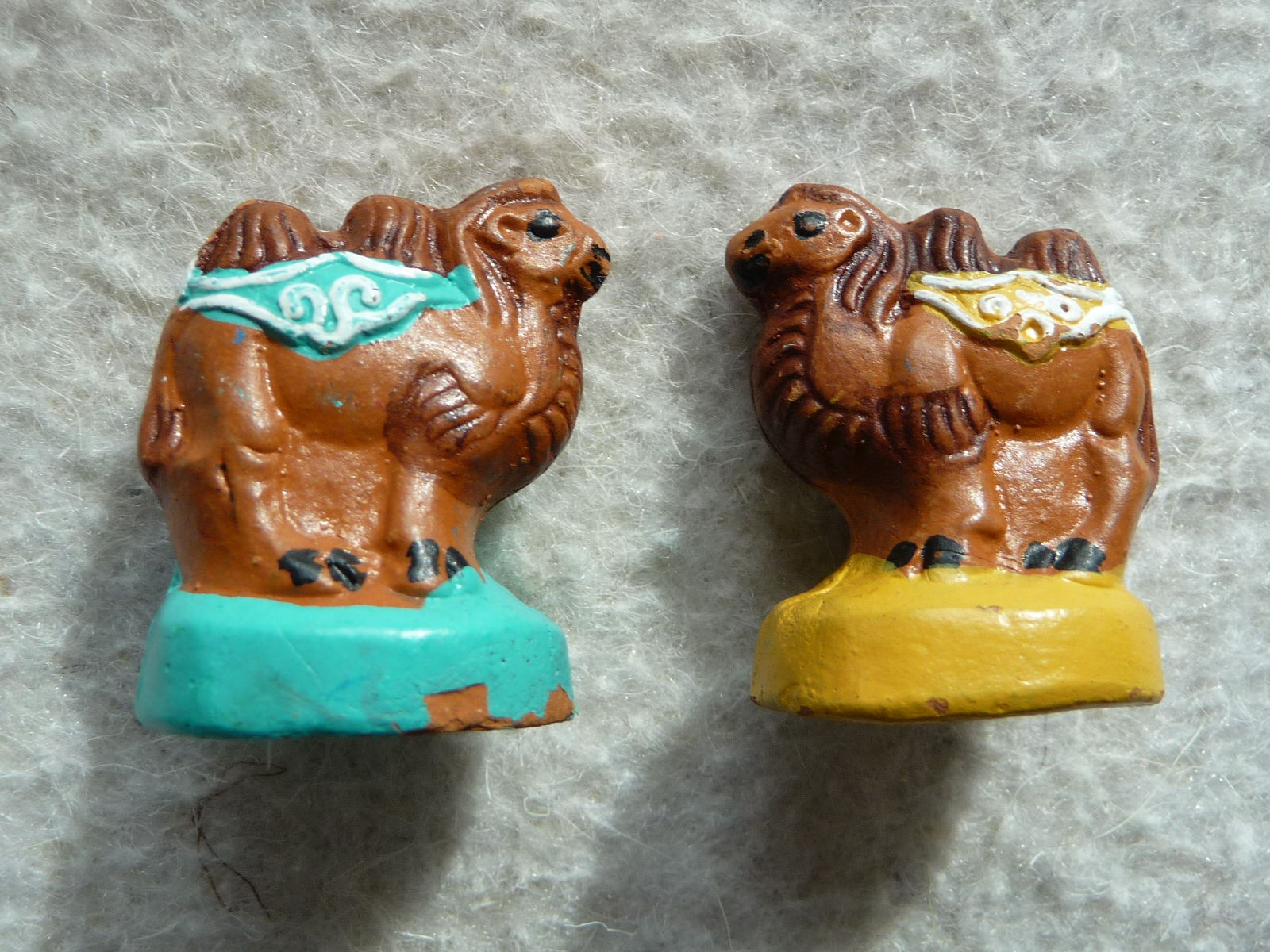
Camel chess pieces, from a Mongolian set

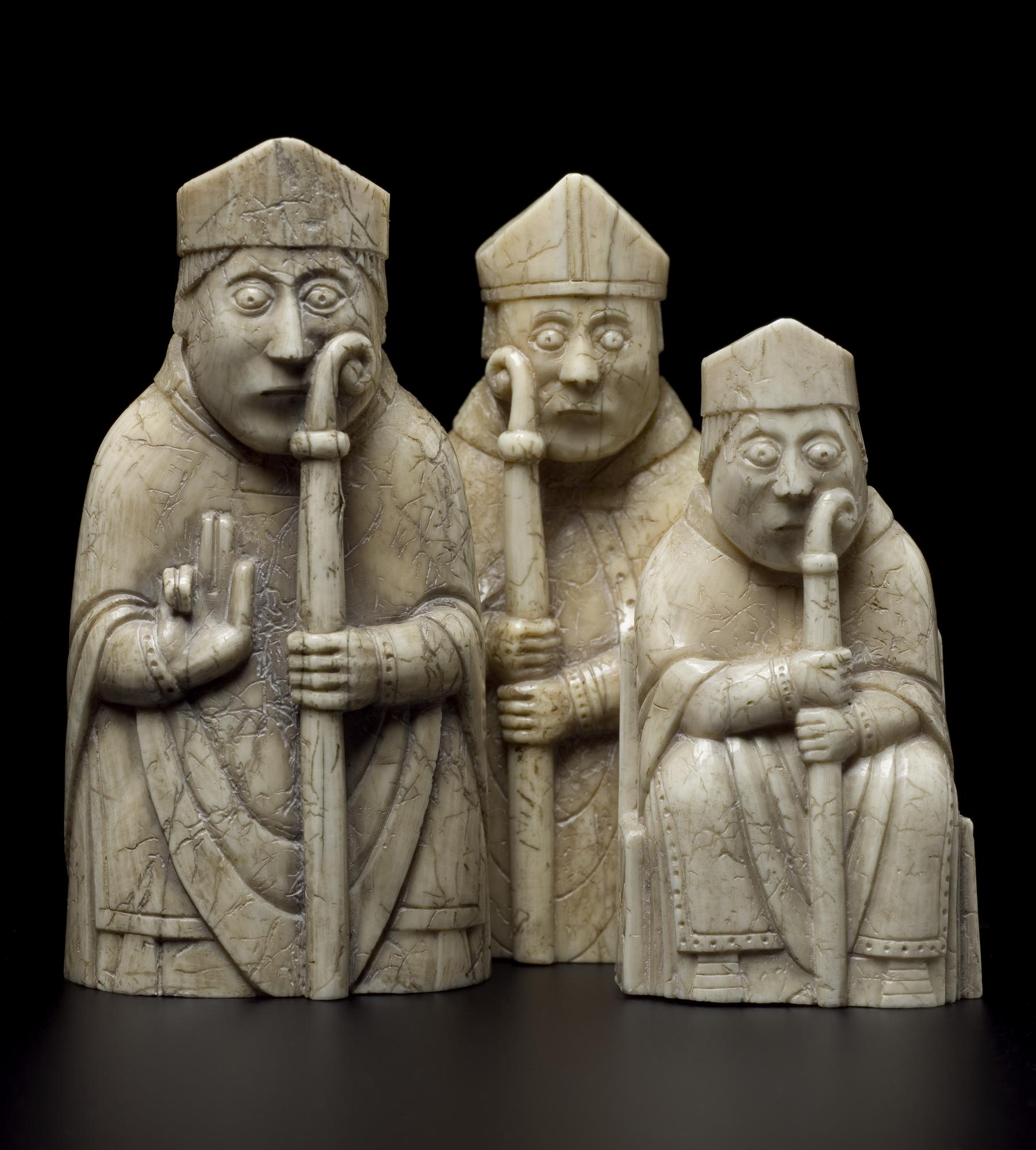
The bishops in the Lewis chessmen

Derivatives of alfil survive in the languages of the two countries where chess was first introduced within Western Europe—Italian (alfiere) and Spanish (alfil). (Note: The Spanish alfil is simply a loanword of the Persian term, without any other meaning; while the Italian form became alfiere—an already existing Germanic- or Arabian-derived word for "standard-bearer".) It was known as the aufin in French and progressively evolved into its current word, fou, or the aufin, alphin, or archer in early English.

The earliest references to bishops on the chessboard are two 13th-century Latin texts, De Vetula and Quaedam moralitas de scaccario. The etymology of "bishop" comes from Old English bisceop "bishop, high priest," from Late Latin episcopus, from Greek episkopos "watcher, overseer." The term "bishop" as applied specifically to the chess piece was first recorded in the 16th century, with the first known written example dating back to the 1560s. In all other Germanic languages, except for Icelandic, it is called various names, all of which directly translate to English as "runner" or "messenger". In Icelandic, however, it is called "biskup", with the same meaning as in English. The use of the term in Icelandic predates that of the English language, as the first mentioning of "biskup" in Icelandic texts dates back to the early part of the 14th century, while the 12th-century Lewis Chessmen portray the bishop as an unambiguously ecclesiastical figure. In the Saga of Earl Mágus, which was written in Iceland somewhere between 1300 and 1325, it is described how an emperor was checkmated by a bishop. This has led to some speculations as to the origin of the English use of the term "bishop".

The canonical chessmen date back to the Staunton chess set of 1849. The piece's deep groove symbolizes a bishop's (or abbot's) mitre. Some have written that the groove originated from the original form of the piece, an elephant with the groove representing the elephant's tusks. The English apparently chose to call the piece a bishop because the projections at the top resembled a mitre. This groove was interpreted differently in different countries as the game moved to Europe. In France, for example, the groove was taken to be a jester's cap, which fit with the piece's French name fou (jester) (Note: The word can also mean madman or gannet.) even though its etymology comes from the original arabic alfil. Similarly, in Romania it is named nebun (meaning crazy, but also jester).

In some Slavic languages (e.g. Czech/Slovak) the bishop is called střelec/strelec, which directly translates to English as a "shooter" meaning an archer, while in others it is still known as "elephant" (e.g. Russian slon). In South Slavic languages it is usually known as lovac, meaning "hunter", or laufer, taken from the German name for the same piece (laufer is also a co-official Polish name for the piece alongside goniec). In Bulgarian the bishop is called "officer" (Bulgarian: офицер), which is also the piece's alternative name in Russian; it is also called αξιωματικός (axiomatikos) in Greek, афіцэр (afitser) in Belarusian and oficeri in Albanian.

In Mongolian and several Indian languages it is called the "camel".

In Lithuanian it is the rikis, a kind of military commander in medieval Lithuania.

In Latvia it is known as laidnis, a term for the wooden handle part of some firearms.

=== Name translations ===
Overview of chess piece names
Language	Bishop	Translation
Adyghe	Пл пыл (pyl)	elephant
Afrikaans	L Loper	runner
Albanian	F Fili / Oficeri	elephant / officer
Arabic	ف فيل (fīl)	elephant
Azerbaijani	F Fil	elephant
Armenian	Փ Փիղ (P῾ił)	elephant
Basque	A Alfila	elephant
Belarusian (Taraškievica)	А афіцэр	officer
Bengali	H গজ / হাতি (gôj / hāti)	elephant
Bulgarian	О офицер	officer
Catalan	A alfil	elephant
Chinese	B 象 (xiàng)	elephant / 象
Czech	S střelec	shooter
Danish	L løber	runner
Dutch	L loper / raadsheer	runner / counsellor
English	B bishop	
Esperanto	K kuriero	courier
Estonian	O oda	spear
Finnish	L lähetti	messenger
French	F fou	jester
Galician	B bispo	bishop
Georgian	კ კუ (ku)	tortoise
German	L Läufer	runner
Greek	Α αξιωματικός (axiomatikós)	officer
Hindi	O ऊँट (ūṁṭ)	camel
Hebrew	ר רץ (Rats)	runner Medieval: פיל (Pil), elephant
Hausa	G giwa	elephant
Hungarian	F futó	runner
Icelandic	B biskup	bishop
Ido	E episkopo	bishop
Indonesian	G gajah	elephant
Interslavic	L lovec	hunter
Irish	E easpag	bishop
Italian	A alfiere	ensign
Japanese	B ビショップ (bishoppu) / 角 角行 (kakugyō)	bishop / angle-mover
Javanese	M mentri	minister
Kannada	ಆ ಆನೆ (aane)	elephant
Kabardian	Пл пыл (pyl)	elephant
Kazakh	П піл (pıl)	elephant
Korean	B 비숍 (bi syob)	
Latin	S signifer / cursor / stultus / alphinus	standard-bearer / messenger / fool
Latvian	L laidnis	
Lithuanian	R rikis	Lithuanian military commander
Luxembourgish	L Leefer	runner
Macedonian	L ловец	hunter
Malayalam	B ആന (aana)	elephant
Marathi	O उंट (Unṭ)	camel
Mongolian	Т тэмээ (temee)	camel
Norwegian Bokmål	L løper	runner
Norwegian Nynorsk	L løpar	runner
Odia	B ହାତୀ (hati)	elephant
Oromo
Persian	ف فیل	elephant
Polish	G goniec / laufer	courier / (ger. derived)
Portuguese	B bispo	bishop
Romanian	N nebun	fool
Russian	С слон (slon)	elephant
Scottish Gaelic	E easbaig	bishop
Serbo-Croatian	L lovac / strijelac / laufer (Л ловац / стрелац / лауфер)	hunter / archer / runner
Northern Sotho	Mp Mopišopo	bishop
Sicilian	A alferu	elephant
Slovak	S strelec	shooter
Slovene	L lovec	hunter
Spanish	A alfil	elephant
Swedish	L löpare	runner
Tamil	B அமைச்சர் / மந்திரி (amaicchar / manthiri)	minister
Telugu	శకటు (śakaţu)	
Thai	ค โคน (khon)	
Turkish	F fil	elephant
Ukrainian	C слон (slon)	elephant
Urdu	فيلہ (fīlah)	elephant
Uzbek	F fil	elephant
Vietnamese	T tượng / tịnh / voi	elephant
Welsh	E esgob	bishop

== Unicode ==
Unicode defines three codepoints for a bishop:

♗ U+2657 White Chess Bishop

♝ U+265D Black Chess Bishop

🨃 U+1FA03 Neutral Chess Bishop

== See also ==
- Bishop and knight checkmate
- Chess endgame
- Chess piece
- Chess piece relative value
- (the) Exchange – a bishop (or knight) for a rook
- Opposite-colored bishops endgame
- Rules of chess
- Staunton chess set
- Wrong bishop – a bishop may be on the wrong color
- Wrong rook pawn
