= Wrong bishop =

Situation in chess endgame

Position: b8 black king, a6 white king, a5 white pawn, c5 white bishop

A wrong bishop in the situation of king, bishop, and rook pawn versus king

In a chess endgame, a wrong bishop is a bishop that would have been better placed on the opposite square color. This most commonly occurs with a bishop and one of its rook pawns, but it also occurs with a rook versus a bishop, a rook and one rook pawn versus a bishop, and possibly with a rook and one bishop pawn versus a bishop.

== Rook versus bishop ==
V. Platov, 1925

Position: h8 black king, a7 white rook, e5 white king, h4 black bishop

White wins because Black has the wrong bishop.

White wins in this position. The defender has the wrong bishop if it is on the same color as the corner where his king is confined. Black's bishop is on the wrong color of square for it to form a fortress in the corner (i.e. with the black king on the h8-square and the bishop on the g8- or h7-square). White wins:

1. Kf5! Kg8
2. Ra4!! The only way to win. If 2.Kg6? Kf8 and the black king is able to get out of the "dangerous corner" or "wrong corner" and head to a "safe corner" or "right corner" where he can set up the fortress.
2... Be1
3. Kg6 Kf8
4. Rf4+!, followed by 5. Re4, winning.

== Rook pawn ==
There are some situations involving a rook pawn and the wrong bishop.

=== Bishop and rook pawn ===
Müller & Lamprecht

Position: a8 black king, e7 white bishop, a6 white pawn, b6 white king

White has the wrong bishop, draw with either side to move

In an endgame with a bishop and a rook pawn, the wrong bishop is one that does not control the promotion square of the pawn. This position is a draw with either side to move. Black simply keeps his king on the a8-, a7-, or b8-squares (or b7 if the pawn advances) to keep the pawn from promoting. A draw because of stalemate is also possible. If the bishop were on the other color it could force the black king out of the corner through a check and the pawn would promote and a win would follow easily.

=== Rook and rook pawn versus bishop ===
Bernhard von Guretzky-Cornitz

Position: h6 black king, h5 white pawn, h4 white king, h3 white rook, d2 black bishop

White wins, the bishop is on the wrong color.

A rook and a rook pawn always win against the wrong bishop, as in this position. The defender has the wrong bishop if it is the one on the same color as the pawn's promotion square. The winning procedure is to give up the pawn at the right time to get to a winning rook versus bishop endgame. If the bishop was on the other color, the defender may be able to form a fortress in the corner, as mentioned above.

== Rook and bishop pawn versus bishop ==
de la Villa, diagram 13.19

Position: f8 black king, b7 white rook, f6 white pawn, e5 white king, c4 black bishop

Black to move draws.

With a rook and a bishop pawn on the sixth rank versus a bishop, the bishop may be on the right color or the wrong color. In one case the rook and pawn win; in the other the bishop is able to draw. In this position Black is able to draw because his bishop is on the right color:

1... Be2
2. Kf4 Bc4
3. Kg5 Bd5!
4. Rc7 Ba2!
5. Kg6 Bb1+!
6. Kh6 Ba2!
7. Ra7 Bc4

and there is no way for White to make progress. This type of position was studied by Ercole del Rio around 1750. This case is similar to the case with a rook pawn (above), which also may be a draw.

=== Examples from games ===
Szabó vs. Botvinnik, 1952

Position: c8 black bishop, f8 black king, h7 black pawn, f6 white pawn, a5 white pawn, e5 white knight, g5 white rook, g4 white pawn, a3 black rook, d2 white king

Position before 51...Rxa5!

Position: f8 black king, a7 white rook, f6 white pawn, g5 white king, c4 black bishop

Position after 59...Bc4

In this 1952 game between László Szabó and World Champion Mikhail Botvinnik, Black was defending two pawns down – a position that would normally be a win for White. Botvinnik saw an opportunity to exchange his rook for a knight and two pawns and reach a drawn position (even without his pawn). The game continued:

51... Rxa5!
52. Nd7+ Bxd7
53. Rxa5 Bxg4
54. Ke3 Be6
55. Kf4 Bc4
56. Ra7 h5
57. Kg5 h4
58. Kxh4 Bb3
59. Kg5 Bc4

and reached the second position, which had been analyzed as a draw.

White was not able to make any progress. He promoted his pawn on move 76 and it was immediately captured by Black, resulting in a rook versus bishop endgame (see pawnless chess endings#Common pawnless endings (rook and minor pieces)) that was drawn two moves later.

Miladinovic vs. Beliavsky, 2001

Position: d6 white bishop, f5 black king, g4 black pawn, b3 black rook, f3 white pawn, g3 white king

Black to move

Position: c5 white bishop, g3 black king, e2 white king, f2 black pawn, h2 black rook

Position after 127.Bc5, draw

In this game between Igor Miladinović and Alexander Beliavsky, Black could have won by 99... Rxf3+, but instead played 99... gxf3?, reaching the theoretically-drawn position.

99... gxf3?
100. Bc5 Ke4
101. Kf2 Rc3
102. Ba7 Rc7
103. Bb6 Rc2+
104. Kf1 Rc6 (if 104...f2 then 105.Kg2! draws)
105. Ba7 Ra6
106. Bc5 Kf4
107. Bd4 Ra4
108. Bc5 Rc4
109. Ba7 Rb4
110. Bc5

The game was drawn on move 127.

== Rook and pawn versus bishop and pawn ==
From Hawkins, p. 104

Position: c6 black king, e6 black rook, d5 black pawn, d4 white pawn, d3 white king, f3 white bishop

Draw

Position: c6 black king, e6 black rook, d5 black pawn, e5 white bishop, d4 white pawn, d3 white king

Black wins

In this type of position when the pawns are facing each other and blocked, the result often depends on which color the bishop is on. If the bishop is on the same color as its pawn, the rook almost always wins. If the bishop is on the color of the opposing pawn it has good drawing chances.
