= Rook (chess) =

Chess piece

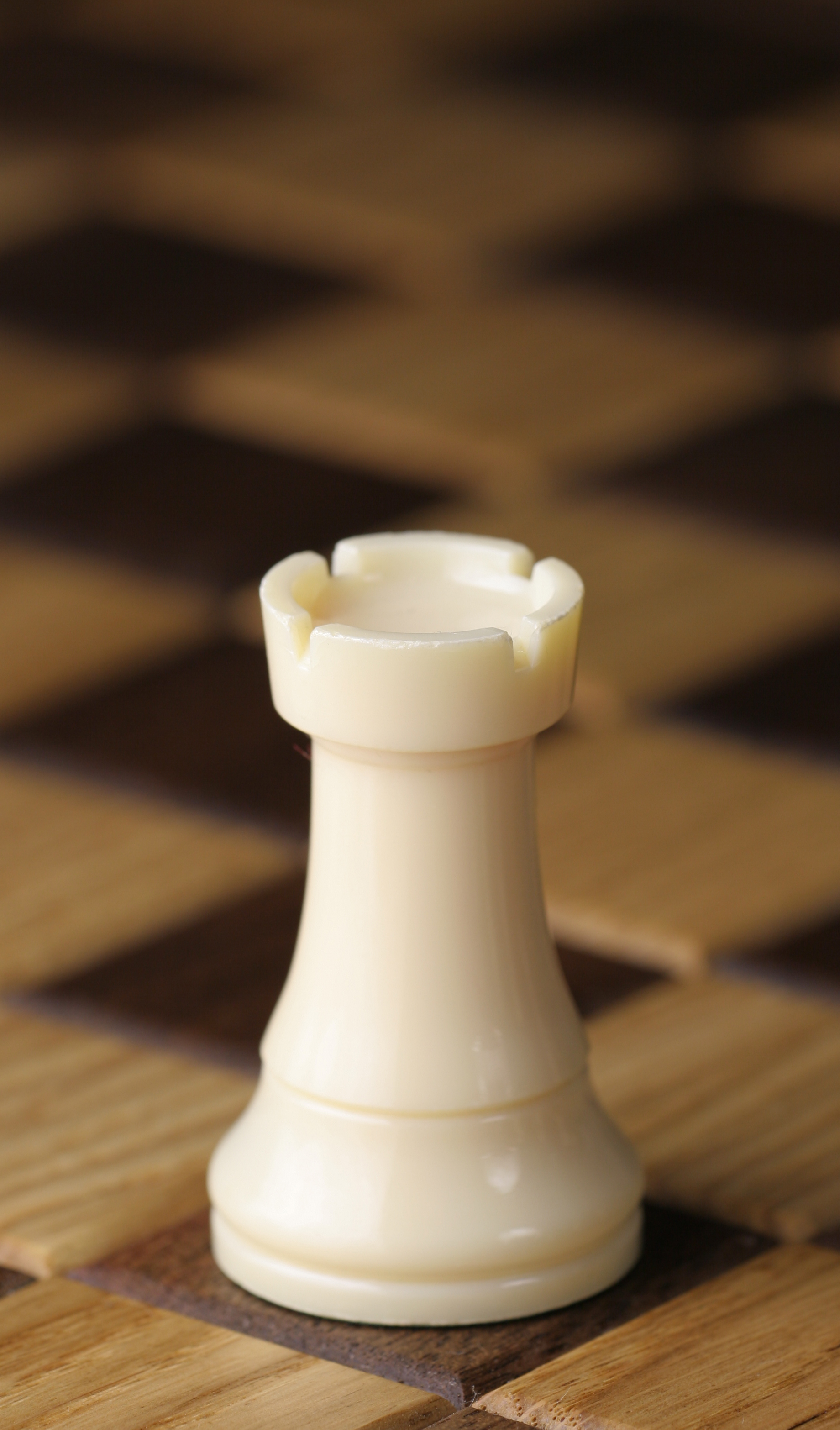
White rook

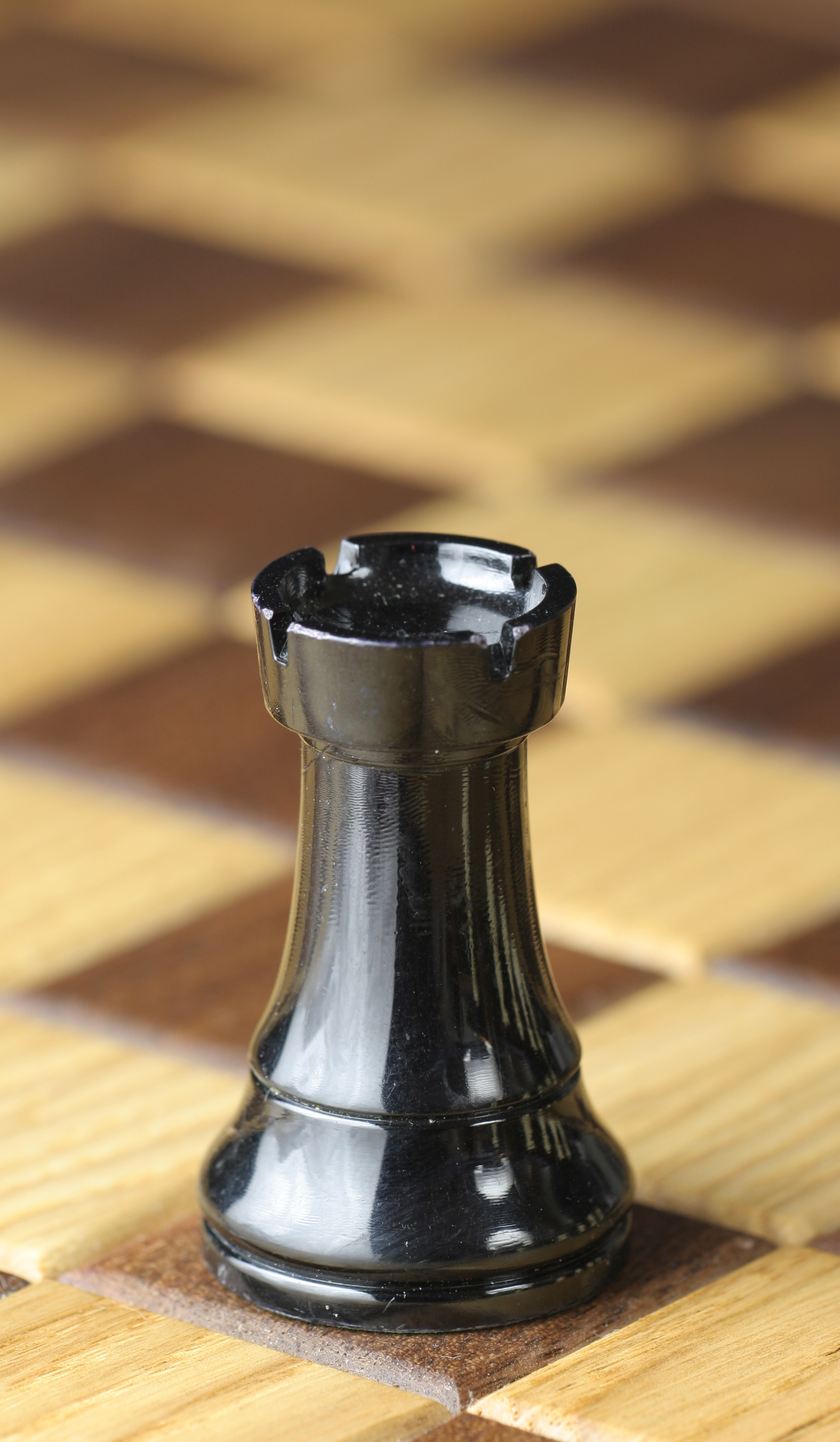
Black rook

The rook (/rʊk/; ♖, ♜) is a piece in the game of chess. Each player starts the game with two rooks, one in each corner on their side of the board. It may move any number of squares horizontally or vertically without jumping, and it may capture an enemy piece on its path; it may participate in castling.

Formerly, the rook (from Persian: رخ, romanized: rokh/rukh, lit. 'chariot') was alternatively called the tower, marquess, rector, and comes (count or earl). The term "castle" is considered to be informal or old-fashioned.

== Placement and movement ==
Position: a8 black rook, h8 black rook, a1 white rook, h1 white rook

Starting positions of the rooks

Position: d8 white circle, g8 black circle, d7 white circle, e7 white pawn, f7 black circle, g7 black rook, h7 black circle, d6 white circle, g6 black circle, d5 white circle, g5 black pawn, a4 white circle, b4 white circle, c4 white circle, d4 white rook, e4 white circle, f4 white circle, g4 white circle, h4 white circle, d3 white circle, d2 white circle, d1 white circle

The white rook can move to any square marked with a white dot. The black rook can move to squares with black dots, or it can capture the pawn on e7.

The white rooks start on the squares a1 and h1, while the black rooks start on a8 and h8. The rook moves horizontally or vertically, through any number of unoccupied squares. The rook cannot jump over pieces. The rook may capture an enemy piece by moving to the square on which the enemy piece stands, removing it from play. The rook also participates with the king in a special move called castling, in which it is transferred to the square crossed by the king after the king is shifted two squares toward the rook.

== Strategy ==
=== Relative value ===
The rook is worth about five pawns. In general, rooks are stronger than bishops or knights and are considered greater in value than either of those pieces by nearly two pawns, but less valuable than two minor pieces by approximately a pawn. Two rooks are generally considered to be worth slightly more than a queen (see chess piece relative value). Winning a rook for a bishop or knight is referred to as winning the exchange. Rooks and queens are called major pieces or heavy pieces, as opposed to bishops and knights, the minor pieces.

=== Development ===
In the opening, the rooks are blocked in by other pieces and cannot immediately participate in the game, so it is usually desirable to connect one's rooks on the first rank by castling and then clearing all pieces except the king and rooks from the first rank. In that position, the rooks support each other and can more easily move to occupy and control the most favorable files.

A common strategic goal is to develop a rook on the first rank of an open file (i.e., one unobstructed by pawns of either player) or a half-open file (i.e., one unobstructed by friendly pawns). From this position, the rook is relatively unexposed to risk but can exert control on every square on the file. If one file is particularly important, a player might advance one rook on it, then position the other rook behind—doubling the rooks. Having both rooks on the same file is known as a battery and can be very deadly, especially if the queen joins in as well (see Alekhine's Gun).

A rook on the seventh rank (the opponent's second rank) is typically very powerful, as it threatens the opponent's unadvanced pawns and hems in the enemy king. A rook on the seventh rank is often considered sufficient compensation for a pawn. In the diagrammed position from a game between Lev Polugaevsky and Larry Evans, the rook on the seventh rank enables White to draw, despite being a pawn down.

Two rooks on the seventh rank are often enough to force victory by the blind swine mate, or at least a draw by perpetual check.

A white rook on the 7th rank

Position: g8 black king, b7 black pawn, d7 white rook, g7 black pawn, a6 black pawn, c6 black pawn, a5 white pawn, f5 black pawn, b4 black rook, e3 white pawn, f2 white king, g2 white pawn, h2 white pawn

White to move, draws.
Polugaevsky vs. Evans, 1970
Connected black rooks on the 7th rank

Position: a7 black pawn, b7 black pawn, e7 white rook, h7 black pawn, e6 white knight, f6 black king, g6 black bishop, d5 white pawn, f5 black pawn, b4 white bishop, h4 black pawn, a2 white pawn, b2 white pawn, d2 black rook, e2 black rook, h2 white pawn, f1 white rook, h1 white king

Black to move, 32...Rxh2+ and White resigns, seeing that 33.Kg1 Rdg2#.
Chigorin vs. Steinitz, Havana 1892

=== Endgame ===
Rooks are most powerful towards the end of a game (i.e., the endgame), when they can move unobstructed by pawns and control large numbers of squares. They have trouble restraining enemy pawns from advancing towards promotion unless they occupy the file behind them. In addition to this, a rook best supports a friendly pawn towards promotion from behind it on the same file (see Tarrasch rule).

In a position with a rook and one or two minor pieces versus two rooks, generally in addition to pawns, and possibly other pieces, Lev Alburt advises that the player with the single rook should avoid exchanging the rook for one of his opponent's rooks.

The rook is adept at delivering checkmate. Below are a few examples of rook checkmates that are easy to force. A single rook can force checkmate while a single minor piece cannot.

Position: b8 white rook, g8 black king, g6 white king

A king and rook mate. The king and rook work together to force the enemy king to the edge of the board, where it can be checkmated.

Position: g8 black king, f7 black pawn, g7 black pawn, h7 black pawn, g5 white rook, f2 white pawn, g2 white pawn, h2 white pawn, b1 black rook, g1 white king

A back rank checkmate

Position: b8 white rook, g8 black king, d7 white rook, e2 white king

A two-rook checkmate or the "ladder checkmate"

== Dimensions and design ==
The rook is the second shortest chess piece after the pawn. Typically a rook is similar in appearance to a small castle or tower; thus, the rook is sometimes called "castle" and "tower", though modern chess literature rarely, if ever, uses those terms.

== History ==
In the medieval shatranj, the rook symbolized a chariot. The Persian word rukh means 'chariot', as does the name of the corresponding piece in the original Indian version, chaturanga, ratha. In modern times, it is mostly known as हाथी (elephant) to Hindi-speaking players, while East Asian chess games such as xiangqi and shogi have names also meaning chariot (車) for the same piece.

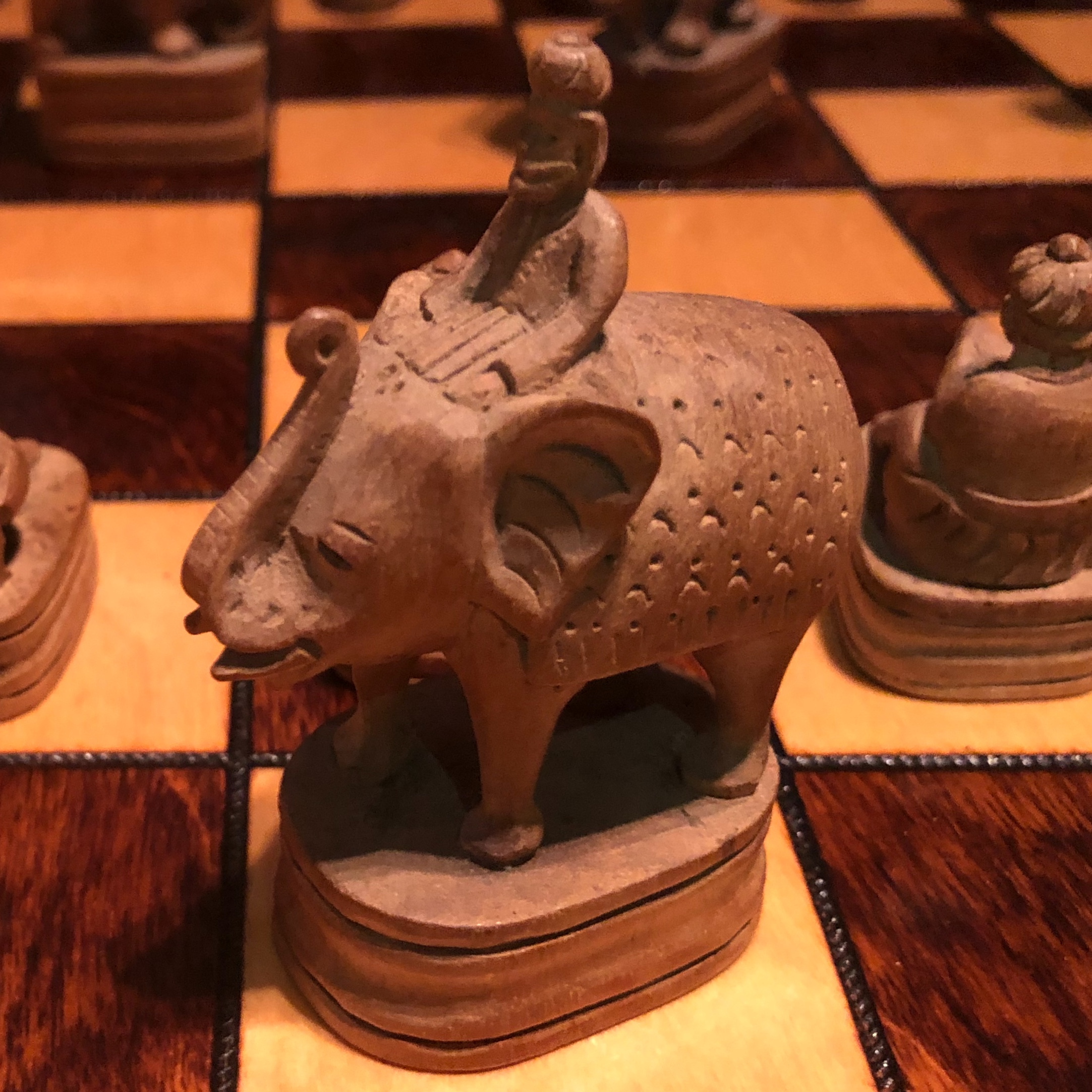
Antique Indian Mughal chess elephant made from sandalwood representing the rook

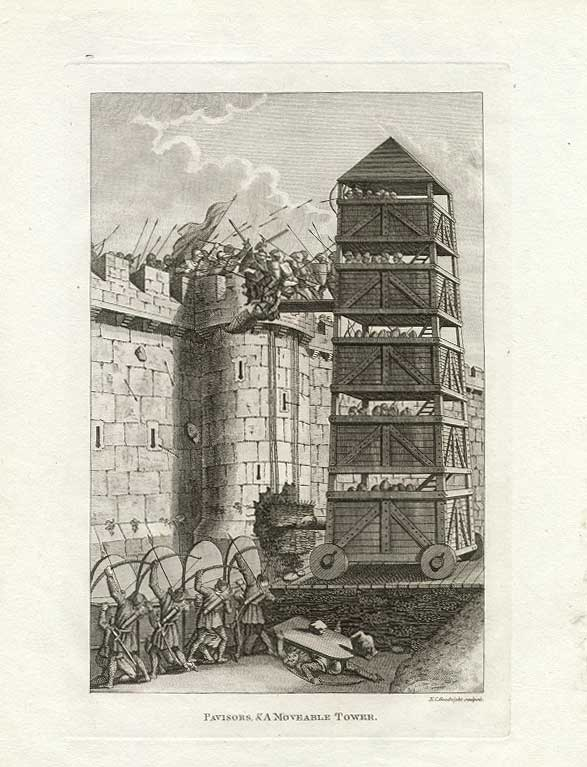
19th-century illustration of a siege tower, which the rook may be intended to represent

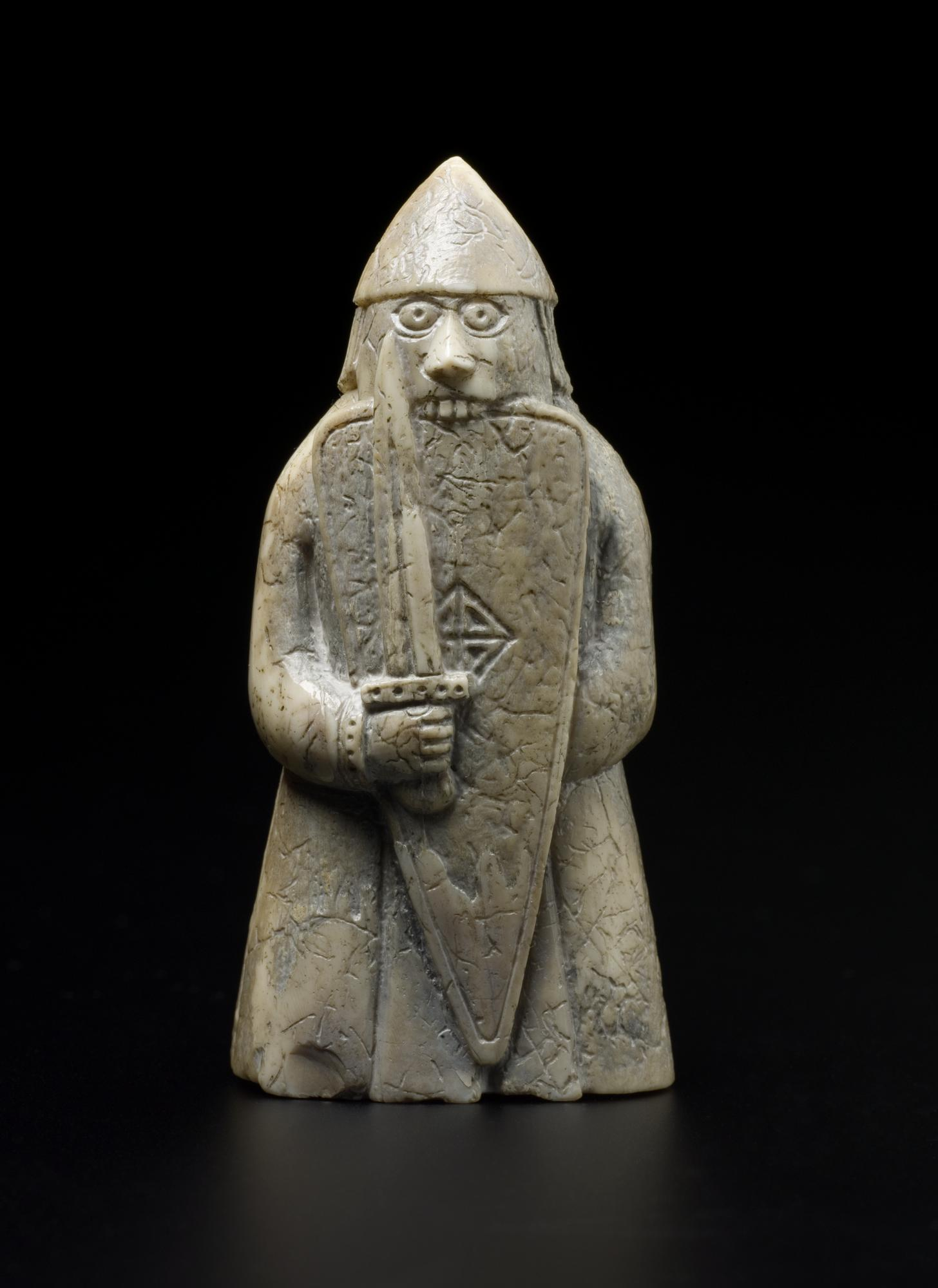
The berserker used as a rook in the Lewis chessmen

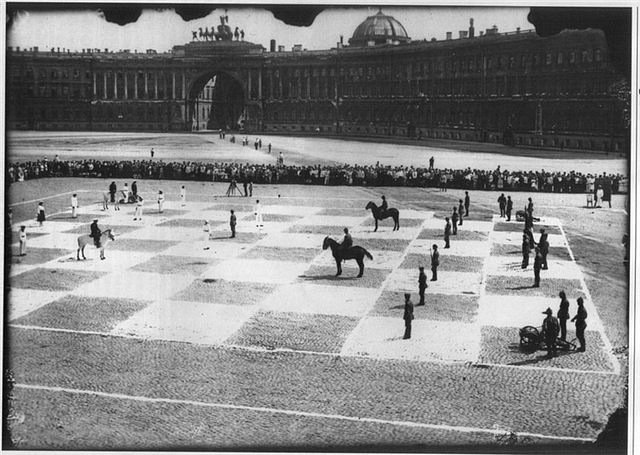
Game of human chess in St Petersburg, 1924. The rook is represented by a cannon, as many Eastern European languages call it by that name.

Persian war chariots were heavily armored, carrying a driver and at least one ranged-weapon bearer, such as an archer. The sides of the chariot were built to resemble fortified stone work, giving the impression of small, mobile buildings, causing terror on the battlefield.

In Europe, the castle or tower appears for the first time in the 16th century in Vida's 1550 Ludus Scacchia, and then as a tower on the back of an elephant. In time, the elephant disappeared and only the tower was used as the piece.

In the West, the rook is almost universally represented as a crenellated turret. The piece is called torre ('tower') in Italian, Portuguese, Catalan and Spanish; tour in French; toren in Dutch; Turm in German; torn in Swedish; and torni in Finnish. In Hungarian, it is bástya ('bastion') and in Hebrew, it is called צריח (tsariʾaḥ, meaning 'turret'). In the British Museum's collection of the medieval Lewis chess pieces, the rooks appear as stern warders, or wild-eyed berserker warriors.

In some languages, the rook is called a ship: Thai เรือ (reūa), Armenian Նավակ (navak), Russian ладья (ladya), Javanese ꦥꦿꦲꦸ (prahu). This may be because of the use of an Arabic style V-shaped rook piece, which some may have mistaken for a ship. It is possible that the rendition comes from Sanskrit roka (ship); however, no chaturanga pieces were ever called a roka. Murray argued that the Javanese could not visualize a chariot moving through the jungles in sweeping fashion as the rook. The only vehicle that moved in straight fashion was a ship, thus they replaced it with prahu. Murray, however, did not give an explanation why the Russians call the piece a "ship".

Peter Tyson suggests that there is a correlation between the name of the piece and the word rukh, a mythical giant bird of prey from Persian mythology.

In South Slavic languages, it is called the "cannon" (Serbo-Croatian: Топ, romanized: top).

In Kannada, it is known as ಆನೆ (āāne), meaning 'elephant'. This is unusual, as the term for elephant is in many other languages applied to the bishop.

=== Name translations ===
Overview of chess piece names
Language	Rook	Translation
Adyghe	Къ къалэ / къошъожъый (qale / qoshwozhyy)	fortress / boat
Afrikaans	T Toring	tower
Albanian	T Torra	tower
Arabic	ر رخ / طابية (rukhkh / ṭābiya)	fortress / castle
Azerbaijani	T Top	cannon
Armenian	Ն Նավակ (Navak)	ship
Basque	G Gaztelua	castle
Belarusian (Taraškievica)	Лд ладзьдзя	boat
Bengali	N নৌকা (noukā)	Boat
Bulgarian	Т топ	cannon
Catalan	T torre	tower
Chinese	R 車 (jū)	chariot / 车
Czech	V věž	tower
Danish	T tårn	tower
Dutch	T toren / kasteel	tower / castle
English	R rook, castle	
Esperanto	T turo	tower
Estonian	V vanker	chariot / carriage
Finnish	T torni	tower
French	T tour	tower
Galician	T torre	tower
Georgian	ე ეტლი (etli)	chariot
German	T Turm	tower
Greek	Π πύργος (pýrgos)	tower
Hindi	H हाथी (hāthī)	elephant
Hebrew	צ צריח (Tsari'aẖ)	tower
Hausa	R sansanin	fortress
Hungarian	B bástya	bastion
Icelandic	H hrókur	rook
Ido	T turmo	tower
Indonesian	B benteng	castle / fortress
Interslavic	Z zamok / věža	castle / tower
Irish	C caiseal	bulwark
Italian	T torre	tower
Japanese	R ルーク (rūku) / 飛 飛車 (hisha)	
Javanese	B bèntèng	fortress
Kannada	ರ ರಥ (ratha)	chariot
Kabardian	Къ къалэ / кхъуафэжьей (qale / qhwafezhey)	fortress / boat
Kazakh	Т тура (tura)	tower
Korean	R 룩 (rug)	
Latin	T turris / elephas	tower / elephant
Latvian	T tornis	tower
Lithuanian	B bokštas	tower
Luxembourgish	T Tuerm	tower
Macedonian	T топ	cannon
Malayalam	R തേര് (therú)	chariot
Marathi	H हत्ती (hātti)	elephant
Mongolian	т тэрэг (tereg)	chariot
Norwegian Bokmål	T tårn	tower
Norwegian Nynorsk	T tårn	tower
Odia	R ଡଙ୍ଗା (ḍôṅga)	boat
Oromo
Persian	ق/ر قلعه/رخ	castle
Polish	W wieża	tower
Portuguese	T torre	tower
Romanian	T turn / tură	tower
Russian	Л ладья (ladya)	boat
Scottish Gaelic	T tùr	tower
Serbo-Croatian	T top / kula (Т топ / кула)	cannon / tower
Northern Sotho	N Ntlosebô / Moshate	
Sicilian	T turru	tower
Slovak	V veža	tower
Slovene	T trdnjava	castle
Spanish	T torre	tower
Swedish	T torn	tower
Tamil	R கோட்டை (kōṭṭai)	castle
Telugu	ఏనుగు (ēnugu)	elephant
Thai	ร เรือ (ruea)	ship
Turkish	K kale	castle
Ukrainian	T тура (tura)	tower
Urdu	رخ (rukh)	
Uzbek	R rux	
Vietnamese	X xe	chariot
Welsh	C castell	castle

== Heraldry ==
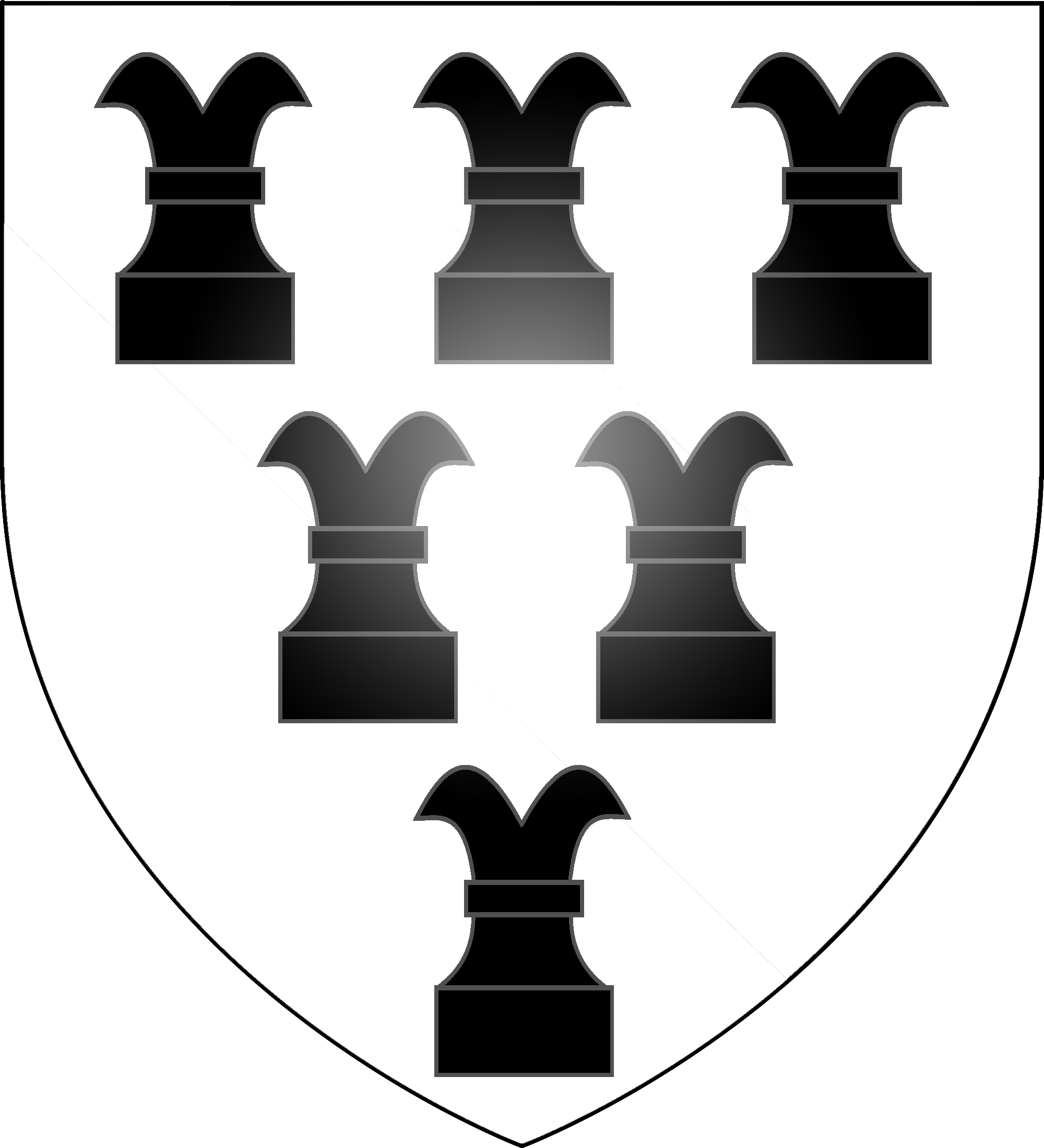
Arms of the English family of Rookwood, featuring chess rooks as a cant on the name

Chess rooks frequently occur as heraldic charges. Heraldic rooks are usually shown as they looked in medieval chess sets, with the usual battlements replaced by two outward-curving horns. They occur in arms from around the 13th century onwards.

In Canadian heraldry, the chess rook is the cadency mark of a fifth daughter.

== Unicode ==
Unicode defines three codepoints for a rook:

♖ U+2656 White Chess Rook

♜ U+265C Black Chess Rook

🨂 U+1FA02 Neutral Chess Rook

== See also ==
- Lucena position – winning position
- Philidor position – drawing position
- Rook and pawn versus rook endgame
- Tarrasch rule – rooks belong behind passed pawns
