= Tarrasch rule =

General principle in chess

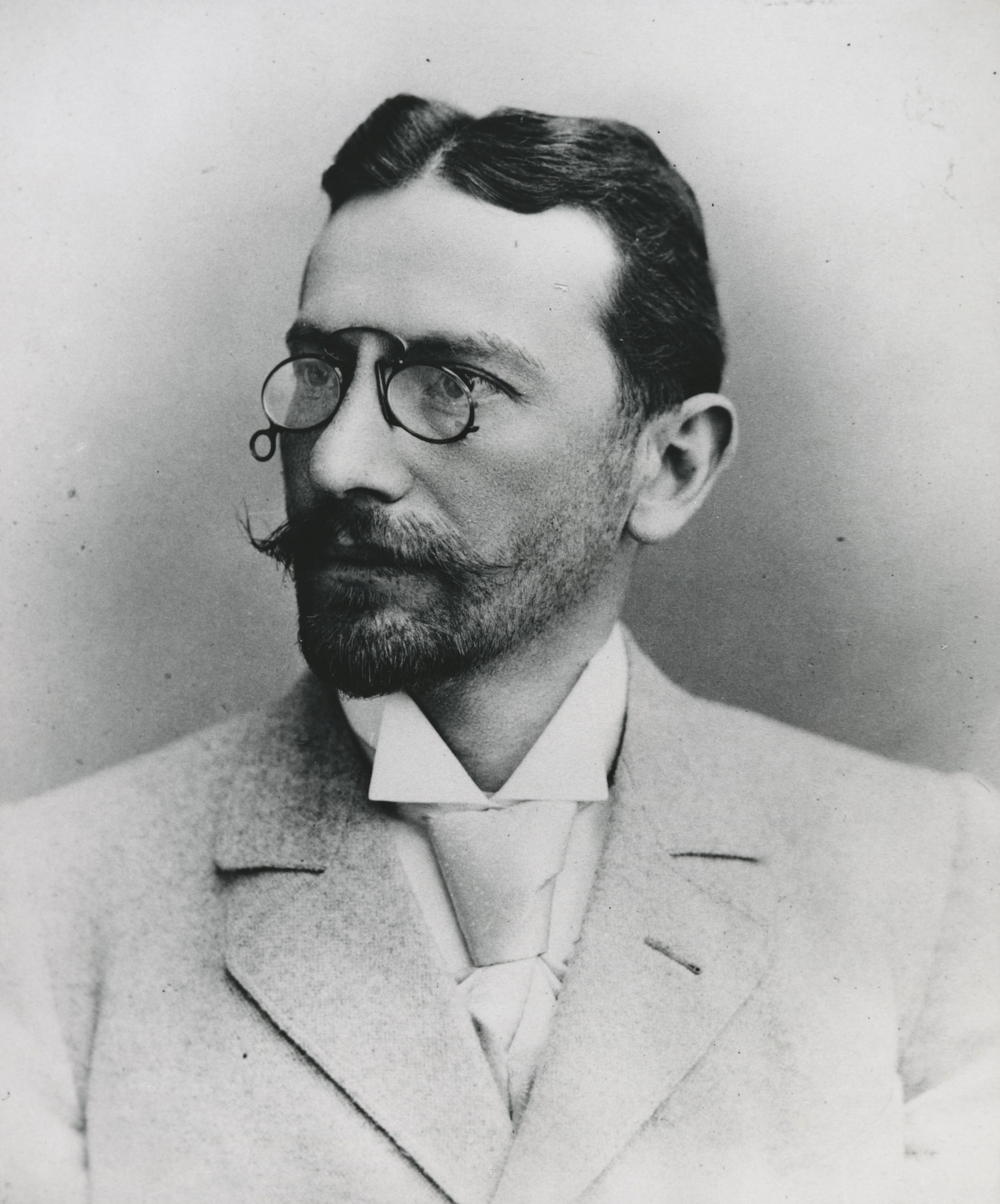
Siegbert Tarrasch

The Tarrasch rule is a general principle that applies in the majority of chess middlegames and endgames. Siegbert Tarrasch (1862–1934) stated the "rule" that rooks should be placed behind passed pawns – either the player's or the opponent's. The idea behind the guideline is that (1) if a player's rook is behind their own passed pawn, the rook protects it as it advances, and (2) if it is behind an opponent's passed pawn, the pawn cannot advance unless it is protected along its way.

The original quote came from his famous book about the St. Petersburg 1914 chess tournament, which was translated into English in 1993:

The rooks belong behind passed pawns, behind their own in order to support their advance, behind the enemy's in order to impede their advance.

He referred to his rule 24 years later on page 57 of his book The Game of Chess (1938) as:

In complicated Rook endings the most important rule is one laid down by the author: The Rook's place is behind the passed pawn; behind the enemy pawn in order to hold it up, behind one's own in order to support its advance.

This "rule" is usually true, but not always, as there are many exceptions. Tarrasch has been quoted as saying, "Always put the rook behind the pawn... Except when it is incorrect to do so."

== Rationale ==
Position: b8 black rook, g8 white rook, b5 white pawn, g4 black pawn, b1 white rook, g1 black rook

The diagram shows two cases. On the b-file, White's rook is behind the pawn, while Black's is in front of it. Other things being equal, Black cannot do much to stop the pawn's advance. The rook can block it, but as soon as the rook moves elsewhere, the pawn can advance. In addition, as the pawn advances, the space available for the black rook continues to shrink, while the range of the white rook increases. Thus, a rook is better placed behind one's own passed pawn.

In the case on the g-file, roles are reversed: White's rook is behind Black's pawn while Black's rook is in front. As the pawn advances, White's rook has more freedom of movement, while Black's becomes ever more constrained. White cannot actively block the pawn, but if Black wishes to promote, Black must at some point move the rook off the g-file, leaving the pawn en prise if there is no other support. Thus, a rook is better-placed behind an enemy passed pawn.

== Illustrations ==
Here are two positions to illustrate the principle.

=== Rook behind own passed pawn: usually a win ===
Alekhine vs. Capablanca, game 34, 1927

Position: f7 black pawn, g7 black king, a6 black rook, g6 black pawn, h6 black pawn, a5 white pawn, a4 white rook, h4 white pawn, g3 white pawn, f2 white pawn, g2 white king

Position after 54.Rf4–a4. Rook behind its own passed pawn.

In the first diagram, White's rook is behind his passed pawn on the a-file, and the position is won for White.

The winning technique is straightforward:

1. Move the king towards the passed pawn. The defending king must also move that way, otherwise he will be forced to give up his rook for the pawn.
2. If the attacking king can penetrate no further because the defending king is in opposition, use tempo moves by the rook up and down the file. Once pawn moves are exhausted, then the defender runs out of options and is in zugzwang.
3. If the defending rook retreats, then advance the pawn. The defender cannot keep up this strategy. If the defending king sidesteps away from the pawn, the attacking king moves towards the pawn, and forces its advance. The defender will have to give up his rook. So the only option is for the defending king to move towards the pawn.
4. The attacking king penetrates the kingside pawn structure as far as possible. If the defender wins the passed pawn, an exchange of rooks ensues and the resulting pawn ending is an easy win for the attacker.
5. At the right moment, the attacking rook abandons the pawn and joins in the attack on the kingside pawns.

The 34th game of the 1927 World Championship match between Alekhine and Capablanca is a classic example of the technique (or see annotated text). The position is after White's 54.Ra4. White won on move 82.

=== Rook behind enemy passed pawn: usually a draw ===
Mecking vs. Korchnoi, 1974

Position: f7 black pawn, g7 black pawn, h7 black king, c6 white rook, h6 black pawn, a5 black pawn, a4 black rook, g3 white pawn, f2 white pawn, h2 white pawn, g1 white king

Rook behind enemy passed pawn. Position is after White's 35th move; drawn on move 55.

Similar positions with the rook behind the enemy passed pawn are usually a draw, but not always. The next position is after White's 35th move in the eighth game of the Henrique Mecking versus Victor Korchnoi Candidates Quarterfinal match in 1974. White will move Ra6 as soon as possible. Black's rook is in front of his passed pawn on the a-file, and the game ended in a draw on move 55.

Anand vs. Kramnik, 2007

Position: g8 black king, a7 black pawn, b7 white rook, g7 black pawn, f6 black pawn, h6 black pawn, f5 white pawn, a3 black rook, g2 white pawn, h2 white pawn, g1 white king

Position after 35...Rxa3. Rook in front of its passed pawn, opposing rook will get behind the pawn. The game was drawn 30 moves later.

In this game between Viswanathan Anand and Vladimir Kramnik from the 2007 World Chess Championship, Black's rook is in front of his passed pawn; the white rook will get behind the pawn:

36. Kf2 h5
37. g3 a5
38. Ra7

Black advanced the pawn to a2, but could do no better than to exchange the passed pawn and rook for the white rook, reaching a king and pawn endgame that ended in a draw on move 65.

Unzicker vs. Lundin, 1954

Position: a8 white rook, a6 white pawn, f6 black pawn, g6 black pawn, h5 black pawn, e4 black king, h4 white pawn, a3 black rook, g3 white pawn, e2 white king, f2 white pawn

Rook behind enemy passed pawn. White to move wins.

In the position from a game between Wolfgang Unzicker and Erik Lundin, White to move wins, however 48. f3+! is the only winning move. If the black pawn were still on f7, the black king could go back to f6 or g7 and the position would be a draw. (If 48.a7? Ra2+ and 49...Kf3 draws.)

==== New analysis ====
Position: g7 black king, h7 black pawn, g6 black pawn, a5 white rook, f5 black pawn, a4 white pawn, a3 black rook, g3 white pawn, h3 white pawn, f2 white pawn, g2 white king

Rook behind enemy passed pawn

The reason this type of position was long thought to be an easy draw is as follows:

1. White cannot advance his pawn to the seventh rank, because that would deprive his king of any shelter.
2. So White must advance his pawn only up to the sixth, so the king can find shelter on a7.
3. White's only real winning attempt was to move his king up to a7. Then he can play Rb8–b6, Kb7, a7 (threatening Ra6), forcing Black to give up his rook for the pawn.
4. But while White is spending all this time, Black's rook can win White's kingside pawns, then advance the newly made passed pawns.
5. It has been known for White to even lose this battle of rook versus many passed pawns.
6. Thus if White tries too hard to win, he may actually lose.

Recent theoretical analysis of this position shows that White has a strong maneuver:

1. Advance the pawn to the sixth rank.
2. Move the king towards the queenside.
3. When the black rook takes a kingside pawn, switch the rook to guarding the pawn from the c-file, i.e. Rc7 then advance the pawn to a7.
4. Switch the white rook to the a-file with gain of tempo. Thus Black is forced to sacrifice his rook for the pawn without White having to move his king all the way to a7. These many extra tempi make the difference between winning and drawing or even losing.

Black must play very carefully to draw, rather than the straightforward draw that was previously assumed.

V. Kantorovich, 1988
and J. Steckner, 2003

Position: a7 white rook, f7 black pawn, a6 white pawn, f6 black king, g6 black pawn, h5 black pawn, h4 white pawn, e3 white king, g3 white pawn, a2 black rook, f2 white pawn

Until 2003, this position was thought to be an easy draw.

Kantorovich analyzed the position in the diagram on the right and thought that Black draws with two tempi to spare. In 2003 Steckner found an improvement for White. Black's pieces are in their optimum positions: the rook is behind the a-pawn and attacking the f-pawn and the king is in its most active location. If 1.Ra8 Kf5 Black has an easy draw; however, White has a better plan which wins unless Black answers with 1... g5:

1. Kd4!

The f-pawn can be sacrificed. If taken, black allows the white rook to move from a7.

1... Rxf2?? 2. Rc7! Ra2 3. a7

3.Rc6+ leads to a draw.

3... Kf5 4. Kc4!!

The old analysis was 4.Rxf7+, leading to a draw.

4... Kg4 5. Kb3! Ra6 6. Rc4+ Kxg3 7. Ra4 Rxa7 8. Rxa7 Kxh4 9. Kc3 Kg3 10. Kd2 h4 11. Ke2 Kg2 12. Rxf7 h3 13. Rf2+ Kg3 14. Rf6

and White wins.

Aronian vs. Ivanchuk, 2008

Position: b7 white rook, f7 black pawn, e6 black king, g6 black pawn, b5 white pawn, h5 black pawn, h4 white pawn, g3 white pawn, b2 black rook, f2 white pawn, e1 white king

Position after 46.Ke1

This 2008 game between Levon Aronian and Vassily Ivanchuk ended in a draw after 62 moves. The evaluation of this type of position with an extra b-pawn is still in flux as of 2010, but current theory is that it is drawish.

== Exceptions ==
Purdy

Position: d8 black rook, b5 black pawn, a4 black king, e4 white king, b1 white rook

White to move draws by repeatedly checking from the first rank.

There are exceptions to the Tarrasch rule. Here are some.

- Yuri Averbakh said that the Tarrasch rule is usually correct when only the rooks are battling over the pawn, but when the pawn is blocked by the opposing king, the rook is normally better protecting the pawn from the side.
- In the rook and pawn versus rook endgame, if the defending king is cut off from the pawn's file and the pawn is not beyond its fourth rank, then the best place for the defending rook is often in front of the pawn. See the frontal defense.
- On a similar note, Cecil Purdy said that a rook is best behind its passed pawn if it is on the fifth rank or higher, or can reach those ranks. If the pawn is held up before the fifth rank, the rook is better in front of the pawn. Often the rook is best protecting the pawn from the side if it is on the fifth rank or higher.
- In the ending of a rook and pawn versus a rook, where the pawn is a knight pawn (b- or g-file), the defending king is in front of the pawn, but the defender cannot get his rook to the third rank for the drawing Philidor position, the defending rook draws on its first rank but loses if it is attacking the pawn from behind.
- In the ending of a rook and two isolated pawns versus a rook, it is generally better for the stronger side to protect the pawns from the side.
- If the pawn is a rook pawn it is often better for the rook to attack it from the side, especially in a rook and pawn versus rook position. (See the Vančura position.)
- If a rook is in front of its passed pawn, it is often best for the defending rook to attack from the side. In fact, it is sometimes best to switch the defending rook from behind the pawn to the side.
- In the ending of a rook versus a pawn or pawns, the rook is best placed on its first rank.
- When a rook is battling against pawns, if the pawns are not connected, it is often best for the rook to hold the pawns up along a rank.

=== Short vs. Yusupov ===
Short vs. Yusupov, 1984

Position: g8 black rook, h6 white king, e4 black king, h4 white pawn, c3 white pawn, f3 white rook

White to move, an exception to the Tarrasch rule

This position from Nigel Short and Artur Yusupov in 1984 is an exception to the rule, since White's king is stuck in front of the pawn. White played 1. Rh3 (rook behind passed pawn), Black replied 1... Kf5 and a draw resulted a few moves later. The move 1. Rf7 by White leads to a win.

=== Kharlov vs. Morozevich ===
Kharlov vs. Morozevich, 1995

Position: e7 black rook, f7 black pawn, g7 black king, g6 black pawn, h6 black pawn, b5 black pawn, b4 white rook, g3 white pawn, f2 white pawn, h2 white pawn, f1 white king

Black to move, exception to the Tarrasch rule

The position from a 1995 game between Andrei Kharlov and Alexander Morozevich is one in which the Tarrasch rule does not apply (for Black). The move 1...Rb7 would be in accordance with the Tarrasch rule, but 1... Re5 is the correct method because White's king is cut off from the pawn, White will have to spend a lot of time activating his rook, and by that time the black king will be able to get over to the queenside. The rule still applies for White, however, and the game continued:

2. Rd4 Kf6 3. Rd8 Ke7 4. Rb8 Kd7 5. Rb7+ Kc6 6. Rxf7 b4 7. Rf6+ Kb5 8. Rxg6 b3 9. Rg8 Re6 10. Rb8+ Rb6 11. Rd8 b2 12. Rd1 Rc6 0–1

After 13.Kg2 Rc1 14.Rd8 b1=Q 15.Rb8+ Kc6 16.Rxb1 Rxb1 Black's king is close enough to the kingside pawns to stop them.

=== Kramnik vs. Beliavsky ===
Kramnik vs. Beliavsky, 1993

Position: f5 black pawn, g5 black king, g4 black rook, h4 black pawn, a3 white pawn, f3 white king, b1 white rook

1. Ra1 loses, 1. Rb8 draws

The 1993 game between Vladimir Kramnik and Alexander Beliavsky has an unusual position in which following the Tarrasch Rule is incorrect. White played 1. Ra1 and lost. 1.Rb8, abandoning the pawn so the rook can attack from behind, draws. The endgame with rooks and f- and h-pawns was analyzed to be a draw by Mikhail Botvinnik in the 1940s (with correct defense).

=== Yusupov vs. Timman ===
Yusupov vs. Timman, 1992

Position: a8 black rook, e6 black pawn, f6 black king, g6 black pawn, h5 black pawn, a4 white pawn, f4 white pawn, h4 white pawn, g3 white pawn, f2 white king, e1 white rook

White to move: 35.Re4 wins but 35.Ra1 draws.

In this 1992 game between Artur Yusupov and Jan Timman, 35.Re4! wins but 35. Ra1? in the actual game only draws. The game was drawn twenty moves later.

== See also ==
- Chess endgame
- Chess strategy
- Rook and pawn versus rook endgame
