= Lucena position =

Position in rook and pawn versus rook chess endgame

Position: b8 white king, d8 black king, b7 white pawn, a2 black rook, c1 white rook

Lucena position: White wins with optimal play, regardless of who has the next move.

The Lucena position is a position in chess endgame theory where one side has a rook and a pawn and the defender has a rook. Karsten Müller said that it may be the most important position in endgame theory. It is fundamental in the rook and pawn versus rook endgame. If the side with the pawn can reach this type of position, they can forcibly win the game. Most rook and pawn versus rook endgames reach either the Lucena position (with the king of the stronger side in front of the pawn) or the Philidor position (with the defending king in front of the pawn) if played accurately. The side with the pawn will try to reach the Lucena position to win; the other side will try to reach the Philidor position to draw.

Endgames with rooks and any number of pawns, which occur in 8–10% of all games, may simplify to the Lucena position. As it is a known win, the player with the pawn will often try to reach the Lucena position, while their opponent will try to prevent it. There is an alternate method for winning this type of position that works only for pawns on the c-file through the f-file (see Rook and pawn versus rook endgame § Simple method for bishop pawns and central pawns).

== Introduction ==
The Lucena position is incorrectly named after the Castilian Luis Ramírez de Lucena: the position does not appear in his book on chess, Repetición de Amores e Arte de Axedrez (1497). The earliest preserved discussion of the position is in Alessandro Salvio's Il Puttino (1634), a romance on the career of the chess player Leonardo da Cutro, and it is in that form that it is given here. Salvio attributes it to Scipione Genovino. It is likely that the error arose from the sixth edition of the Handbuch des Schachspiels (1880), in which editor Constantin Schwede incorrectly attributed the position to "Lucena 96", possibly as a result of confusion over the references in Antonius van der Linde's 1874 work Das Schachspiel des XVI. Jahrhunderts.

The position is shown above and below (the position can be moved as a whole or mirrored so that the pawn is on any of the files b through g). White's aim is to either promote his pawn or else compel Black to give up his rook for it – either result will leave White with an overwhelming material advantage and a straightforward win. White has managed to advance his pawn to the seventh rank, but it is prevented from queening because his own king is in the way. White would like to move his king and then promote his pawn, but is prevented from moving to the a-file by the black rook, and prevented from moving to the c-file by the black king.

The essential characteristics of the position are:

- the pawn is any pawn except a rook pawn
- the pawn has advanced to the seventh rank
- the attacking king (the one with the pawn) is on the queening square of its pawn
- the attacking rook cuts off the opposing king from the pawn by at least one file
- the defending rook is on the file on the other side of the pawn

A straightforward approach by White (in the position above) such as

1. Rd1+ Ke7
2. Kc7

gets nowhere. Black can simply harass the white king with checks, and White makes no progress:

2... Rc2+
3. Kb6 Rb2+
4. Ka7 Ra2+
5. Kb8

== The winning method: building a bridge ==
The Lucena position

Position: b8 white king, d8 black king, b7 white pawn, a2 black rook, c1 white rook

White wins (mate in 21)

Position: b7 white pawn, e7 black king, b5 white king, b4 white rook, b1 black rook

Position after 7.Rb4! Black cannot prevent the pawn from promoting.

In the Lucena position, the side with the pawn has a winning method that always works for any pawn except a rook pawn (i.e. on the a- or h-file). In some circumstances, it also works for a rook pawn.

In the Lucena position, White can win with

1. Rd1+ Ke7
2. Rd4!

Now, if Black plays a waiting move, such as

2... Ra1

hoping to harass the white king with checks again as in the above variation, White continues

3. Kc7 Rc1+
4. Kb6 Rb1+
5. Kc6 Rc1+

Or 5.Ka6 Ra1+.

6. Kb5 Rb1+
7. Rb4!

The black rook can no longer check the white king without exchanging rooks, and Black cannot prevent the pawn from queening. Aron Nimzowitsch described this way for White to shield their king and pawn with their rook as "building a bridge".

It is important that the white rook go initially to the fourth rank if Black uses his most active defense: repeatedly checking the white king. If Black abandons this defense, the white rook can build a bridge on the fifth rank. In the line above, after

5. Kc6

if Black moves

5... Ke6

there is a trap for White: if 6.Rd5?? (to build a bridge on the fifth rank) then 6...Rxb7! draws. However, if

6. Rd6+

6.Re4+ followed by either 7.Re8 or (if 7...Kf7) 8.Re5 works as well.

6... Ke7
7. Rd5!

and White can build a bridge on the fifth rank by getting the rook to b5, the king to b6, and then the pawn can promote (position reflected):

7... Rc1+
8. Kb6 Rb1+
9. Rb5

and White wins.

If the defending rook is on the rank that would prevent moving the rook to the crucial rank (i.e. 2.Rd4), the win is straightforward (see Rook and pawn versus rook endgame § Defending rook prevents the bridge).

=== Black to move ===
from Emms

Position: b7 white pawn, e7 black king, a6 white king, d5 white rook, b2 black rook

Position after 6.Rd5

If Black is to move in the diagrammed position, he can prevent the white rook from going to the fourth rank, but then White still wins:

1... Ra4
2. Rd1+ Ke7
3. Kc7 Rc4+
4. Kb6 Rb4+
5. Ka6 Rb2

The black rook is not sufficiently far away to keep checking: if 5...Ra4+ then 6.Kb5 wins. Now White wins by blocking the checks with

6. Rd5

followed by

7. Rb5

=== Bridge on the fifth rank ===
from de la Villa

Position: d8 white king, d7 white pawn, g7 black king, c2 black rook, f1 white rook

White to move makes a bridge on the fifth rank instead of the fourth rank.

A bridge can also be built on the fifth rank (but it is better to build one on the fourth rank). The main line goes:

1. Rf5

Instead of 1.Rf4!

1... Rc1
2. Ke7

Threatening to promote the pawn, Black can just delay it with checks.

2... Re1+
3. Kd6 Rd1+
4. Rd5

and the pawn will promote. Or

1... Kg6
2. Ke7?!

Better is 2.Rf8 Kg7 3.Rf4!, back to a bridge on the fourth rank.

2... Kxf5!
3. d8=Q

and White has a winning (but difficult) queen versus rook endgame.

== Alternate plan for the defense ==
Alternative approaches are no better for Black. After 1.Rd1+ Ke7 2.Rd4 above, after

2... Rb2

for example, White can still carry out his plan as above, or he can win with the simple

3. Ra4 Kd7
4. Ka8 (or 4.Ka7) Kc7
5. Rc4+

which chases the black king away and allows the pawn to promote. (Or, 5.b8=Q+ Rxb8 6.Rc4+ wins the rook.)

== Rook pawn ==
Silman diagram 223

Position: a8 white king, a7 white pawn, f7 black king, b2 black rook, e1 white rook

White wins

The Lucena method also works with a rook pawn if the white rook is already on the fourth rank, the black rook is not on the file adjacent to the pawn, and White is to move. Otherwise, the defending king must be cut off four files from the pawn, as in the diagram. This is not a true Lucena position since the king is cut off by more than one file. White wins:

1. Rc1 Ke7
2. Rc8 Kd6!
3. Rb8 Ra2
4. Kb7 Rb2+
5. Kc8 Rc2+
6. Kd8 Rh2!
7. Rb6+ Kc5
8. Rc6+! Kxc6
9. a8=Q+

and White has a won queen versus rook endgame – one that is easier to win than one where the rook is close to its king.

== Some exceptions ==
de la Villa, position 10.4

Position: e8 white king, e7 white pawn, g7 black king, a2 black rook, f1 white rook

Black to move draws

Not all similar positions are wins. In this position, Black draws because he can safely check from the side. For this defense to work, there must be at least three files between the defending rook and the attacking king, and the defending king must be positioned such that it does not block the checks; that is, the defending king is on the "short side" of the pawn (the one with fewer files between the pawn and the edge of the board). (See Rook and pawn versus rook endgame § "Short-side" defense for more details.)

== Examples from praxis ==
Rice versus Snape

Rice vs. Snape, 2000

Position: f7 black rook, g6 white rook, e2 white king, g2 black pawn, g1 black king

Black to move wins using the Lucena position

In this 2000 game between Rice and Ian Snape, Black uses the above procedure:

81... Re7+
82. Kd2 Re5!
83. Rg8 Kf2
84. Rf8+ Kg3
85. Rg8+ Kf3

Here White deviates from the above:

86. Kd1 Re4

White resigns, but the alternative is:

86. Rf8+ Kg4
87. Rg8+ Rg5

and Black wins.

Andersson versus Åkesson

Andersson vs. Åkesson, 1999

Position: d6 black king, f6 white king, d5 black pawn, e5 white rook, f5 white pawn, e3 white pawn, f1 black rook

White to move wins

In this position from a 1999 game between Ulf Andersson and Ralf Åkesson, White exchanges pawns in order to get to the Lucena position.

79. e4! dxe4
80. Rxe4 Kd7
81. Kg6

and Black resigned. White will reach a Lucena position: 81...Rg1+ 82.Kf7 Rf1 83.f6 Rf2 84.Kg7 Rg2+ 85.Kf8 Rf2 86.f7 Rg2 (a Lucena position) 87.Rd4+ Kc7 (if 87...Ke6 then 88.Ke8 wins) 88.Ke7 Re2+ 89. Kf6 Rf2+ 90.Ke6 Re2+ 91.Kf5 Rf2+ 92.Rf4 and White wins.

== See also ==
- Chess endgame
- Philidor position
- Rook and pawn versus rook endgame
