= Rook and pawn versus rook endgame =

Chess endgame theory

Position: c4 white rook, e4 black king, c3 white king, b2 white pawn, d1 black rook

Black to move, White promotes the pawn in 60 moves.

The rook and pawn versus rook endgame is a fundamentally important, widely studied chess endgame. Precise play is usually required in these positions. With optimal play, some complicated wins require sixty moves to either checkmate, capture the defending rook, or successfully promote the pawn. In some cases, thirty-five moves are required to advance the pawn once.

The play of this type of ending revolves around whether or not the pawn can be promoted, or if the defending rook must be sacrificed to prevent promotion. If the pawn promotes, that side will have an overwhelming material advantage. If the pawn is about to promote, the defending side may give up their rook for the pawn, resulting in an easily won endgame for the superior side (a basic checkmate). In a few cases, the superior side gives up their rook in order to promote the pawn, resulting in a winning queen versus rook position (see Pawnless chess endgame § Queen versus rook).

A rule of thumb (with exceptions) is: if the king on the side without the pawn can reach the queening square of the pawn, the game is a draw; otherwise it is a win for the opponent (except with a rook pawn, i.e. a- or h-file). The side with the pawn can cut off the opposing king or strive for the Lucena position, which is a win. The defender can aim for the Philidor position (which is a draw) or try to set up one of the other defensive techniques that draw. A rook and two pawns usually win against a rook, but there are plenty of exceptions.

== Importance ==
Endings with rooks and any number of pawns are the most common type to occur in games, occurring in about 8 to 10 percent of all games. A majority of rook and pawn endings with more pawns have the potential of being reduced to this type of endgame (rook and one pawn versus rook). John Nunn wrote a 352-page book about this ending, Secrets of Rook Endings. Volume 2 of the Encyclopedia of Chess Endings devotes 92 pages to the analysis of 428 positions of this type. André Chéron wrote over 150 pages analyzing 120 positions of this endgame in their famous book Lehr- und Handbuch der Endspiele. In 100 Endgames You Must Know by Jesús de la Villa, 17 are of this type. Nunn covers 100 topics in Understanding Chess Endgames – eight are about this type of endgame.

This table summarizes results from games compiled from several game databases, where this position was reached. "Max DTC" is the maximum number of moves in depth to conversion, either a checkmate or conversion to a winning endgame via promotion of the pawn or capture of the opposing rook.

Games with rook and pawn versus rook
Pawn	Max DTC	Percentage	Winning %
a/h	51	26%	34%
b/g	60	31%	48%
c/f	57	29%	44%
d/e	59	15%	43%

== Terminology ==
- In the following discussion and positions, assume that the side with the pawn is White. White will be attempting to win and Black will be attempting to draw.
- Ranks are counted from that player's side of the board. Thus, "the rook's third rank" would be the third rank counting from that player's side of the board. The ranks for the white pieces correspond to the ranks in algebraic notation, whereas the ranks for the black pieces are reversed.
- In these positions with one pawn, the pawn's file divides the board into a short side and a long side, in which the long side consists of more files than the short side.
- A pawn is referred to by the file on which it stands: a rook pawn is on the a- or h-file, a knight pawn is on the b- or g-file, a bishop pawn is on the c- or f-file. A central pawn is a queen pawn or a king pawn, on the d- or e-file.
- When designating a position as a win or a draw, optimal play by both sides is assumed.

== Pawn on the sixth or seventh rank ==
In his 1958 book Chess Endgames, Nikolay Kopaev gave these general guidelines for when the pawn is on the sixth or seventh rank:

- When the black king is cut off two or more files from the pawn, White always wins.
- If the black king is on the long side of the pawn and their rook is on the short side, White wins with very few exceptions. (The long side is the side with more files to the side of the board – the short side is the side with fewer files).
- If the pawn is on the seventh rank, the only defense involves checks from the side. If the pawn is on the sixth rank, a defense of checks from the rear is possible.
- The defense of checking from the side normally requires three empty files between the pawn and the black rook. Sometimes it is possible with only two files when the pawn is on the seventh rank.
- In order for a defense of checking from behind to be successful, the white king must be behind the pawn, not in front of it.
- There are tactical possibilities: (1) deflecting the black rook, and (2) creating a shelter for the white king.

== Winning methods ==
In order to force a win with the extra pawn, normally the black king must be cut off from the pawn by the white rook along a rank or file, and that is not always sufficient.

=== Black king is cut off along a rank ===
Cutting off the king

Position: e8 black rook, d5 white pawn, e5 white king, h4 white rook, e3 black king

The black king is cut off along a rank, so White wins easily.

If the black king is cut off from the pawn along a rank (as in the diagram), White wins easily if the king is behind the pawn:

1. Kd6 Rd8+
2. Ke6 Re8+
3. Kd7 Rg8

Checks from the front or side do not help Black.

4. d6 Rg7+
5. Kc8 Rg8+
6. Kc7 Rg7+
7. d7

and the pawn will soon promote.

When cutting the defending king off by a rank, a perfect cut is when the pawn is on the same rank as the defending king. An imperfect cut is when the king is on the rank ahead of the pawn. These general rules apply:

1. The defending king should be cut off on a rank on the long side of the pawn. Otherwise, the position is not dangerous for the defense if the defending rook is on the long side.
2. With a perfect cut, the position is always won with a bishop pawn or knight pawn on any rank. A central pawn wins if it is on the fourth rank or beyond.
3. With an imperfect cut, the position is a draw if the defending rook is on the file adjacent to the pawn. In addition, the defense has more possibilities against a central pawn.
de la Villa, position 10.17

Position: b8 black rook, c5 white rook, b4 white pawn, d4 black king, b3 white king

White has a perfect cut of the king along a rank.

In this position, White has a perfect cut and wins:

1... Ra8
2. Rc6 Rb8
3. Ra6 Kd5
4. Ka4! Kc4
5. Rc6+! Kd5
6. b5 Ra8+
7. Kb4

This is the same position but advanced one rank. Now the process is repeated:

7... Rb8
8. Rc7 Kd6
9. Ra7 Kd5
10. Ka5 Kc5
11. Rc7+ Kd6
12. b6 Ra8+
13. Kb5 Ra1

White threatened Rh7, b7, and Kb6 so Black tries checks from the rear. However, play will soon lead to a Lucena position (see below), which easily wins for White.

=== Black king is cut off from the pawn's file ===
When the black king is cut off from the pawn's file the outcome depends on where the black king is in relation to the pawn. Black's king is often cut off from the pawn along a file. Some general rules (with exceptions) are:

- If the pawn is a rook pawn, the position is usually a draw.
- If the pawn is on the fifth rank (or sixth or seventh rank) with its king near, and the black king is cut off from the pawn's file on the long side, without the black rook being able to immediately challenge its white counterpart (see 1...Rf8 drawing method in section Frontal defense under Defensive methods), White has a won position. If the black king is cut off on the short side, Black may be able to draw by delivering checks from the long side (see "Short-side" defense under Defensive methods).
- If the pawn is on the third or fourth rank, (a) if it is a bishop pawn or central pawn, White always wins if the black king is cut off by two files for a fourth rank pawn and three files for a third rank pawn (see "The Rule Of Five" below) (i.e. White's rook is two files over from their pawn and the black king is on the other side), and (b) if the pawn is a knight pawn, White always wins if the black king is cut off by three files.
- If the pawn is on the second rank and the black king is on the fourth or fifth rank, White wins only if the opposing king is cut off five files from the pawn.
- In some cases White wins even if the black king is closer.

==== Rule of five ====
The rule of five

Position: d8 black rook, g5 black king, d4 white pawn, d3 white king, f1 white rook

White to move. The pawn is on the fourth rank, the king is cut off by two files, White wins.

The rule of five is for positions in which the pawn is protected and the opposing king is cut off by files: Add the number of rank of the pawn to the number of files the defender's king is cut off. If the sum is more than five, it is usually a win. Otherwise it is normally a draw. For example, in the diagram, white wins by:

1. Kc4 Rc8+
2. Kb5

The white king must have this file available.

2... Rd8
3. Kc5 Rc8+
4. Kb6! Rd8
5. Rd1! Kf6
6. Kc7 Ra8
7. d5

and White will win.

Chéron, 1923

Position: b8 black rook, e6 black king, b4 white pawn, b3 white king, d1 white rook

The rule of five seems to apply, but Black draws because the pawn is a knight pawn, so the white king does not have room to maneuver.

The position by Chéron is basically the same, except moved over two files. Now the white king has less room to maneuver on the left of the pawn's file, and Black can prevent the advance of the pawn and draw. If White starts with 1. Ka4, the rook checks the king, and the king is forced back to b3. White can try:

1. Rd4 Ke5
2. Kc3 Rc8+
3. Rc4 Rb8
4. Rc6 Kd5
5. Ra6 Rc8+
6. Kb3 Rc6!
7. Ra8 Kd6

Or 7.Ra7 Rc1, and the black king reaches the pawn's file, for a draw. Another try for White is:

1. Rd2 Ke5
2. Rd7 Ke6
3. Rc7 Kd6
4. Rc5 Kd7
5. Ka4 Ra8+
6. Ra5 Rb8
7. Ra7+ Kc6
8. Ka5 Rb5+
9. Ka4 Rb8

and the position is drawn. If the pieces are moved one file to the right, White has a win.

Capablanca

Position: c5 black king, e3 white king, d2 white rook, f2 white pawn, h2 black rook

White wins because Black's rook is not in position for frontal checks.

In the discussion above about the defending king being cut off by files, it is assumed that the defending rook is already in position to check the attacking king along files (usually from its first rank). In this position by José Capablanca, White wins because the white pawn can reach its fourth rank before the black rook can check along files. If the black rook were already at h8 and it were Black's move, Black would draw by checking the king and by playing ...Rf8 when the white king moves to f1. With White to move in the diagrammed position:

1. Rd1 Rh8
2. f4 Re8+
3. Kf3 Rf8
4. Kg4 Rg8+
5. Kh5 Rh8+
6. Kg6 etc.,

and White will win. With Black to move,

1... Kc6
2. Rd8 Rh7
3. f3

3.f4 draws after 3...Rd7 or 3...Kc7.

3... Re7+
4. Kf2 Rf7
5. Kg3 etc.,

and White wins.

==== Simple method for bishop pawns and central pawns ====
Position: e8 white king, c7 black king, e7 white pawn, d2 white rook, f1 black rook

White wins, using a method for bishop pawns and central pawns.

There is a simple way of winning if the pawn is a bishop pawn or central pawn (i.e. on the c-, d-, e-, or f-file) and its king can reach the promotion square of the pawn.

In the diagram, 1. Rc2+ would start the process of winning as in the Lucena position (below). However, White also wins more easily by:

1. Rh2 Rf3
2. Rh8 Rf1
3. Rf8 Re1
4. Kf7

Now either

4... Kd7
5. e8=Q+

and White wins easily, or the white king can approach the black rook on the two files next to the pawn's file until it can no longer check:

4... Rf1+
5. Kg6 Rg1+
6. Kf5 Rf1+
7. Kg4 Rg1+
8. Kf3 Rf1+
9. Ke2

and the black rook can no longer attack, and the pawn promotes.

This method does not work for rook pawns (e.g. a- and h-files) or knight pawns (e.g. b- and g-files), because the white king does not have room to maneuver. However, the Lucena position (below) is a win for White if the pawn is not a rook pawn.

==== Lucena position ====
The Lucena position

Position: b8 white king, d8 black king, b7 white pawn, a2 black rook, c1 white rook

White wins.

The Lucena position is one of the most famous and important positions in chess endgame theory. It is a win for the side with the pawn. The essential characteristics are that White's king is on the queening square in front of their pawn, the pawn is on the b- through g-files, the black rook cuts off White's king from escaping away from the black king, and the Black king is cut off on a file.

White wins in the position in the diagram by

1. Rd1+

forcing the black king one file farther away, then bringing their rook to the fourth rank to make a "bridge" to protect the king, then bringing out the king, which will be checked by Black's rook. White maneuvers their king to the fifth rank (without giving up the pawn) and then when the black rook checks, White interposes their rook and has a winning position. See Lucena position for more details.

==== Defending rook prevents the bridge ====
Position: c8 black king, e8 white king, e7 white pawn, f4 black rook, d1 white rook

White to move

If the defending rook is on the superior side's fourth rank, it prevents the rook from making a bridge on that rank. In that case, the win is straightforward.

1. Rc1+ Kb7
2. Kd7!

The black rook is not far enough away from the white king to keep safely checking.

2... Rd4+
3. Ke6 Re4+
4. Kd6 Kb6

Other fourth moves by Black are no better. If 4...Rd4+ then 5.Ke5 wins, as the rook cannot stop the pawn. If Black tries a different move, say 4...Re2 then White moves 5.Rc5 and builds a bridge on the fifth rank.

5. Rd1 Kb5
6. Rd5+ Kb6
7. Re5

and Black cannot stop the pawn.

=== Other methods ===
Horwitz and Kling, 1851

Position: e8 white king, c7 black king, e7 white pawn, d2 white rook, e1 black rook

White to move wins.

It may not be necessary to build a bridge (as in the Lucena position) to win, if the king is on its pawn's promotion square. White wins in this position:

1. Rc2+ Kb7

Or 1...Kd6 2.Kd8 Rxe7 3.Rd2+ Ke6 4.Re2+ wins the rook.

2. Rf2 Rh1
3. Kf7 Rh7+
4. Ke6 Rh8
5. Kd7 Rh7
6. Kd8 wins.

== Defensive methods ==
Often White will not be able to utilize one of the winning methods. Black has several defensive methods available, depending mainly on the position of the pawn and their king.

If the defending king is in front of the pawn and the attacking king and pawn have not yet reached their sixth rank, the Philidor position (or Philidor defense) easily works to secure a draw. If the defending king cannot get in front of the pawn but is not cut off, the short-side defense can be used. If the pawn is a rook pawn or knight pawn, the back-rank defense can be used. The back-rank defense can also be used when the pawn is on other files if the attacking king has not reached the sixth rank. If the king is cut off along a file, the frontal defense may work, depending on the file of the pawn and how far advanced it is.

=== Philidor position ===
Philidor's position, or third-rank defense

Position: e8 black king, h7 white rook, b6 black rook, f5 white king, e4 white pawn

Black is defending the Philidor position, and draws, even if White is to move.

Philidor's position (see the diagram) illustrates an important drawing technique in this endgame. The technique is also known as the third-rank defense and works when the defending king is in front of the pawn and the attacking king and pawn have not reached their sixth rank. Black keeps their rook on their third rank to keep the white king from reaching that rank. If White advances the pawn to its sixth rank (Black's third rank), then the king is deprived of shelter, so Black moves their rook to the eighth (or seventh) rank, and keeps checking the white king from behind. It is very important that the defender keep their rook on their third rank, and move to the far side of the board only after the attacking pawn has moved to its sixth rank. (An exchange of rooks will result in a drawn position, see king and pawn versus king endgame.) See Philidor position for more details.

There are three errors that Black must avoid:

1. Immobilizing the rook
2. Allowing the king to be driven away from the queening square
3. Playing the king to the wrong side

Philidor's defense can also be used with the black rook on the fourth rank, if White's king and pawn have not reached that rank. If this defense is used, the black king should be on the second rank. The principle is the same: Black keeps their rook on the fourth rank, keeping the white king from advancing to that rank. If the pawn advances to that rank, Black moves the rook to the eighth rank and checks the king from behind.

=== Back-rank defense ===
Back-rank defense

Position: b8 black rook, g8 black king, a7 white rook, f6 white king, g6 white pawn

Black draws using the back-rank defense.

The back-rank defense always works if the pawn is a rook pawn or knight pawn and the defending king is in front of the pawn. The defending king blocks the pawn and the rook is on the first rank preventing checks by the rook. In the diagram, Black draws. If 1.g7 then 1...Rb6+ draws, and if 1.Rg7+ then 1...Kh8 draws. White's best attempt is:

1. Kg5 Rc8

Waiting passively, also known as the passive defense.

2. Kh6 Rb8
3. Rg7+

The only trick for White.

3... Kh8!

If 3...Kf8? then 4.Kh7 Rb1 5.Rf7+ Ke8 6.Rf4 and White gets to the Lucena position.

4. Rh7+ Kg8
5. Ra7 Rc8

and White makes no progress. The defense fails for other pawns (if the attacking king has reached the sixth rank) because White has another file available to go around the pawn.

Averbakh and Kopaev

Position: b8 black rook, f8 black king, a7 white rook, f6 white pawn, g5 white king

White to move wins. Black to move draws.

If the attacking king has not reached the sixth rank, the defense works for any pawn. In the second diagram, White to move wins by getting their king to the sixth rank so the defending rook can not leave the back rank because of the threat of checkmate. This illustrates how the defense fails for a bishop pawn or central pawn:

1. Kg6 Rd8
2. Rh7 Kg8
3. f7+ Kf8
4. Rh8+ Ke7
5. Rxd8 and wins.

If Black is to move in the diagrammed position, they draw with

1... Rb1!

which neutralizes the threat of Kg6, because Black can check from behind and there is no immediate threat of checkmate by White. Black checks from behind, as in the Philidor defense.

If neither the pawn or king have reached the sixth rank, Black can normally draw by reaching the Philidor position, above.

=== King in front of pawn, but cannot reach the Philidor position ===
Sometimes, the defender's king is in front of the pawn, but the rook cannot get to its third rank to reach the Philidor position. Thus, they have two choices: try to attack from behind, or retreat to the back rank with their rook to guard the mating threats. The diagrams show such back-rank positions. For a bishop pawn (see first diagram) or central pawn, if the defending rook is tied down to the back rank, the defender loses:

Position: a8 black rook, g8 black king, b7 white rook, f6 white pawn, g6 white king

Black cannot reach the Philidor position, and loses.

Position: a8 black rook, g8 black king, b7 white rook, g6 white pawn, h6 white king

Similar position with knight's pawn, but Black draws.

1. Rg7+ Kf8 (or Kh8)
2. Rh7! Kg8
3. f7+ Kf8
4. Rh8+

winning the rook. But the defender can hold the draw with an accurately conducted "active defense" from behind the pawn while it is still on the fifth rank, with the king moving to the short side (see next section).

With a knight pawn (see second diagram), however, the attacker has no file equivalent to 2.Rh7, so they cannot make progress. Here, the defender should avoid the active defense (attacking the pawn from behind while it is on the fifth with the rook). It fails because their king will be forced to the long side (stepping the other way would lose immediately because of the corner, allowing immediate mate).

The defender can draw against the rook pawn either way, because most king and pawn versus king positions are drawn with the rook pawn (see King and pawn versus king endgame § Rook pawn).

=== "Short-side" defense ===
Not all positions similar to the Lucena position above are wins for the superior side – it depends on the position of Black's rook and king (relative to White's pawn), and which side is to move. In positions such as the position in this diagram, the defending rook must be at least four files away from the pawn on the "long side" for the defense to work (the "checking distance"); otherwise the white king can support its pawn and approach the black rook to drive it away. The black king needs to be on the "short side" so it will not block checks by its own rook.

The short-side defense
Siegbert Tarrasch, 1906

Position: e8 white king, e7 white pawn, g7 black king, a2 black rook, f1 white rook

Black to play draws. White to move wins.

As an example, Black to move draws in this diagram. The reason is that Black can check the white king from the side with their rook, and the rook is just far enough away from the white king that if it tries to approach the rook to stop the checks, the rook can get behind the pawn and win it, resulting in a drawn position. For example:

1... Ra8+
2. Kd7 Ra7+
3. Kd6 Ra6+
4. Kd5 Ra5+
5. Kc6 Ra6+

If 5...Ra8 6.Ra1! (Either Black takes the rook and the white pawn queens, or it forces the enemy rook off the vital a-file that has "checking distance", the rook moves on the back rank, followed by 7.Kd7, and the pawn promotes.)

6. Kb7 Re6

with a draw after winning the pawn, which can no longer be defended by its king.

Tarrasch, 1906

Position: d8 white king, d7 white pawn, f7 black king, a2 black rook, e1 white rook

White wins.

If White's king and pawn are moved to the left, White wins as in the Lucena position above. With a few exceptions, the defending rook must be at least four files over from the pawn for this defense to work (which is why the defending king should go to the short side, to not block checks by their rook).

1... Ra8+

1...Rc2 leads to a Lucena position.

2. Kc7 Ra7+
3. Kc8 Ra8+
4. Kb7 Rd8
5. Kc7!

and White wins. The rook was too close to the pawn, so White's king could both approach the rook to prevent checks and return to protect the pawn.

==== Short-side defense, less-advanced pawn ====
1. Kg6

This threatens 2.Ra8+ Ke7 3.f6+ driving the black king far from the pawn. (See the Lucena Position next section for White's winning method.) 1...Rb6+ is too late because of 2.f6, forcing Black to retreat to the back rank, which is a loss as shown in the previous section. The point of Philidor's third rank defense is to prevent White from moving the king to the sixth rank before the pawn.

Short-side defense, less-advanced pawn

Position: f8 black king, a7 white rook, f5 white pawn, g5 white king, b1 black rook

Black to move should play 1...Rb6 with an easy Philidor draw. But White to play can prevent that, and Black must be careful.

Position: f8 black king, a7 white rook, f6 white king, f5 white pawn, f1 black rook

Position after 2.Kf6. Black is at a crossroads: they must move their king to the side to avoid mate, but which square?

Black's defense is:

1... Rf1

Tarrasch rule, rook behind pawn.

2. Kf6 (second diagram)

2.Ra8+ Ke7 and now the black rook stops 3.f6+.

2... Kg8!

Going to the short side is vital, as will become clear.

3. Ra8+ Kh7
4. Rf8

Other moves make no progress because of Black obeying the Tarrasch rule. E.g. 4.Ke6 Kg7 and 5.f6+ is impossible. The main move protects the pawn and threatens 5.Ke7 followed by f6.

4...Ra1!

Now Black threatens to check from the side to keep White from making any progress. Black needs space to do this, which is why the king must move out of the way to the short side. There must be at least three files between Black's rook and the pawn, otherwise White's king can protect White's pawn while attacking Black's rook and gain time necessary to advance the pawn.

5. Re8

One try, to use the rook to block the checks from the side.

5... Rf1!

Black moves behind the pawn again, so 6.Ke6 is answered by 6...Kg7, as per note to move 4.

==== Long-side blunder ====
If the black king went to the long side, Black would not have the resource of checking from the side. For example, from the second diagram above, where 2...Kg8! draws as shown above:

2... Ke8?
3. Ra8+ Kd7
4. Rf8! Rh1
5. Kg7 Ke7

There is no room to check on the side. If 5...Rg1+ then 6.Kf7 followed by f6.

6. f6+

The point of 4.Rf8.

6... Kd7

6...Ke6 7.Re8+ Kd7 8.Re2 and converts to Lucena position, next section.

7. Kf7

followed by Ra8 then Ra2-d2+ (or any other safe check on the d-file). After this, and the same if Black prevents the check by placing their own rook on the d-file, White plays Kg7 Rg(any)+; Kf8 then f7, reaching the Lucena position.

If the pawn is a central pawn, going to the long side with the defending king will sometimes give the rook just enough checking distance if it is on the rook file on the opposite side of the pawn. Defending this way is a far more arduous task, so moving the defending king to the short side is always recommended. With the defending rook three files over from the pawn, the attacker usually wins, but there are exceptions, depending on the location of the attacking rook.

=== Last-rank defense ===
Last-rank defense

Position: b8 black rook, a7 white rook, d7 white king, e7 white pawn, f7 black king

Black draws.

In the diagram, Black draws:

1... Re8!
2. Kd6 Rb8!

If 2...Rg8 then 3.Ra1!. If 2...Kf6 then 3.Ra1! Rb8 4.Rf1+ Kg7 5.Kc6 Ra8 6.Ra1, a winning position.

3. Kd7 Re8

and White can not make any progress.

=== Frontal defense ===
Frontal defense

Position: b8 black rook, e7 black king, g4 white pawn, g3 white king, f2 white rook

If White is to move, Black draws using the frontal defense. Black to move has an alternate drawing defense.

The Frontal Defense is a way that Black may keep White from getting to the Lucena position, even if the defending king is cut off from the pawn's file. Black's rook is well-placed on its first rank and can check the white king or offer itself for exchange when the resulting king and pawn versus king endgame is a draw. The farther back the pawn is, the more likely the defense is to be successful. To have good drawing chances, there should be at least three ranks between the pawn and the defending rook (called the rule of three). The file of the pawn matters too: a bishop pawn gives the best winning chances, followed by a central pawn, followed by a knight pawn, with a rook pawn having little chance of winning.

If White is to move in the diagram, Black draws by using the frontal defense:

1. Kh4 Rh8+!
2. Kg5 Rg8+
3. Kh5 Rh8+
4. Kg6 Rg8+
5. Kh5 Rh8+

and White cannot make any progress.

If Black to move in this position, they have an alternative drawing method that requires knowledge of the king and pawn versus king endgame:

1... Rf8

To bring the king over to the pawn.

2. Rxf8 Kxf8
3. Kf4 Kg8!

Avoids losing the opposition. 3.Kh4 is met the same way.

4. Kf5 Kf7

or 4.Kg5 Kg7, and the position is a draw.

Emms

Position: b8 black rook, d7 black king, f4 white pawn, f3 white king, e2 white rook

White to move wins, Black to move draws. Draw if the black king is on d6.

The frontal defense may or may not work for bishop pawns and central pawns, even if there are three ranks between the pawn and the defending rook. In the diagram from Emms, White to move wins:

1. Kg4! Rg8+
2. Kh5 Rf8
3. Kg5 Rg8+
4. Kh6 Rf8
5. Re4! Kd6
6. Kg7 Rf5
7. Kg6 Rf8
8. f5

and White will reach the Lucena position.

Black to move in that position draws, by reaching a drawn king and pawn versus king endgame position:

1... Re8
2. Rxe8 Kxe8
3. Ke4 Kf8
4. Ke5 Ke7

Black to move in that position also draws with 1...Kd6, getting the king to a favorable position.

== Rook pawn ==
Endings with a rook pawn arise frequently because they are more likely to be the last remaining pawn. If the pawn is a rook pawn, the chances of a draw are much greater. Even the equivalent of the Lucena position is no guarantee of success (it depends on the location of the white rook and who is to move). These endings are more likely to be a draw because (1) the pawn can protect the king from checks from the rear only, and not from the side, and (2) the edge of the board reduces the king's mobility in trying to support the pawn.

With a rook pawn, usually in actual play the defending rook or king is able to get in front of the pawn. If the defending king gets in front of the pawn, the game is a draw. If the defending rook gets in front of the pawn, the result depends on which king arrives on the scene first.

The attacking king or rook may be in front of the pawn.

=== King in front of pawn ===
Position: a8 white king, a7 white pawn, e7 black king, d2 white rook, b1 black rook

White has a rook pawn. Black draws.

In this diagram, the only way for White to make progress is to get their rook to b8, but this allows the black king to get to the c-file and draw.

1. Rh2 Kd7
2. Rh8 Kc7!
3. Rb8 Rc1
4. Rb2 Rc3!

This is the simplest way for Black. Now there is no way to force the black king away from the c-file.

5. Rb7+ Kc8
6. Rg7 Rc1

and Black draws.

Position: a8 white king, a7 white pawn, f7 black king, e3 white rook, b1 black rook

Rook pawn, black king is cut off far away, White wins.

If the black king is cut off by four or more files, White wins, as in this diagram:

1. Rc3! Ke7
2. Rc8 Kd6
3. Rb8 Ra1
4. Kb7 Rb1+
5. Kc8 Rc1+
6. Kd8 Rh1
7. Rb6+ Kc5
8. Rc6+! Kd5
9. Ra6

and White wins.

=== Rook in front of pawn ===
from de la Villa, position 10.22

Position: a8 white rook, a7 white pawn, b7 black cross, c7 black cross, f7 black king, g7 black circle, h7 black circle, b6 black cross, c6 black cross, g2 white king, a1 black rook

Black would draw if the king gets to the indicated squares.

In this position, the black king needs to get to one of the marked squares in order to draw. If it gets to one of the squares marked with "x", the king can move next to the pawn and the rook can capture the pawn for a draw. Otherwise, the king needs to stay on the squares marked with dots: g7 and h7. The reason is that if the black king is on another rank, the white rook can check and then the pawn promotes and wins. For example, if the black king were on f6 instead, with White to move, 1.Rf8+ followed by 2.a8=Q wins. Also, the black king needs to be on g7 or h7 rather than d7, e7, or f7. If it were White's move in this position, White wins by 1.Rh8 Rxa7 (otherwise the pawn promotes and wins) 2.Rh7+, skewering the rook. If the black king is on g7 or h7 and the white king approaches the pawn (to protect it while the rook moves out of the way), the black rook will check from behind and the king has no cover from the checks.

==== Vančura position ====
Vančura position

Position: a8 white rook, g7 black king, a6 white pawn, f6 black rook, c4 white king

Black draws

The Vančura position (see diagram) is a drawing position with a rook and rook's pawn versus a rook, when the pawn is not beyond its sixth rank, and the stronger side's rook is in front of the pawn. It was studied by Josef Vančura (1898–1921), published in 1924. Black's rook keeps attacking the pawn from the side from some distance away, while preventing the white king from finding cover from checks. The black king must be on the opposite side of their rook as the pawn to not block the attacks. The black rook moves behind the pawn as soon as the pawn moves up to its seventh rank. Also, Black's king must be near the corner on the opposite side of the board if the pawn advances to its seventh rank so the white rook cannot check the black king and then support the advance of the pawn, or sacrifice its pawn to skewer Black's king and rook on the seventh rank, as in the section above.

1. Kb5

Protecting the pawn in order to free the rook to move. If 1.a7 Ra6! 2.Kb5 Ra1 3.Kb6 Rb1+ 4.Kc7 Rc1+ 5.Kd7 Ra1, and White cannot win. Note that if Black's king were on g6 there would follow 2.Rg8+ with 3.a8=Q, and if it were on f7 White would win with 2.Rh8! Rxa7 3.Rh7+.

1... Rf5+!
2. Kc6 Rf6+!

An important square for the rook. Black now checks on the f-file and aims to maintain a sideways attack on the pawn.

3. Kd5 Rf5+
4. Ke6 Rf6+
5. Ke5 Rb6

Maintaining sideways contact with the pawn.

6. Kd5 Rf6
7. Kd4 Rb6

But not 7...Rf4+? 8.Ke5! and White wins.

8. Kc5 Rf6
9. Ra7+

Or 9.a7 Ra6! with a draw.

9... Kg6
10. Ra8 Kg7

and White cannot win. The white king cannot advance because of the checks and the pawn cannot advance because the black rook gets behind the pawn.

P. Romanovsky, 1950

Position: a8 white rook, g7 black king, a6 white pawn, e6 white circle, f5 white circle, g5 white circle, h5 white circle, f4 white circle, g4 white circle, h4 white circle, e3 white circle, f3 white circle, g3 white circle, h3 white circle, d2 white circle, e2 white circle, f2 white circle, g2 white circle, h2 white circle, a1 black rook

If Black is to move, they can draw only if the white king is on a marked square.

In Shakhmaty v SSSR in 1950, Peter Romanovsky published a drawing zone (see diagram). If Black is to move and the white king is on one of the marked squares, Black draws by reaching the Vančura position. Otherwise White wins.

== Most common rook endgame ==
Cecil Purdy gives the most common type of rook endgame as one with a rook and rook pawn versus a rook, with the rook in front of its pawn.

Purdy's most common rook and pawn endgame

Position: a8 white rook, a7 white pawn, g7 black king, a1 black rook

With the white king anywhere, Black to move draws.

Position: a8 white rook, a7 white king, f7 black king, a6 white pawn, b1 black rook

White wins with either side to move.

Position: g8 black king, a7 white rook, a6 white pawn, f6 black rook

With the white king anywhere, Black to move draws. This is an exception to the Tarrasch rule.

In the second diagram, White wins easily. If it is Black's move:

1... Ke7
2. Rb8 R-any
3. Kb7 Rb1+
4. Ka8! R-any
5. a7

and White wins. They can force their king out by Kb7 or if the black rook prevents that by going to the seventh rank, then Rh8 and Kb8.

Purdy, page 118

Position: h8 black king, a7 white rook, a6 white pawn, f2 white king, a1 black rook

White to move wins, Black to move draws

In this diagram, White to move wins, starting with 1.Ke2. Black to move draws.

== Examples from master games ==
The positions discussed above are somewhat idealized, but they are fundamental to practical play. Here are some examples of this endgame from master games.

=== Larsen vs. Browne, 1982 ===
Larsen vs. Browne, 1982

Position: b7 black rook, h6 white rook, d4 black king, g4 white king, g3 white pawn

Position after 65.Rxh6

Position: g8 white king, e7 black king, g7 white pawn, h2 black rook, f1 white rook

Position after 80.Kg8

The game Bent Larsen–Walter Browne, Las Palmas 1982, illustrates an alternate winning method with a knight pawn. A variation of moves would have resulted in the "building a bridge" method.

65... Rg7+ 66. Kf4 Rf7+ 67. Kg5 Ke5 68. g4 Rf8 69. Kh5 Rf7 70. g5 Kf5 71. Rh8 Ke6 72. Re8+ Kf5 73. g6 Ra7 74. Rf8+ Ke6 75. Rf1 Ra2 76. Kh6 Ke7 77. g7 Rh2+ 78. Kg6 Rg2+ 79. Kh7 Rh2+ 80. Kg8 (second diagram) Ra2

Or if 80...Rh3, then 81.Re1+ Kd7 82.Re4 Rh2 83.Kf7 Rf2+ 84.Kg6 Rg2+ 85.Kf6 Rf2+ 86.Kg5 Rg2+ 87.Rg4 and White will win by building a bridge.

81. Rh1 1–0

=== Pein vs. Ward, 1997 ===
Malcolm Pein vs. Chris Ward
British Championship, 1997

Position: d6 black king, a5 white rook, c4 black pawn, f4 white king, c2 black rook

Black to move wins.

60... Re2! (cutting the white king off) 61. Kf3 Re7 62. Kf2 Kc6 63. Kf3 Kb6 64. Rd5 c3 65. Rh5 c2 66. Rh1 Rc7 67. Rc1 Kb5 68. Ke2 Kb4 69. Kd2 Kb3 70. Rh1 Kb2! 0–1

=== Ward vs. Arkell, 1994 ===
Ward vs. Arkell
British Championship, 1994

Position: g8 black king, a7 white rook, f6 white king, f5 white pawn, g4 black rook

Black to move, draw.

Black can not reach the Philidor position, but still draws.

45... Rf4!! 46. Ra8+ Kh7 47. Ke6 Kg7 48. Ra7+ Kf8 49. Kf6 Kg8 50. Ra8+ Kh7 51. Rf8 Ra4! 52. Rf7+ Kg8 53. Re7 Kf8 54. Re6 Ra7 55. Rb6 Rf7+ 56. Kg5 Ra7 57. f6 Kf7 ½–½

=== Ward vs. Emms, 1997 ===
Ward vs. Emms, 1997

Position: g6 black king, b5 black rook, g5 black pawn, g4 white king, c3 white rook

Black to move, draw.

95... Rb4+ 96. Kg3 Kh5 97. Ra3 Rg4+ 98. Kh3 Rh4+ 99. Kg3 Rb4 100. Re3 Rb5 101. Ra3 g4 102. Rc3 Kg5 103. Ra3 Rc5 ½–½

== Subtle differences ==
Nikolay Grigoriev, 1937

Position: b7 black rook, e7 white king, e6 white pawn, g6 black king, a1 white rook

White to move wins.
Grigoriev, 1937

Position: b7 black rook, e7 white king, e6 white pawn, g6 black king, a4 white rook

White to move, draw.

There can be subtle differences in positions that make the difference between a win and a draw. Two examples of this are shown in the diagrams.

Grigoriev, 1937

Position: e7 white king, g7 black king, e6 white pawn, b2 black rook, d1 white rook

Black to move, White wins.
Siegbert Tarrasch, 1906

Position: e7 white king, g7 black king, e6 white pawn, a2 black rook, d1 white rook

Black to move, draw.

== Zugzwang ==
There are exactly 209 positions of reciprocal zugzwang among rook and pawn versus rook endgames. All of them were tabulated and published. The full list is available online. Some of the zugzwangs are easy to understand (see position at the middle); some requires up to 54 moves to win. The position at left is a position that could have occurred in the 1961 game between Viacheslav Kalashnikov and the young Anatoly Karpov. White to move in this position draws, but Black to move loses. Karpov's 49th move in the actual game avoided the zugzwang and the game was drawn.

Kalashnikov vs. Karpov
(analysis position)

Position: d7 black king, e5 white rook, g5 white pawn, e4 white king, f1 black rook

After alternate 49th move for Black. Mutual zugzwang: White to move draws, Black to move loses.
Easy-to-understand zugzwang
(Haworth № KRPKR-00025)

Position: c8 black king, c7 white pawn, a6 black rook, b6 white rook, c6 white king

White to move draws, Black to move loses.
Longest-to-win zugzwang of this type
(№ KRPKR-00149)

Position: c3 white rook, d3 white pawn, e3 black rook, c1 white king, e1 black king

White to move draws, Black to move loses in 54 moves.

== Rook and two pawns versus rook ==
Levenfish and Smyslov, diagram 124

Position: a6 white rook, e6 white pawn, f6 black king, h6 white king, h5 white pawn, e1 black rook

White to move wins, starting with 1.Kh7. Black to move draws, starting with 1...Re5!

A rook and two pawns generally win against a rook, but there are exceptions. In actual games, the side with the pawns wins 82% of the time.

- Positions with doubled pawns are usually a draw if the defending king can get in front of the pawns. If the defending king cannot get in front of the pawns, the outcome depends on which file the pawns are on and where the defending king is cut off. If the defending king is cut off by more than one file, the pawns win, except if they are rook pawns. If the pawns are on the c through f file then they win if the opposing king is cut off by one file (or more) on the long side, otherwise they draw.
- Positions with two connected pawns are usually won easily, but there can be difficulties if one pawn is a rook pawn. There are also positions where the defender can draw by blockading the pawns and some other drawn positions.
- Positions with isolated pawns have fewer chances to win than with connected pawns. Positions with two rook pawns are often a draw. A position with a rook pawn and bishop pawn on the same side of the board is usually a draw if they are not far advanced, but the defense is difficult. Overall, the rook pawn and bishop pawn win in 61% of games. The rook pawn and bishop pawn almost always win if they both reach their sixth rank. Other drawn positions exist.

== See also ==
- Chess endgame
- Lucena position
- Philidor position
- Tarrasch rule
