= Luis Ramírez de Lucena =

Spanish chess player and theorist

- Born: c. 1465; Lucena
- Died: c. 1530
- Education: University of Salamanca
- Occupations: Author, chess player
- Known for: Lucena position

Luis Ramírez de Lucena (c. 1465 – c. 1530) was a Spanish chess player who published the earliest surviving chess book. He is believed to be the son of humanist writer and diplomat Juan de Lucena.

== Book ==
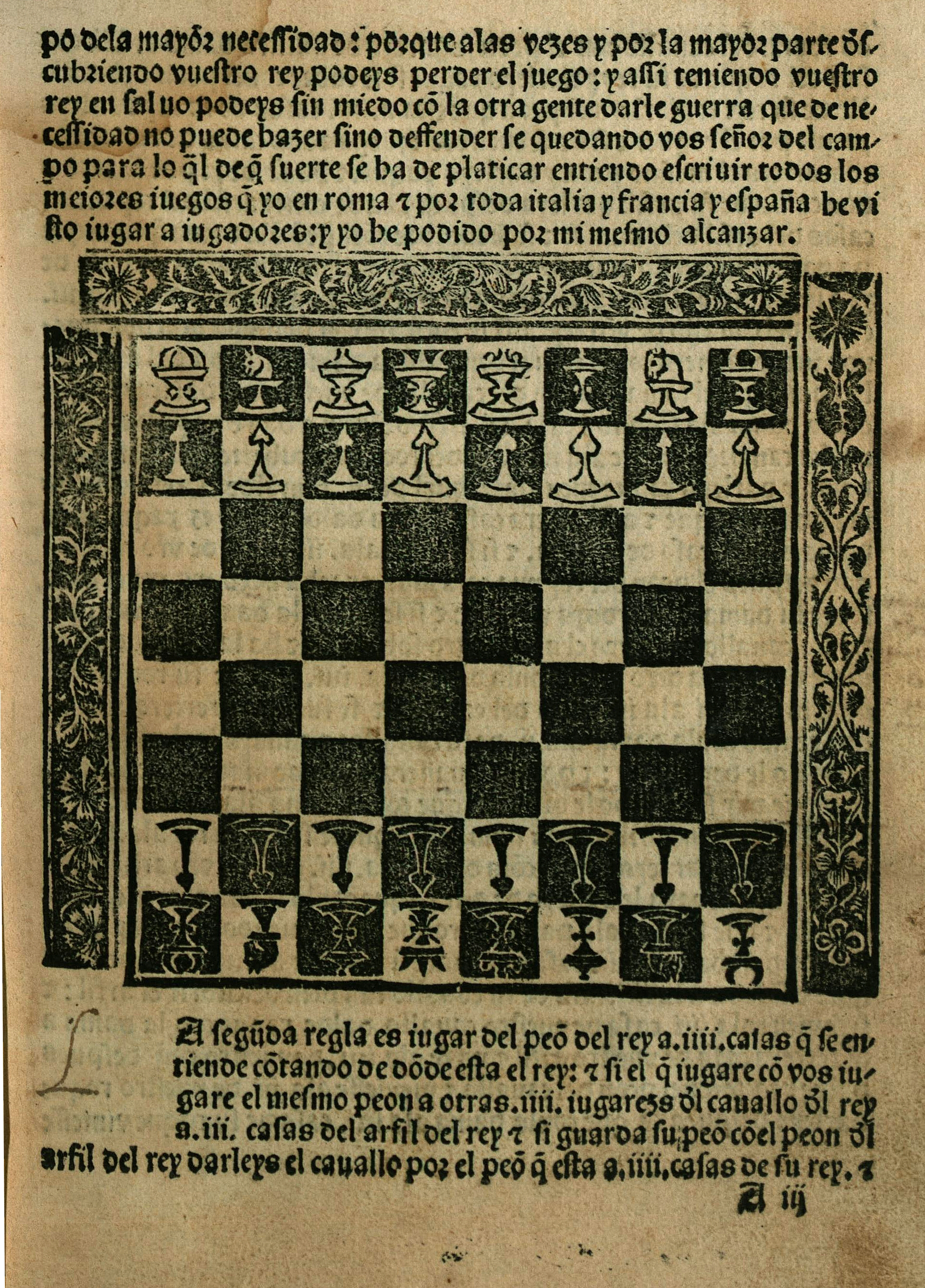
A page from his book

Lucena wrote the oldest surviving printed book on chess, Repetición de Amores y Arte de Ajedrez con CL [150] Juegos de Partido ("Repetition of Love and the Art of Playing Chess with 150 Games"), published in Salamanca around 1497. The book includes analysis of eleven chess openings but also contains many elementary errors that led chess historian H. J. R. Murray to suggest that it was prepared in a hurry. The book was written when the rules of chess were taking their modern form (see origins of modern chess), and some of the 150 positions in the book reflect the rules of the old game while others reflect that of the new. Fewer than a dozen copies of the book exist.

Commentators have suggested that much of the material was copied from Francesc Vicent's now-lost 1495 work Libre dels jochs partits dels schacs en nombre de 100.

The Lucena position is named after him, even though it does not appear in his book. (It was first published in 1634 by Alessandro Salvio.) The smothered mate (later named Philidor's legacy) is in the book.

== Sources ==
- Hooper, David; Whyld, Kenneth (1996). The Oxford Companion to Chess. Oxford University. ISBN 0-19-280049-3.
- Matulka, Barbara (1931). An anti-feminist treatise of fifteenth century Spain: Lucena's Repetición de Amores. Comparative Literature Series. New York Institute of French Studies.
