= Chess endgame =

Final phase in the game of chess

The endgame (or ending) is the final stage of a chess game which occurs after the middlegame. It begins when few pieces are left on the board.

Position: d7 black rook, f7 black king, g7 black pawn, f6 black pawn, b3 white rook, g3 white pawn, f2 white pawn, g2 white king, h2 white pawn

A typical endgame position

The line between the middlegame and the endgame is often not clear, and may occur gradually or with a quick exchange of pieces. The endgame, however, tends to have different characteristics from the middlegame, and the players have correspondingly different strategic concerns. In particular, pawns become more important as endgames often revolve around attempts to promote a pawn by advancing it to the eighth rank. The king, which normally is kept safe during the game, becomes active in the endgame, as it can help escort pawns to promotion, attack enemy pawns, protect other pieces, and restrict the movement of the enemy king. Not all chess games reach an endgame; some of them end earlier.

All chess positions with up to seven pieces on the board have been solved by endgame tablebases, so the outcome (win, loss, or draw) of best play by both sides in such positions is known. However, most endgames are not solved, and even those which are can be difficult for humans to play, so textbooks teach useful strategies and tactics about them. The body of chess theory devoted to endgames is known as endgame theory. Compared to opening theory, which changes frequently, giving way to middlegame positions that fall in and out of popularity, endgame theory is less subject to change.

Many endgame studies have been composed; they consist of endgame positions which are solved by finding a win for White when there is no obvious way to win, or finding a draw when White appears to lose. In some compositions, the starting position would be unlikely to occur in an actual game; but if the starting position is not artificial, the composition may be incorporated into endgame theory.

Endgames are usually classified based on the type of pieces that remain.

== The start of the endgame ==
There is no strict criterion for when an endgame begins, and different authors have different opinions. The former World Chess Champion Alexander Alekhine said, "We cannot define when the middle game ends and the endgame starts." Using the standard system for chess piece relative value, Speelman considers that endgames are positions in which each player has thirteen or fewer points in material (not counting the king). Alternatively, they are positions in which the king can be used actively, but there are some famous exceptions. Minev characterizes endgames as positions having four or fewer pieces other than kings and pawns. Fine considers endgames to be positions without queens. Flear considers endgames to be positions where both players have at most one piece (other than kings and pawns) whereas Dvoretsky considers them to be positions in which at least one player has such a material configuration. Some problem composers believe that the endgame starts when the player to move can force a win or a draw against any variation of moves.

Alburt and Krogius give three characteristics of an endgame:

1. Endgames favor an aggressive king.
2. Passed pawns increase greatly in importance.
3. Zugzwang is often a factor in endgames and rarely in other stages of the game.

Mednis and Crouch address the question of what constitutes an endgame negatively. They believe that the game is not in the endgame if these apply:

- better development;
- open files for attacking;
- vulnerable king position;
- misplaced pieces.

== General considerations ==
Generally, the player having a material advantage tries to exchange pieces but avoids exchanging pawns in the endgame. Some exceptions to this are:

1. Endings in which both sides have two rooks and some pawns – the player with more pawns should not exchange a pair of rooks
2. Endings in which both sides have bishops on opposite colors with other pieces – the stronger side should avoid exchanging the other pieces
3. Endings in which all the pawns are on the same side of the board – the stronger side should try to create a passed pawn by exchanging pawns

Usually, endings with pawns on both sides of the board are easier to win and the first player to promote a pawn to a queen wins if the opponent is unable to do so on the turn immediately after.

Max Euwe and Walter Meiden give these five generalizations:

1. In king and pawn endings, an extra pawn is decisive in more than 90 percent of the cases.
2. In endgames with pieces and pawns, an extra pawn is a winning advantage in 50 to 60 percent of the cases. It becomes more decisive if the stronger side has a positional advantage.
3. The king plays an important role in the endgame.
4. Initiative is more important in the endgame than in other phases of the game. In rook endgames, the initiative is usually worth at least a pawn.
5. Two connected passed pawns are very strong. If they reach their sixth rank, they are as powerful as a rook.

== Common types of endgames ==
=== Endings with no pawns ===
==== Basic checkmates ====
Many endings without pawns have been solved, that is, best play for both sides from any starting position can be determined, and the outcome (win, loss, or draw) is known. For example, the following are all wins for the side with pieces:

1. king and queen against a king—A queen, with its king, can easily checkmate a lone king.
2. king and rook against a king
3. king and two bishops of opposite color against a king
4. king, bishop, and knight against a king

See Wikibooks – Chess/The Endgame for a demonstration of the first two checkmates, which are generally taught in textbooks as basic knowledge. The last two are sometimes taught as basic knowledge as well, although the procedure for mate with bishop and knight is relatively difficult and many tournament players do not know it.

==== Other endings with no pawns ====
The ending of king and bishop versus king is a trivial draw, in that checkmate is not even possible. Likewise for king and knight versus king.

Two knights cannot force checkmate against a lone king (see Two knights endgame). While there is a board position that allows two knights to checkmate a lone king, such requires a careless move by the weaker side to execute. If the weaker side also has material (besides the king), checkmate is sometimes possible. The winning chances with two knights are insignificant except against a few pawns. The procedure can be long and difficult. In competition, the fifty-move rule will often result in the game being drawn first.

The endgame of king and three knights against king will not normally occur in a game, but it is of theoretical interest. The three knights win.

Fine & Benko, diagram 967

Position: a8 black king, a7 black knight, a6 white king, b1 white rook

White to play wins (Kb6); Black to play draws (...Nc8).

Two of the most common pawnless endgames (when the defense has a piece in addition to the king) are (1) a queen versus a rook and (2) a rook and bishop versus a rook. A queen wins against a rook — see Queen versus rook endgame. A rook and bishop versus a rook is generally a theoretical draw, but the defense is difficult and there are winning positions (see Rook and bishop versus rook endgame).

=== King and pawn endings ===
King and pawn endgames involve only kings and pawns on one or both sides. International Master Cecil Purdy said, "Pawn endings are to chess as putting is to golf." Any endgame with pieces and pawns has the possibility of simplifying into a pawn ending.

In king and pawn endings, an extra pawn is decisive in more than 90 percent of the cases. Getting a passed pawn is crucial (a passed pawn is one which does not have an opposing pawn on its file or on adjacent files on its way to promotion). Nimzowitch once said that a passed pawn has a "lust to expand". An outside passed pawn is particularly deadly. The point of this is a deflection – while the defending king is preventing the outside passed pawn from queening, the attacking king wins pawns on the other side.

Opposition is an important technique that is used to gain an advantage. When two kings are in opposition, they are on the same file (or rank) with one empty square separating them. The player having the move loses the opposition. That player must move the king and allow the opponent's king to advance. However, the opposition is a means to an end, which is penetration into the enemy position. The attacker should try to penetrate with or without the opposition. The tactics of triangulation and zugzwang as well as the theory of corresponding squares are often decisive.

Unlike most positions, king and pawn endgames can usually be analyzed to a definite conclusion, given enough skill and time. An error in a king and pawn endgame almost always turns a win into a draw or a draw into a loss – there is little chance for recovery. Accuracy is most important in these endgames. There are three fundamental ideas in these endgames: opposition, triangulation, and the Réti manoeuvre.

==== King and pawn versus king ====
Müller & Lamprecht,
diagram 2.11

Position: a5 white king, a4 white pawn, d4 black king

White to move wins with 1.Kb6. Black to move draws with 1...Kc5.
Müller & Lamprecht
diagram 2.03

Position: d8 black king, d6 white king, e6 white pawn

White to play draws. Black to play loses after 1...Ke8 2.e7 Kf7 3.Kd7 and the pawn queens.

King and pawn versus king is one of the most basic endgames. A draw results if the defending king can reach the square in front of the pawn or the square in front of that (or capture the pawn). If the attacking king can prevent that, the king will assist the pawn in being promoted to a queen or rook, and checkmate can be achieved. A rook pawn is an exception because the king may not be able to get out of the way of its pawn.

=== Knight and pawn endings ===
Knight and pawn endgames feature clever manoeuvring by the knights to capture opponent pawns. While a knight is poor at chasing a passed pawn, it is the ideal piece to block a passed pawn. Knights cannot lose a tempo, so knight and pawn endgames have much in common with king and pawn endgames. As a result, Mikhail Botvinnik stated, “A knight ending is really a pawn ending.”

==== Knight and pawn versus knight ====
Fine & Benko, diagram 228

Position: a8 black king, c7 white king, a5 black knight, b5 white pawn, c5 white knight

White to play wins; Black to play draws.

Knight and pawn versus knight is generally a draw since the knight can be sacrificed for the pawn, however, the king and knight must be covering squares in the pawn's path. If the pawn reaches the seventh rank and is supported by its king and knight, it usually promotes and wins. In this position, White to move wins: 1. b6 Nb7! 2. Ne6! Na5 3. Kc8! N-any 4. Nc7#. If Black plays the knight to any other square on move 2, White plays Kc8 anyway, threatening b7+ and promotion if the knight leaves the defense of the b7 square. Black to move draws starting with 1... Nc4 because White cannot gain a tempo.

=== Bishop and pawn endings ===
Molnar vs. Nagy, 1966

Position: e7 black king, f7 black bishop, h7 black pawn, c6 black pawn, g6 black pawn, h6 white pawn, b5 black pawn, c5 white pawn, e5 white pawn, g5 white pawn, b4 white pawn, f4 white king, b3 white bishop

White to move. White has a good bishop, Black has a bad one.

Bishop and pawn endgames come in two distinctly different variants. If the opposing bishops go on the same color of square, the mobility of the bishops is a crucial factor. A bad bishop is one that is hemmed in by pawns of its own color, and has the burden of defending them.

The adjacent diagram, from Molnar–Nagy, Hungary 1966, illustrates the concepts of good bishop versus bad bishop, opposition, zugzwang, and outside passed pawn. White wins with 1. e6! (vacating e5 for his king) 1... Bxe6 2. Bc2! (threatening Bxg6) 2... Bf7 3. Be4! (threatening Bxc6) 3... Be8 4. Ke5! (seizing the opposition [i.e. the kings are two orthogonal squares apart, with the other player on move] and placing Black in zugzwang—he must either move his king, allowing White's king to penetrate, or his bishop, allowing a decisive incursion by White's bishop) 4... Bd7 5. Bxg6!

==== Bishop and pawn versus bishop on the same color ====
Centurini

Position: g7 white king, f6 white pawn, g5 black king, h5 black bishop, c4 white bishop

Draw
Centurini, 1856

Position: c8 white king, d8 white bishop, b7 white pawn, c6 black king, h2 black bishop

Centurini showed how White to move wins. White also wins if Black is to move.

Two rules given by Luigi Centurini in the 19th century apply:

- The game is a draw if the defending king can reach any square in front of the pawn that is opposite in color to the squares the bishops travel on.
- If the defending king is behind the pawn and the attacking king is near the pawn, the defender can draw only if his king is attacking the pawn, he has the opposition, and his bishop can move on two diagonals that each have at least two squares available (other than the square it is on). This is the case for central pawns and the bishop pawn whose promotion square is not the same color as the bishop.

The position in the second diagram shows a winning position for White, although it requires accurate play. A knight pawn always wins if the defending bishop only has one long diagonal available.

Portisch vs. Tal, 1965

Position: d8 black king, a3 white king, g3 black pawn, a2 white bishop, c2 black bishop

Position before 67.Bd5

This position was reached in a game from the 1965 Candidates Tournament between Lajos Portisch and former World Champion Mikhail Tal. White must defend accurately and utilize reciprocal zugzwang. Often he has only one or two moves that avoid a losing position. Black was unable to make any progress and the game was drawn on move 83.

==== Bishops on opposite colors ====
Position: c7 black king, e7 black bishop, c6 white pawn, d5 white king, e5 white pawn, h5 white bishop

White to play, a draw. White wins if the pawn is on f5 instead of e5.

Endings with bishops of opposite color, meaning that one bishop works on the light squares, the other one working on dark squares, are notorious for their drawish character. Many players in a poor position have saved themselves from a loss by trading down to such an endgame. They are often drawn even when one side has a two-pawn advantage, since the weaker side can create a blockade on the squares on which his bishop operates. The weaker side should often try to make their bishop bad by placing their pawns on the same color of their bishop in order to defend their remaining pawns, thereby creating an impregnable fortress.

=== Bishop versus knight endings (with pawns) ===
Current theory is that bishops are better than knights about 60 percent of the time in the endgame. The more symmetrical the pawn structure, the better it is for the knight. The knight is best suited at an outpost in the center, particularly where it cannot easily be driven away, whereas the bishop is strongest when it can attack targets on both sides of the board or a series of squares of the same color.

Fine and Benko give four conclusions:

1. In general the bishop is better than the knight.
2. When there is a material advantage, the difference between the bishop and knight is not very important. However, the bishop usually wins more easily than the knight.
3. If the material is even, the position should be drawn. However, the bishop can exploit positional advantages more efficiently.
4. When most of the pawns are on the same color as the bishop (i.e. a bad bishop), the knight is better.

==== Bishop and pawn versus knight ====
Müller & Lamprecht, diagram 5.02

Position: c8 black king, d6 white pawn, d5 white king, h5 black knight, h2 white bishop

White to move wins; Black to move draws.

Bishop and pawn versus knight is a draw if the defending king is in front of the pawn or sufficiently close. The defending king can occupy a square in front of the pawn of the opposite color as the bishop and cannot be driven away. Otherwise the attacker can win.

==== Knight and pawn versus bishop ====
Muller & Lamprecht, diagram 5.23
(from Fine, 1941)

Position: c7 white king, d7 white pawn, d4 white knight, h4 black bishop, f1 black king

White to move wins; Black to move draws.

Knight and pawn versus bishop is a draw if the defending king is in front of the pawn or sufficiently near. The bishop is kept on a diagonal that the pawn must cross, and the knight cannot both block the bishop and drive the defending king away. Otherwise, the attacker can win.

=== Rook and pawn endings ===
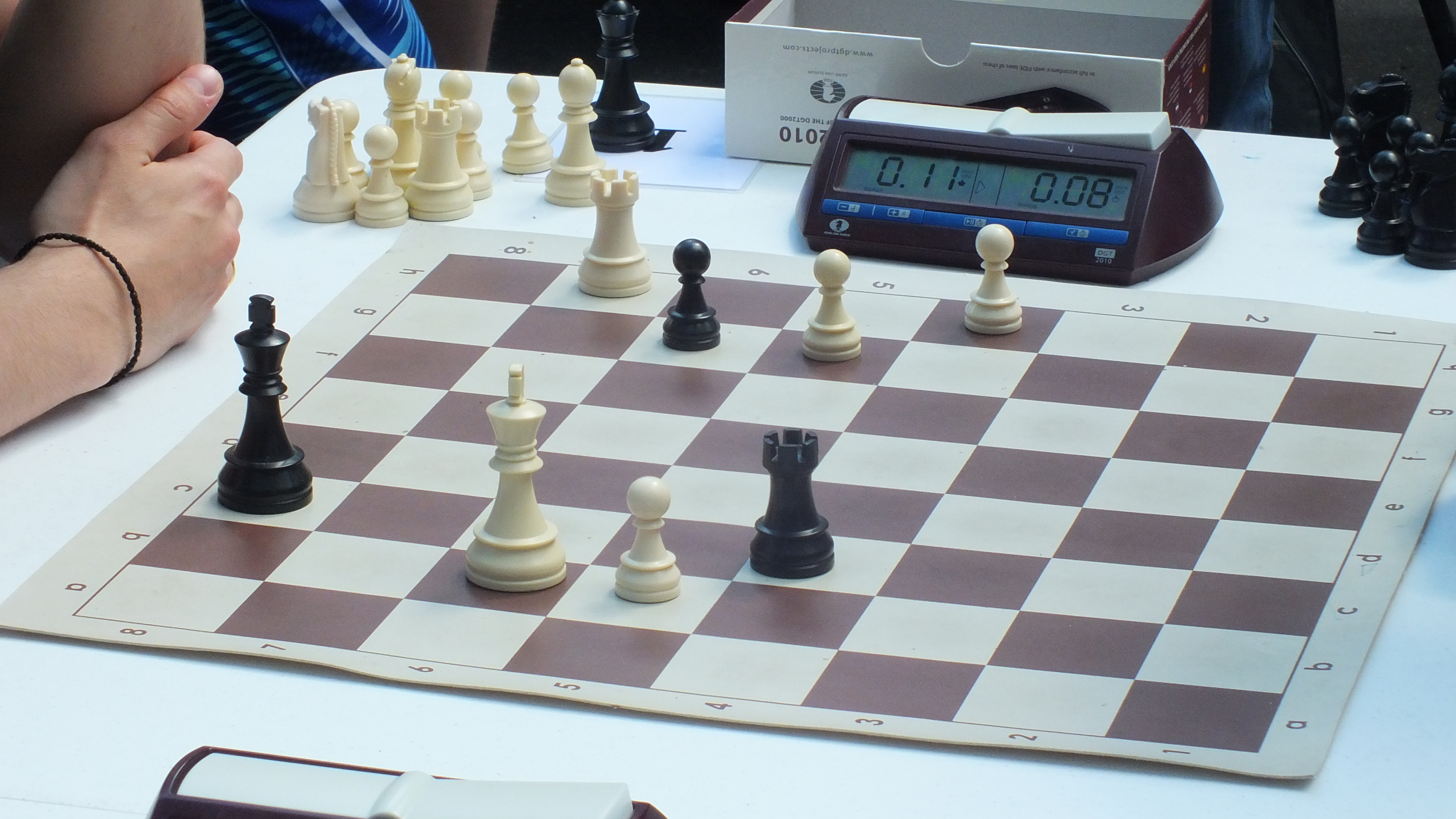
Rook ending in Moscow, Russia. White has two additional pawns, White to move

Rook and pawn endgames are often drawn in spite of one side having an extra pawn. (In some cases, two extra pawns are not enough to win.) An extra pawn is harder to convert to a win in a rook and pawn endgame than any other type of endgame except a bishop endgame with bishops on opposite colors. Rook endings are probably the deepest and most well studied endgames. They are a common type of endgame in practice, occurring in about 10 percent of all games (including ones that do not reach an endgame). These endgames occur frequently because rooks are often the last pieces to be exchanged. The ability to play these endgames well is a major factor distinguishing masters from amateurs. When both sides have two rooks and pawns, the stronger side usually has more winning chances than if each had only one rook.

Three rules of thumb regarding rooks are worth noting:

1. Rooks should almost always be placed behind passed pawns, whether one's own or the opponent's (the Tarrasch rule). A notable exception is in the ending of a rook and pawn versus a rook, if the pawn is not too far advanced. In that case, the best place for the opposing rook is in front of the pawn.
2. Rooks are very poor defenders relative to their attacking strength, so it is often good to sacrifice a pawn for activity.
3. A rook on the seventh rank can wreak mayhem among the opponent's pawns. The power of a rook on the seventh rank is not confined to the endgame. The classic example is Capablanca versus Tartakower, New York 1924 (see annotated game without diagrams or Java board)

An important winning position in the rook and pawn versus rook endgame is the so-called Lucena position. If the side with the pawn can reach the Lucena position, that side can win. There are several important drawing techniques, however, such as the Philidor position, the back-rank defense (rook on the first rank, for rook pawns and knight pawns only), the frontal defense, and the short-side defense. A general rule is that if the weaker side's king can get to the queening square of the pawn, the game is a draw and otherwise it is a win, but there are many exceptions.

==== Rook and pawn versus rook ====
Fine & Benko, diagram 646

Position: e8 white king, e7 white pawn, g7 black king, a2 black rook, f1 white rook

White to play wins because of the Lucena position. Black to play draws with 1...Ra8+, either because of perpetual check or winning the pawn.

Generally (but not always), if the defending king can reach the queening square of the pawn the game is a draw (see Philidor position), otherwise the attacker usually wins (if it is not a rook pawn) (see Lucena position). The winning procedure can be very difficult and some positions require up to sixty moves to win. If the attacking rook is two files from the pawn and the defending king is cut off on the other side, the attacker normally wins (with a few exceptions). The rook and pawn versus rook is the most common of the "piece and pawn versus piece" endgames.

The most difficult case of a rook and pawn versus a rook occurs when the attacking rook is one file over from the pawn and the defending king is cut off on the other side. Siegbert Tarrasch gave the following rules for this case:

For a player defending against a pawn on the fifth or even sixth ranks to obtain a draw, even after his king has been forced off the queening square, the following conditions must obtain: The file on which the pawn stands divides the board into two unequal parts. The defending rook must stand in the longer part and give checks from the flank at the greatest possible distance from the attacking king. Nothing less than a distance of three files makes it possible for the rook to keep on giving check. Otherwise it would ultimately be attacked by the king. The defending king must stand on the smaller part of the board.

(See the short side defense at Rook and pawn versus rook endgame.)

==== Quotation ====
- "All rook and pawn endings are drawn."

The context of this quote shows it is a comment on the fact that a small advantage in a rook and pawn endgame is less likely to be converted into a win. Mark Dvoretsky said that the statement is "semi-joking, semi-serious". This quotation has variously been attributed to Savielly Tartakower and to Siegbert Tarrasch. Writers Victor Korchnoi, John Emms, and James Howell, attribute the quote to Tartakower, whereas Dvoretsky, Andrew Soltis, Karsten Müller, and Kaufeld & Kern attribute it to Tarrasch. John Watson attributed to Tarrasch "by legend" and says that statistics do not support the statement. Pal Benko wonders if it was due to Vasily Smyslov. Attributing the quote to Tarrasch may be a result of confusion between this quote and the Tarrasch rule concerning rooks. The source of the quote is currently unresolved. Benko noted that although the saying is usually said with tongue in cheek, it is truer in practice than one might think.

=== Queen and pawn endings ===
In queen and pawn endings, passed pawns have paramount importance, because the queen can escort them to the promotion squares alone. The advancement of the passed pawn outweighs the number of pawns. The defender must resort to perpetual check. These endings are frequently extremely long affairs. For an example of a queen and pawn endgame see Kasparov versus the World – Kasparov won although he had fewer pawns because his was more advanced. For the ending with a queen versus a pawn, see Queen versus pawn endgame.

==== Queen and pawn versus queen ====
Müller & Lamprecht, diagram 9.12A

Position: f7 white queen, g7 white king, c6 black king, h5 white pawn, e2 black queen

White to play wins; Black to play draws.

The queen and pawn versus queen endgame is the second most common of the "piece and pawn versus piece" endgames, after rook and pawn versus rook. It is very complicated and difficult to play. Human analysts were not able to make a complete analysis before the advent of endgame tablebases. This combination is a win less frequently than the equivalent ending with rooks.

=== Rook versus a minor piece ===
Chéron, 1926

Position: e8 white rook, d6 black bishop, d5 black king, d4 black pawn, e4 black pawn, e2 white king

White to play draws; Black to play wins.

The difference in material between a rook and a minor piece is about two points or a little less, the equivalent of two pawns.

- A rook and a pawn versus a minor piece: normally a win for the rook but there are some draws. In particular, if the pawn is on its sixth rank and is a bishop pawn or rook pawn, and the bishop does not control the pawn's promotion square, the position is a draw. See Wrong bishop.
- A rook versus a minor piece: normally a draw but in some cases the rook wins, see pawnless chess endgame.
- A rook versus a minor piece and one pawn: usually a draw but the rook may win.
- A rook versus a minor piece and two pawns: usually a draw but the minor piece may win.
- A rook versus a minor piece and three pawns: a win for the minor piece.

If both sides have pawns, the result essentially depends on how many pawns the minor piece has for the exchange:

- No pawns for the exchange (i.e. same number of pawns on each side): the rook usually wins.
- One pawn for the exchange (i.e. minor piece has one more pawn): the rook usually wins, but it is technically difficult. If all of the pawns are on one side of the board it is usually a draw.
- Two pawns for the exchange: this is normally a draw. With a bishop either side may have winning chances. With a knight, the rook may have winning chances and the defense is difficult for the knight if the pawns are scattered.
- Three pawns for the exchange: this is normally a win for the minor piece.

=== Two minor pieces versus a rook ===
Capablanca vs. Lasker, 1914

Position: g8 black king, f7 black pawn, g7 black pawn, h7 black pawn, c5 white knight, b3 black rook, f3 white pawn, d2 white bishop, g2 white pawn, h2 white pawn, g1 white king

Black to play draws.

In an endgame, two minor pieces are approximately equivalent to a rook plus one pawn. The pawn structure is important. The two pieces have the advantage if the opponent's pawns are weak. Initiative is important in this endgame. The general outcome can be broken down by the number of pawns.

- The two pieces have one or more extra pawns: always a win for the pieces.
- Same number of pawns: usually a draw but the two pieces win more often than the rook.
- The rook has one extra pawn: usually a draw but either side may have winning chances, depending on positional factors.
- The rook has two additional pawns: normally a win for the rook.

=== Queen versus two rooks ===
Leko vs. Kramnik, World Ch. 2004

Position: a8 black rook, g8 black king, f7 black pawn, h7 black pawn, g6 black pawn, a5 black rook, h5 white pawn, f4 white queen, g4 white pawn, g3 white king, f2 white pawn

In this position, Kramnik (Black) played g5 and h6, maneuvered a rook to f4, and eventually captured White's backward f-pawn. He won after a blunder forced the trade of queen and rooks, and Leko resigned.

Without pawns, queen versus two rooks is normally drawn, but either side wins in some positions. A queen and pawn are normally equivalent to two rooks, which is usually a draw if both sides have an equal number of additional pawns. Two rooks plus one pawn versus a queen is also generally drawn. Otherwise, if either side has an additional pawn, that side normally wins. While playing for a draw, the defender (the side with fewer pawns) should try to avoid situations in which the queen and rooks are forcibly traded into a losing king and pawn endgame.

=== Queen versus rook and minor piece ===
van Wely vs. Yusupov, 2000

Position: g8 black king, d6 white rook, e6 black pawn, g6 black pawn, b4 black pawn, c3 black queen, e3 white pawn, f3 white bishop, g3 white pawn, f2 white pawn, g2 white king

Black to move won.

If there are no pawns, queen versus rook and minor piece is usually drawn, but either side wins in some positions. A queen is equivalent to a rook and bishop plus one pawn. If the queen has an additional pawn it wins, but with difficulty. A rook and bishop plus two pawns win over a queen.

=== Queen versus rook ===
Philidor, 1777

Position: b8 black king, b7 black rook, c6 white king, a5 white queen

White wins with either side to move.
D. Ponziani, 1782

Position: f8 black king, g7 black rook, e6 white queen, h1 white king

Black to move draws.

In a queen versus rook ending,

- Without pawns, the queen normally wins but it can be difficult and there are some drawn positions (see Queen versus rook endgame § Drawn positions).
- If the rook has one pawn drawing positions are possible, depending on the pawn and the proximity of the rook and king. See Fortress (chess) § Rook and pawn versus queen. Otherwise the queen wins.
- If the rook has two connected pawns the position is usually a draw. For any other two pawns, the queen wins except in the positions where a fortress with one pawn can be reached.
- If the rook has three or more pawns the position is usually a draw but there are cases in which the queen wins and some in which the rook wins.
- If the queen also has a pawn or pawns it wins except in unusual positions.

=== Piece versus pawns ===
Johann Berger, 1914
(Fine & Benko, diagram 1053)

Position: a8 white queen, f4 black pawn, g4 black pawn, h4 black king, h3 black pawn, a1 white king

White to play wins.

Fine & Benko, diagram 1054

Position: b8 white queen, f3 black pawn, g3 black pawn, h3 black king, h2 black pawn, a1 white king

White to play; Black wins.

There are many cases for a lone piece versus pawns. The position of the pawns is critical.

- Minor piece versus pawns: A minor piece versus one or two pawns is normally a draw, unless the pawns are advanced. Three pawns either draw or win, depending on how advanced they are. Three connected pawns win against a bishop if they all get past their fourth rank. A knight can draw against three connected pawns if none are beyond their fourth rank.
- Rook versus pawns: If the rook's king is not near, one pawn draws and two pawns win. If the rook's king is near, the rook wins over one or two pawns and draws against three. Four pawns usually win but the rook may be able to draw, depending on their position. More than four pawns win against the rook.
- Queen versus pawns: A queen can win against any number of pawns, depending on how advanced they are. The queen would win against eight pawns on the second rank but one pawn on the seventh rank may draw (see Queen versus pawn endgame) and two advanced pawns may win.

== Effect of tablebases on endgame theory ==
Endgame tablebases have made some minor corrections to historical endgame analysis, but they have made some more significant changes to endgame theory too. (The fifty-move rule is not taken into account in these studies.) Major changes to endgame theory as a result of tablebases include the following:

- Queen versus rook (see Queen versus rook endgame § Philidor's position). There are two changes here enabling the rook to put up a better defense, but the queen still wins. (a) People usually opt for a second-rank defense with the rook on the second rank and the king behind it (or symmetrical positions on the other edges of the board). Tablebases show that a third-rank defense takes a while to breach, which is difficult for a human to do. (b) People had assumed that the rook needs to stay as close to the king for as long as possible, but tablebases show that it is best to move the rook away from the king at some earlier point.
- Queen and pawn versus queen. Tablebases have shown that this can be won in many more positions than was thought, but the logic of the moves is presently beyond human understanding.
- Queen versus two bishops. This was thought to be a draw due to the existence of a drawing fortress position, but the queen can win most of the time by preventing the bishops from getting to the fortress. However, it can take up to 71 moves to force a win.

Position: f8 black king, f6 black knight, g6 black knight, c4 white queen, g3 white king

This position was thought to be drawn, but White to move wins. Some similar positions are actually drawn (e.g. with the queen on e2).
- Queen versus two knights. This was thought to be a draw, but the queen has more winning positions than was previously thought: 73.44% of positions are won by the queen, almost all of the remainder being positions where the side with two knights can immediately capture the queen – 97.59% of positions with the side with the queen to move are won by that side. Many analysts gave a position (see diagram) that they thought was a draw but it is actually a win for the queen. In the diagram, White checkmates in 43 moves, starting with 1. Qc7 (the only winning move). However, those percentages can be misleading. For instance, nearly 90% of all of these positions are wins for the queen, it is generally a draw if the king is not separated from the knights and they are on reasonable squares.. Most general results are based on the analysis of grandmasters using the tablebase data. Nunn says "The general result is undoubtedly a draw, but there are many losing positions, some of them very lengthy."

Position: f8 white bishop, b7 black knight, b6 black king, d5 white king, a4 white bishop

This position was thought to be drawn (Kling and Horwitz, 1851), but White wins.
- Two bishops versus a knight. This was thought to be a draw but the bishops generally win. However, it takes up to 66 moves. The position in the diagram was thought to be a draw for over one hundred years, but tablebases show that White wins in 57 moves. All of the long wins go through this type of semi-fortress position. It takes several moves to force Black out of the temporary fortress in the corner; then precise play with the bishops prevents Black from forming the temporary fortress in another corner. Before computer analysis, Speelman listed this position as unresolved, but "probably a draw".
- Queen and bishop versus two rooks. This was thought to be a draw but the queen and bishop usually win. It takes up to 84 moves.
- Rook and bishop versus bishop and knight, bishops on opposite colors. This was thought to be a draw but the rook and bishop generally win. It takes up to 98 moves. Magnus Carlsen successfully converted this configuration within the 50-move limit against Francisco Vallejo Pons in 2019. Even with best play from the starting RB v BN position, the stronger side would have won a piece well within 50 moves.
- Rook and bishop versus rook. The second-rank defense was discovered using tablebases.

== Longest known forced win ==
Position: b7 black rook, g5 black knight, f4 black king, b3 black bishop, d2 white king, h2 white knight, h1 white queen

Black's best move in this position is 1...Rd7+. White mates 545 moves later.

Position: b8 black knight, d8 black king, g7 white queen, f6 white king, g6 white pawn, h4 black bishop, b3 black rook

White to play mates in 549 moves.

Position: a8 white rook, h4 black queen, c3 white king, e3 white bishop, h3 black pawn, h2 white pawn, c1 white bishop, d1 black king

White can capture Black's queen in 584 moves, starting with 1. Rf8. (The resulting position is an easy win for White.)

Ignoring the fifty-move rule, the longest known forced win in an endgame takes 584 moves to convert, either by winning the defending side's queen or checkmate. It was found by Marc Bourzutschky in a partially-computed eight-piece tablebase. Previously, the longest known endgames based on seven-piece tablebases were 517 moves to conversion, or 549 moves to mate. The longest six-piece endgame takes 262 moves to force mate; for five pieces it is 115 moves. The longest four-piece ending, of king and queen versus king and rook, can take over 30 moves.

== Endgame classification ==
Endgames can be classified by the material on the board. The standard classification system lists each player's material, including the kings, in the following order: king, queen, bishops, knights, rooks, pawn. Each piece is designated by its algebraic symbol.

For example, if White has a king and pawn, and Black has only a king, the endgame is classified KPK. If White has bishop and knight, and Black has a rook, the endgame is classified KBNKR. KNBKR would not be standard.

In positions with two or more bishops on the board, a "bishop signature" may be added to clarify the relationship between the bishops. Two methods have been used. The informal method is to designate one color of squares as "x" and the other color as "y". An endgame of KBPKB can be written KBPKB x-y if the bishops are opposite-colored, or KBPKB x-x if the bishops are same-colored. The more formal method is to use a four digit suffix of the form abcd:

- a = number of White light-squared bishops
- b = number of White dark-squared bishops
- c = number of Black light-squared bishops
- d = number of Black dark-squared bishops

Thus, the aforementioned endgame can be written KBPKB_1001 for opposite-color bishops, and KBPKB_1010 for same-color bishops.

In positions with one or more rooks on the board and where one or both players have one or both castling rights, a castling signature may be added to indicate which castling rights exist. The method is to use a one to four character suffix formed by omitting up to three characters from the string KQkq.

Thus the endgame where White has bishop and rook and Black has a rook can be written KBRKR if no castling rights exist or KBRKR_Kq if White may castle on the king's side and Black may castle on the queen's side. In case the position also has two or more bishops the castling signature follows the bishop signature as in KBBNKRR_1100_kq.

GBR code is an alternative method of endgame classification.

The Encyclopedia of Chess Endings (ECE) by Chess Informant has a different classification scheme, somewhat similar to the ECO codes, but it is not widely used. The full system is a 53-page index that was contained in the book The Best Endings of Capablanca and Fischer. The code starts with a letter representing the most powerful piece on the board, not counting kings. The order is queen, rook, bishop, knight, and then pawn. (Figurines are used to stand for the pieces.) Each of these has up to 100 subclassifications, for instance R00 through R99. The first digit is a code for the pieces. For instance, R0 contains all endgames with a rook versus pawns and a rook versus a lone king, R8 contains the double rook endgames, and R9 contains the endings with more than four pieces. The second digit is a classification for the number of pawns. For instance, R30 contains endgames with a rook versus a rook without pawns or with one pawn and R38 are rook versus rook endings in which one player has two extra pawns.

== Frequency table ==
The table below lists the most common endings in actual games by percentage (percentage of games, not percentage of endings; generally pawns go along with the pieces).

Endgame frequency table
Percent	Side 1	Side 2
8.45	rook	rook
6.76	rook & bishop	rook & knight
3.45	two rooks	two rooks
3.37	rook & bishop	rook & bishop (same color)
3.29	bishop	knight
3.09	rook & knight	rook & knight
2.87	king & pawns	king (and pawns)
1.92	rook & bishop	rook & bishop (opposite color)
1.87	queen	queen
1.77	rook & bishop	rook
1.65	bishop	bishop (same color)
1.56	knight	knight
1.51	rook	bishop
1.42	rook & knight	rook
1.11	bishop	bishop (opposite color)
1.01	bishop	pawns
0.97	rook	knight
0.92	knight	pawns
0.90	queen & minor piece	queen
0.81	rook	two minor pieces
0.75	rook	pawns
0.69	queen	rook & minor piece
0.67	rook & pawn	rook (& no pawns)
0.56	rook & two pawns	rook (& no pawns)
0.42	queen	pawns
0.40	queen	rook
0.31	queen	two rooks
0.23	king & one pawn	king
0.17	queen	minor piece
0.09	queen & one pawn	queen
0.08	queen	two minor pieces
0.02	bishop & knight	king
0.01	queen	three minor pieces

== Quotations ==
- "[I]n order to improve your game, you must study the endgame before anything else; for, whereas the endings can be studied and mastered by themselves, the middlegame and the opening must be studied in relation to the endgame." (Emphasis in original.)
- "... the endgame is as important as the opening and middlegame ... three of the five losses sustained by Bronstein in his drawn ... match with Botvinnik in 1951 were caused by weak endgame play."
- "Studying the opening is just memorizing moves and hoping for traps, but studying the endgame is chess." – Joshua Waitzkin
- "If you want to win at chess, begin with the ending." – Irving Chernev
- "Repeating moves in an ending can be very useful. Apart from the obvious gain of time on the clock one notices that the side with the advantage gains psychological benefit." – Sergey Belavenets
- "It cannot be too greatly emphasized that the most important role in pawn endings is played by the king." – Siegbert Tarrasch
- "After a bad opening, there is hope for the middle game. After a bad middle game, there is hope for the endgame. But once you are in the endgame, the moment of truth has arrived." – Edmar Mednis
- "Patience is the most valuable trait of the endgame player." – Pal Benko

== Literature ==
There are many books on endgames; see Chess endgame literature for a large list and the history. Some of the most popular current ones are:

- Basic Chess Endings, by Reuben Fine and Pal Benko, 1941, 2003, McKay. ISBN 0-8129-3493-8. The 1941 edition by Fine was the first of the modern endgame books in English. It was revised in 2003 by Benko.
- Dvoretsky's Endgame Manual, second edition, by Mark Dvoretsky, 2006, Russel Enterprises. ISBN 1-888690-28-3. A modern manual book by a noted chess teacher.
- Encyclopedia of Chess Endings III – Rook Endings 2, Andras Adorjan, Alexander Beliavsky, Svetozar Gligorić, Robert Hübner, Anatoly Karpov, Garry Kasparov, Viktor Kortchnoi, Anthony Miles, Nikolay Minev, John Nunn and Jan Timman., 1986, Chess Informant, ISBN 86-7297-005-5. Comprehensive book with 1746 endings divided in groups according to ECE classification. Annotated as described at Chess punctuation.
- Essential Chess Endings: the Tournament Player's Guide, by James Howell, 1997, Batsford. ISBN 0-7134-8189-7. A small but comprehensive book.
- Fundamental Chess Endings, by Karsten Müller and Frank Lamprecht, 2001, Gambit Publications. ISBN 1-901983-53-6. Highly regarded – comprehensive and modern.
- Grandmaster Secrets: Endings, by Andrew Soltis, 1997, 2003, Thinker's Press, ISBN 0-938650-66-1. An elementary book.
- Just the Facts!: Winning Endgame Knowledge in One Volume, Lev Alburt and Nikolai Krogius, 2000, Newmarket Press. ISBN 1-889323-15-2. A good introductory book.
- Pandolfini's Endgame Course, by Bruce Pandolfini, 1988, Fireside, ISBN 0-671-65688-0. Many short elementary endgame lessons.
- Silman's Complete Endgame Course: From Beginner To Master, Jeremy Silman, 2007, Siles Press, ISBN 1-890085-10-3. Has a unique approach, it presents material in order of difficulty and the need to know of various classes of players. It starts with material for the absolute beginner and progresses up to master level material.
- Winning Chess Endings, by Yasser Seirawan, 2003, Everyman Chess. ISBN 1-85744-348-9. A good introductory book.
- One Pawn Saves the Day: A World Champion's Favorite Studies, by Sergei Tkachenko, 2017, Limited Liability Company Elk and Ruby Publishing House ISBN 5-950-04334-0. 100 studies whose common theme is that white ends up with just one pawn in the finale, yet manages to win or draw.
- One Knight Saves the Day: A World Champion's Favorite Studies, by Sergei Tkachenko, 2017, Limited Liability Company Elk and Ruby Publishing House ISBN 5-950-04335-9. 100 studies whose common theme is that white ends up with just one knight in the finale, yet manages to win or draw.
- One Bishop Saves the Day: A World Champion's Favorite Studies, by Sergei Tkachenko, 2017, Limited Liability Company Elk and Ruby Publishing House ISBN 5-950-04336-7. 100 studies whose common theme is that white ends up with just one bishop in the finale, yet manages to win or draw.
- One Rook Saves the Day: A World Champion's Favorite Studies, by Sergei Tkachenko, 2017, Limited Liability Company Elk and Ruby Publishing House ISBN 5-950-04337-5. 100 studies whose common theme is that white ends up with just one rook in the finale, yet manages to win or draw.

== See also ==
- Outline of chess: Endgame topics
- Checkmate
- Chess middlegame
- Chess opening
- Chess terminology

Endgame topics

- Chess endgame literature
- Corresponding squares
- Endgame study
- Endgame tablebase
- Endgame theory
- Fortress
- Opposition
- Pawnless chess endgame
- Prokeš maneuver
- Tarrasch rule
- Triangulation
- Wrong bishop
- Wrong rook pawn
- Zugzwang

Specific endgames

- Bishop and knight checkmate
- King and pawn versus king endgame
- Lucena position
- Opposite-colored bishops endgame
- Philidor position
- Queen and pawn versus queen endgame
- Queen versus pawn endgame
- Réti endgame study
- Rook and bishop versus rook endgame
- Rook and pawn versus rook endgame
- Saavedra position
- Two knights endgame
