= Philidor position =

Chess endgame drawing technique

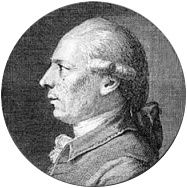
Philidor (1726–1795)

The Philidor position (or Philidor's position) is a chess endgame involving a drawing technique for the defending side in the rook and pawn versus rook endgame. This technique is known as the third-rank defense due to the positioning of the defending rook. It was analyzed by François-André Danican Philidor in 1777. Many rook and pawn versus rook endgames reach either the drawn Philidor position or the winning Lucena position. The defending side should try to reach the Philidor position; the attacking side should try to reach the Lucena position. Grandmaster Jesús de la Villa said, "[The Lucena and Philidor positions] are the most important positions in this type of endgame [...] and in endgame theory."

== Description ==
Philidor position, 1777

Position: e4 black pawn, f4 black king, a3 white rook, h2 black rook, e1 white king

White defends the Philidor position, and draws.

The diagram shows an example of Philidor's position. The important characteristics of the position are (from the point of view of the defender):

- The defending king (white king in the diagram) is on the queening square of the pawn (or adjacent to it). The pawn can be on any file.
- The opposing pawn has not yet reached the defender's third rank (its sixth rank).
- The opposing king is beyond the defender's third rank.
- The defender's rook is on the third rank, keeping the opposing king off that rank.

Black would like to get his king to the e3-square and threaten checkmate to force the white king away from the queening square of the pawn, e1. The white rook on the third rank prevents that. If Black checks with the rook from the side, White simply keeps the king in front of the pawn by alternating between squares e1 and e2. If Black offers an exchange of rooks White should take it, since the resulting king and pawn endgame is drawn.

So Black's only winning chance is to advance the pawn. The basic idea for the defender is to keep his rook on his third rank until the pawn advances to that rank, then check the opposing king from behind. Here is a possible continuation:

1... Rb2

If 1...e3, advancing the pawn immediately, then 2.Ra8 draws since Black's king cannot escape checks without losing the e-pawn, when the resulting position in which each side is playing with a king and a rook, is a draw.

2. Rc3 Ra2 3. Rb3 e3

There is little else for Black to try. If Black retreats the rook, the white king can advance, drawing easily. If Black shuffles (...Rc2–Ra2–Rc2), White can do the same (Ra3–Rh3–Ra3). With 3...e3, Black threatens to advance with Kf3, and if he is unopposed, checkmate with the rook or advance the pawn. (A passive defense does not work.)

4. Rb8!

Since now Black's king cannot move to e3, it is safe to move the rook away to the far end of the board (the defender's seventh or eighth rank). Note that 4.Rb4+?? loses immediately to 4...Kf3 when Black will checkmate or force the exchange of rooks followed by ...Kf2 and promotion of the pawn.

4... Kf3 5. Rf8+ Ke4 6. Re8+

The black king cannot hide from the checks without giving up the pawn; nor can he approach the rook:

6... Kf4 7. Rf8+ Ke5

7...Kg5 is also answered by 8.Re8.

8. Re8+

Black is forced to play ...Kd4 or ...Kf4, making no progress. The defender's rook must be on his seventh or eighth rank to employ the Philidor defense. (Positions can be drawn with the rook in other positions, using different defenses.)

To sum up the defense: the defender should keep his king in front of the opposing pawn and keep his rook on the third rank until the pawn advances to that rank, then go to the far end of the board (the seventh or eighth rank) and check the king from behind. If the attacker tries to get his king to his sixth rank by moving his rook to that rank first to block the checks, the defender simply exchanges rooks and has a drawn king and pawn versus king endgame.

Philidor, 1777

Position: e8 black king, a7 white rook, d5 white king, e5 white pawn, f4 black rook

White to move wins; Black to move draws.

Philidor actually studied a position that leads to the type of position above. In the diagrammed position, if it is Black's turn to move, he moves

1... Rb4

and then his rook will reach his third rank, and the position is basically the same as the diagram above, with colors reversed, e.g. 2. Ke6 Rb6+ 3. Kf5 Rc6 establishes the standard defensive setup.

If White is to move, he wins with accurate play by

1. Ke6 Kf8

2.Ra8# was threatened. Moving the king to the "short side" of the pawn is relatively better than to the other side.

2. Ra8+ Kg7 3. Kd6 Rd4+ 4. Ke7 Rb4 5. e6

etc., and wins. Note that Black reaches a draw after 1.Kd6? Re4!, for example 2.Ke6 Kf8 3.Ra8+ Kg7 4.Kd6 Kf7 and White cannot break through.

Position: e7 black king, b6 white rook, e4 white pawn, f4 white king, a1 black rook

Black to move can draw with 1...Ra5 2.e5 Ra1 and then checking from behind.

Philidor's defense can also be used if the pawn is less advanced. In that case, the defending rook can occupy its fourth rank instead of its third rank and the defending king should be on at least its second rank. When the pawn reaches the rank of the defending rook, the rook moves to its eighth rank to check the opposing king from behind (assuming that the opposing rook is not on that rank).

Philidor thought that the only way to draw was to keep the defending rook on its third rank until the pawn reached that rank and then attack from behind. In 1897, Max A.K.S. Karstedt (1868–1945) showed that this is not strictly true, and Johann Berger (1845–1933) expanded on that. There are other ways to draw; however, the alternate defenses are more complicated.

== See also ==
- Chess endgame
- Endgame tablebase
- Lucena position
- Rook and pawn versus rook endgame
