= Réti endgame study =

Chess endgame study with king and pawn versus king and pawn

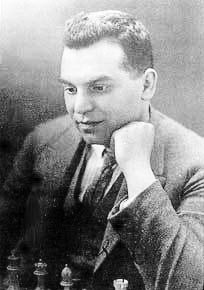
Richard Réti

The Réti endgame study is a chess endgame study by Richard Réti. It was published in 1921 in Kagans Neueste Schachnachrichten. It demonstrates how a king can make multiple threats and how it can take more than one path to a given location, using the same number of moves. It is covered in many books on the endgame (see chess endgame literature). The procedure is known as the "Réti Maneuver" or "Réti's Idea". Endgame composer Abram Gurvich called the theme "The Hunt of Two Hares" and it appears in many other studies and games. It is also called "chasing two birds at once".

== The study ==
Richard Réti, 1921

Position: h8 white king, a6 black king, c6 white pawn, h5 black pawn

White to play and draw

White is to move and draw in this position. At first inspection, it appears that White has no hope in drawing. His king is well outside the square of the black pawn (see King and pawn versus king endgame § Rule of the square) and the king is a long way from supporting his own pawn. However, White can draw by making king moves that have dual purposes. One goal is getting in the square of the black pawn, so it can be intercepted, and the other is getting to the d6-square to support the promotion of his own pawn.

The black king will have to spend two tempi to stop the white pawn from promoting, and this is the number of tempi the white king needs to gain in order to get into the square of the black pawn.

de la Villa, page 179

Position: e8 four, f8 two, g8 one, h8 white king, e7 five, f7 two, g7 one, h7 one, c6 white pawn, d6 nine, e6 three, f6 one, g6 two, h6 two, e5 one, f5 three, g5 five, h5 four, f4 black circle, g3 black circle, h2 black circle

Number of ways for the white king to get to squares in the minimum number of moves

The second diagram shows the number of ways that the white king can get to various squares in the minimum number of moves. There are nine ways to get to d6, but only one of them allows him to get into the square of the black pawn.

The solution is for the white king to follow the path on the diagonal marked by "1" and then follow the dots to intercept the black pawn (if necessary):

1. Kg7! h4

1...Kb6 transposes.

2. Kf6 Kb6

Black has to spend a tempo on preventing the white king from reaching his pawn. If 2...h3 then 3.Ke7 h2 4.c7 Kb7 5.Kd7 and both pawns promote, with a drawn position.

3. Ke5! Kxc6

Black has to spend another tempo to capture the pawn, to prevent the white king from protecting it. If 3...h3 then 4.Kd6 h2 5.c7 h1=Q 6.c8=Q, draw. Now the white king has gained enough tempi to get in the square of the black pawn and intercept it.

4. Kf4

Draw, since the white king can stop the pawn from promoting (e.g. 4...h3 5.Kg3 h2 6.Kxh2).

== Another study with the same idea ==
Richard Réti, 1928

Position: g7 black pawn, a6 black king, c6 white pawn, f6 black pawn, h6 black pawn, h5 white king

White to move and draw

Réti used the same idea in another study. The solution is:

1. Kg6 Kb6
2. Kxg7 f5
3. Kf6! f4
4. Ke5 f3
5. Kd6 f2
6. c7 f1=Q
7. c8=Q Qf4+
8. Kd5 ½–½

== Examples from games ==
=== Yates vs. Marshall ===
Yates vs. Marshall, 1929

Position: a4 black pawn, b4 white king, f2 white pawn, b1 black king

Black to move

In this game between Frederick Yates and Frank Marshall, Black draws using the same idea:

60... Kb2!

If 60...Kc2? 61.f4 wins.

61. Kxa4

If 61.f4?? then 61...a3 wins.

61... Kc3!
62. f4 Kd4 ½–½.

=== Lasker vs. Tarrasch ===
Lasker vs. Tarrasch, 1914

Position: g7 white king, a5 black pawn, b5 black pawn, c5 black pawn, f5 black king, b3 white pawn, b2 white pawn, h2 white pawn

White to move

In this 1914 game between World Champion Emanuel Lasker and Siegbert Tarrasch, Black exchanged down into this position because he thought it was a win, but White used the maneuver above to draw the game.

40. h4 Kg4 41. Kg6!

Threatening 42.h5. Black had only considered the line 41.Kf6? c4 42.bxc4 bxc4 43.Ke5 c3 44.bxc3 a4 45.Kd4 a3, winning.

41... Kxh4

This move is forced and the white king gains a tempo to return on a different diagonal which is not obstructed by his pawns.

42. Kf5 Kg3 43. Ke4 Kf2 44. Kd5 Ke3 45. Kxc5 Kd3 46. Kxb5 Kc2 47. Kxa5 Kxb3 ½–½

The theme of this endgame was used later by Réti in the study.
