= Triangulation (chess) =

Chess tactic

Triangulation is a tactic used in chess to put one's opponent in zugzwang (a position in which it is a disadvantage to move). Triangulation is also called losing a tempo or losing a move.

Triangulation occurs most commonly in endgames with only kings and pawns when one king can maneuver on three adjacent squares in the shape of a triangle and maintain the basic position while the opposing king only has two such squares. Thus, if one king triangulates by using three moves to return to the original square and the opposing king cannot do the same, he has lost a crucial tempo and reached the same position with the other player to move. Triangulation can occur in other endgames and even in some middlegames.

== Example ==
Triangulation

Position: b7 black pawn, d7 black king, b6 white pawn, c6 black circle, c5 white pawn, d5 white king, e5 white circle, d4 white circle

White to move. White needs it to be Black's move in this position, so he triangulates. The dots indicate triangulation squares for the white king.

Consider this position, with White to move. Here, Black has the opposition and is keeping the white king out. However, if White had the opposition (i.e. it were Black's move in this position), the black king would have to move away from d7 and allow the white king to advance. Black's king must stay close to where it is; he must prevent the c-pawn from advancing, and he must not let himself be driven to the edge of the board. The squares d5 and d7 are corresponding squares; when White's king is on d5, Black's king must be on d7, with White to move in order for Black to prevent the advance of the White king. White has a triangle of squares available: d5, e5, and d4. White can win by the following maneuver:

1. Ke5! (if 1. c6+ then 1... Kc8 draws. If 1... bxc6+ then 2. Kc5 wins, see king and pawn versus king endgame.)
1... Kc6 (if 1... Ke7 then 2. c6 and white wins by promoting the b pawn)
2. Kd4 Kd7
3. Kd5

and now the triangulation is complete and we have the same position but with Black to move. White has gained the opposition and Black is now in zugzwang. There may follow:

3... Kc8
4. Ke6! (diagonal opposition) Kd8
5. Kd6 (vertical opposition) Kc8
6. Ke7 Kb8
7. Kd7 Ka8
8. c6

and White will win. (There are other ways for White to win after their third move.)

== Triangulation with the king ==
Alburt vs. Kasparov, 1978

Position: e5 black circle, f5 black circle, e4 black king, h4 black pawn, f3 black pawn, h3 white pawn, f1 white king, g1 white circle

Black wins by 55...Kf5!

In this 1978 game between Lev Alburt and future World Champion Garry Kasparov, Black wins by triangulating:

55... Kf5!
56. Kg1 Ke5

and White resigned. After 57. Kf1 Ke4! 58. Kf2 Kf4 59. Kf1 Kg3, Black wins the white pawn.

=== Second example ===
Tal vs. Spassky, 1965

Position: c5 black pawn, f5 black rook, h5 black pawn, c4 white pawn, h4 white rook, c3 black circle, d3 black king, f3 black pawn, h3 white pawn, d2 black circle, f2 white king

Position before Black's 64th move

Triangulation can occur in endgames other than king and pawn endgames, such as this game in the 1965 Candidates Tournament, in which future World chess champion Boris Spassky defeated former world champion Mikhail Tal and won the right to challenge the then-current champion Tigran Petrosian. White would be in zugzwang if it were his move. Black achieves this through triangulation:

64... Kd2
65. Re4 Kc3!
66. Rh4 Kd3
67. 0-1

Now it is back to the same position, but with White to move, and now White is in zugzwang. White must lose the rook or allow the f-pawn to advance towards promotion .

=== Example in king and pawn endgame ===
Shirov vs. Grischuk, analysis position

Position: e8 black king, e7 white pawn, f7 black circle, d6 white pawn, c5 black pawn, g5 black pawn, h5 black pawn, c4 white pawn, g3 white circle, g2 white king, h2 white circle

White to move triangulates to put Black in zugzwang

Usually when a king triangulates in a king and pawn endgame, it is close to the other king and triangulation gains the opposition, putting the opponent in zugzwang. This position (from analysis of a game between Alexey Shirov and Alexander Grischuk in New Delhi in 2000) shows an example when the kings are far apart. White triangulates to put Black in zugzwang:

1. Kh2! Kf7
2. Kg3 Ke8
3. Kg2!

and amazingly Black is in zugzwang. The game could continue:

3... g4
4. Kg3 Kf7
5. Kf4 Ke8
6. Ke5 Kf7 (Black cannot allow White to move Ke6)
7. Kd5 g3
8. Kc6 g2 (If 8... Ke8 9. d7+ Kxe7 10. Kc7 and White wins easily)
9. Kd7 g1=Q
10. e8=Q+

and White wins.

== Triangulation with other pieces ==
For an example of triangulation with a queen, see the queen versus rook position at Philidor position. The game Fischer versus Taimanov, fourth match game shows a similar tactic with a bishop. A rook can also perform the maneuver, but a knight cannot.

=== Example with a rook ===
Topalov vs. Karpov, 2002

Position: b8 white king, h8 white circle, b7 white pawn, d7 black king, h7 white circle, h6 white rook, a4 black rook, h4 black pawn

White triangulates with the rook to put Black in zugzwang

In this game between future FIDE World Champion Veselin Topalov and former world champion Anatoly Karpov, White triangulates with his rook to put Black in zugzwang:

1. Rh7+! Kd8
2. Rh8+ Kd7
3. Rh6

back to the same position and Black is in zugzwang. The game continued:

3... Kd8
4. Rh7 zugzwang again
4... Rb4
5. Ka7 Ra4+
6. Kb6 1-0

== See also ==
- Key square
