= Corresponding squares =

Feature of chess relating to both kings' positions

In chess, two squares are corresponding squares (also known as relative squares, sister squares, or coordinate squares) if the occupation of one of these squares by a king requires the enemy king to move to the other square in order to hold the position. Corresponding squares exist in some chess endgames, usually ones that are mostly blocked. Usually, there are several groups of corresponding squares. In some cases, they indicate which square the defending king must move to in order to keep the opposing king away. In other cases, a maneuver by one king puts the other player in a situation where he cannot move to the corresponding square, so the first king is able to penetrate the position. The theory of corresponding squares is more general than opposition and is more useful in cluttered positions.

In this article, all members of a pair of corresponding squares are labeled with the same number, i.e. "1", "2", etc.

== Details ==
Corresponding squares are squares of reciprocal (or mutual) zugzwang. They occur most often in king and pawn endgames, especially with triangulation, opposition, and mined squares. A square that White can move to corresponds to a square that Black can move to. If one player moves to such a square, the opponent moves to the corresponding square to put the opponent in zugzwang.

== Examples ==
=== Example 1 ===
Corresponding squares

Position: c8 one, d8 three, e8 two, c7 black cross, d7 three, e7 black cross, c6 one, d6 white pawn, e6 two, c5 three, d5 three, e5 three

Numbered squares are corresponding squares in king and pawn versus king. Squares marked "x" are key squares.

One of the simplest and most important uses of corresponding squares is in this king and pawn versus king endgame. Assume that the black king is in front of the white pawn and the white king is behind or to the side of it. The black king is trying to block the pawn and the white king is supporting it. If the white king gets to any of the key squares (marked with "x"), he wins. Suppose both kings are on the squares labeled "1" (square c8 for Black and c6 for White). Then if it is Black to move White wins, because after Black moves to d8 White pushes the pawn forcing Black to move to e7; however, if it is White to move then Black keeps a draw, since pushing the pawn now results in a stalemate, and White therefore cannot advance. This position is a reciprocal zugzwang. Therefore neither party wants to move first to a square labeled "1" if the other party can respond by moving to the corresponding square.

The squares labeled "2" are similar corresponding squares. If the white king is on the d5-square (the middle one labeled "3"), he is threatening to move to either the "1" square or the "2" square. Therefore, the black king must be in a position to move to either his "1" square or his "2" square in order to hold the draw, so he must be on one of his "3" squares. This makes the defense for Black clear: shift between the squares labeled "3" until the white king moves to his "1" or "2" square, and then go to the corresponding square. If the black king moves to the "1" or "2" squares under any other circumstances, the white king moves to the corresponding square (or if this is not possible because the white king is on the opposite file, move forward to the square diagonally opposite the black king); then after the black king moves, White advances the pawn, will promote it and win.

The squares on the fifth rank are not corresponding squares to those labeled "3" for Black, since with both kings on such squares it will be a draw whoever has the move. They are so marked only to indicate that as long as the white king is on one of them, the black king must be on one of his "3" squares to draw.

=== Example 2 ===
Rösch vs. Mast, 1995

Position: f5 black pawn, e4 black king, d3 one, f3 one, h3 black pawn, d2 two, e2 white king, f2 two, h2 white pawn, d1 three, f1 three

White to move, but drawn with either side to move

In this example, key squares (see king and pawn versus king endgame) are e1, e2, e3, and f3. If the black king gets to any of those squares, Black wins. The job of the white king is to keep the black king off those squares. One might think that Black has the advantage, since he has the opposition. White can defend the two key squares of e3 and f3 by oscillating between e2 and f2. White's defense is simple if he observes the corresponding squares:

1. Kf2!

Keeping the black king off e3 and f3.

1... Kd3 2. Kf3!

Moving to the corresponding square.

2... Kd2 3. Kf2! Kd1 4. Kf1!

Each time the black king moves to a numbered square, the white king moves to the corresponding square.

=== Example 3: Separated key squares ===
A study by Nikolay Grigoriev, 1924

Position: b5 six, c5 two, b4 one, d4 three, f4 black king, a3 black cross, b3 black cross, c3 black pawn, d3 white pawn, e3 four, f3 five, a2 one, c2 white pawn, e2 black cross, f2 black cross, a1 six, b1 two, c1 three, d1 four, e1 white king

White to move wins, Black to move draws. (e1 is a "5" for White.)

In this position, the squares marked with "x" are key squares and the e1-square is a "5" for White. If White occupies any of the key squares, he wins. With separated key squares, the shortest path connecting them is significant. If White is to move in this position, he wins by seizing a key square by moving to e2 or f2. If Black is to move, he draws by moving to his "5" square. Black maintains the draw by always moving to the square corresponding to the one occupied by the white king.

=== Example 4: Triangulation ===
Study by Grigoriev

Position: b5 black pawn, b4 white pawn, d4 black cross, f4 three, b3 one, c3 two, d3 white pawn, e3 two, f3 black king, b2 one, c2 three, d2 white king, e2 black cross

The white king is on one of his "1" squares, the black king is on his "1" square. Key squares are e2, e3, and d4, marked with "x" except for e3. The corresponding squares help show White's winning process.

In this position, e2, e3, and d4 are key squares. If the white king can reach any of them, White wins. The black king cannot move out of the "square" of White's d-pawn (see king and pawn versus king endgame), otherwise it will promote. The square c3 is adjacent to d4 and the "1" square the white king is on, so it is numbered "2". Therefore, e3 is "2" for Black. White threatens to move to c2, so this is labeled "3". Since Black must be able to move to "1" and "2", f4 is his corresponding "3" square. If the white king is on b2 or b3, he is threatening to move to "2" or to "3", so those are also "1" squares for him. White has more corresponding squares, so he can outmaneuver Black to win.

1. Kc2 Kf4 2. Kb3 Kf3 3. Kb2 Kf4

The black king must leave his "1" square, and has no corresponding "1" square to which to move.

4. Kc2! Kf3

The white king moved to his "3" square but the black king is on his "3" square, so he cannot move to "3". White has used triangulation.

5. Kd2

Back to the starting position, but with Black to move.

5... Kf4

Black is on his "1" square, so cannot move to a "1" square.

6. Ke2!

White occupies a key square and can support the advance of his pawn until he is able to win the black pawn, e.g.: 6...Kf5 7.Ke3 Ke5 8.d4+ Kd5 9.Kd3 Kd6 10.Ke4 Ke6 11.d5+ Kd6 12.Kd4 Kd7 13.Kc5.

=== Lasker–Reichhelm position ===
Lasker & Reichhelm, 1901

Position: a8 four, b8 five, c8 four, d8 seven, e8 eight, a7 black king, b7 three, c7 two, d7 seven, e7 eight, f7 nine, g7 zero, h7 nine, b6 one, d6 black pawn, f6 zero, g6 six, h6 six, a5 black pawn, b5 black cross, d5 white pawn, f5 black pawn, g5 black cross, h5 black cross, a4 white pawn, c4 one, d4 white pawn, f4 white pawn, h4 six, b3 two, c3 three, d3 two, e3 seven, f3 eight, g3 nine, h3 zero, b2 four, c2 five, d2 four, e2 seven, f2 eight, a1 white king, b1 two, c1 three, d1 two, e1 seven, f1 eight

White to move wins, Black to move draws. "X" indicates key squares, some of the corresponding squares are marked.

One of the most famous and complicated positions solved with the method of corresponding squares is this endgame study composed by World Champion Emanuel Lasker and Gustavus Charles Reichhelm in 1901. It is described in the 1932 treatise L'opposition et cases conjuguées sont réconciliées (Opposition and Sister Squares are Reconciled), by Vitaly Halberstadt and Marcel Duchamp. Black’s king is under a “2” corresponding square.

1. Kb1 (next move he can choose from 3, 4 or 5) Kb7 (Black chooses 3)
2. Kc1 (since Black chose 3 in last move) Kc7 (Black chooses 2)
3. Kd1 (since Black chose 2 in last move, now White can choose between 3, 4, 5, 7) Kd8 (next move he can choose from 2, 4, 7, 8)
4. Kc2 (he chooses 5, because Black cannot choose 5 now) Kc8 (he chose 4)
5. Kd2 (chooses 4 same as Black's move) Kd7 (he chooses 7)
6. Kc3 (he chooses 3, since Black cannot come to 3) Kc7 (he chose 2)
7. Kd3 (same as Black's last move)

and White wins because 7...Kb7 and 7...Kb6 allow 8.Ke3, eventually penetrating on the kingside via h5 to capture the f5-pawn, while any other moves by Black allow the white king to reach b5 via c4 and then capture the a5-pawn. Each of White's first seven moves above is the only one that wins.
