= Tempo (chess) =

Turn or single move in chess

Example

Position: h8 white circle, h5 white circle, h1 white rook

Moving the rook to h5 and then to h8 would lose a tempo.
Euwe and Hooper, 1959

Position: f8 black king, h7 white rook, b4 black pawn, c3 black pawn, g2 white king

An important tempo – whoever moves wins.

In chess and other chess-like games, a tempo (from Italian: tempo, lit. 'time') is a "turn" or single move (a half-move or ply made either by White or Black). When a player achieves a desired result in one fewer move, the player is said to "gain a tempo"; conversely, when a player takes one more move than necessary, the player is said to "lose a tempo". Similarly, when a player forces their opponent to make moves not according to their initial plan, one is said to "gain tempi" because the opponent is wasting moves. A move that gains a tempo is often called "a move with tempo".

A simple example of losing a tempo may be moving a rook from the h1-square to h5 and from there to h8 in the first diagram; simply moving from h1 to h8 would have achieved the same result with a tempo to spare. Such maneuvers do not always lose a tempo, however—the rook on h5 may make some threat which needs to be responded to. In this case, since both players have "lost" a tempo, the net result in terms of time is zero, but the change brought about in the position may favor one player more than the other.

== Gaining a tempo ==
Position: a8 black rook, b8 black knight, c8 black bishop, e8 black king, f8 black bishop, g8 black knight, h8 black rook, a7 black pawn, b7 black pawn, c7 black pawn, e7 black pawn, f7 black pawn, g7 black pawn, h7 black pawn, d5 black queen, a2 white pawn, b2 white pawn, c2 white pawn, d2 white pawn, f2 white pawn, g2 white pawn, h2 white pawn, a1 white rook, b1 white knight, c1 white bishop, d1 white queen, e1 white king, f1 white bishop, g1 white knight, h1 white rook

Scandinavian Defense after 1.e4 d5 2.exd5 Qxd5. Now 3.Nc3 gains a tempo, as Black is forced to move their queen.

Gaining tempo may be achieved, for example, by developing a piece while delivering check, though here, too, if the check can be countered by the development of a piece, the net result may be zero. If the check can be blocked by a useful pawn move which also drives the checking piece away, the check may even lose a tempo.

In general, making moves with gain of tempo is desirable. A player is said to have the initiative if they are able to keep making moves which force their opponent to respond in a particular way or limit their responses. The player with the initiative has greater choice of moves and can to some extent control the direction the game takes, though this advantage is only relative and may not be worth very much (having a slight initiative when a rook down in material, for example, may be worthless).

A move that comes "with a tempo on a piece" is a move that gains a tempo by attacking that piece. For example, in the Scandinavian Defense opening, after 1.e4 d5 2.exd5 Qxd5, White's 3.Nc3 comes "with a tempo on the queen": the knight attacks Black's queen, forcing it to move again, thus White gains a tempo. A similar move gains a tempo in the Center Game.

== Losing a tempo ==
In some endgame situations, a player must actually lose a tempo to make progress. For example, when the two kings stand in opposition (a form of zugzwang), the player to move is often at a disadvantage because they must move. The player to move may be able to triangulate in order to lose a tempo and return to the same position but with the opponent to move (and put them in zugzwang). Kings, queens, bishops, and rooks can lose a tempo; a knight cannot.

Timofeev vs. Inarkiev, 2008

Position: d8 white rook, f4 white king, g4 black bishop, h4 black king

Position after 117.Rd8, threatening 118.Rh8+. Black resigned.
Timofeev vs. Inarkiev, analysis

Position: h8 white rook, h7 black cross, h6 black cross, h5 black bishop, f4 white king, h4 black king

Analysis position after 117...Be2 118.Rh8+ Bh5. Now 119.Rh7 (or 119.Rh6) is a tempo move.

In the position from Artyom Timofeev–Ernesto Inarkiev, 2008, Black resigned because White will win with a tempo move. (Timofeev won the 2008 Moscow Open with this game.) White is threatening 118.Rh8+. If Black moves his king on move 117, White wins the bishop with 118.Rh8+, which results in a position that has an elementary checkmate. If Black moves 117...Bh5, then 118.Rh8 and Black is in zugzwang and loses. So Black must move 117...Be2 to avoid immediately getting into a lost position. But then will come 118.Rh8+ Bh5 and now White makes a tempo move with 119.Rh7 (or 119.Rh6), maintaining the pin on the bishop, making it Black's turn to move, and Black must lose the bishop.

== Spare tempo ==
Burgess

Position: f7 black pawn, f6 black circle, h6 black pawn, a5 white king, b5 black pawn, g5 black pawn, b4 white pawn, c4 black king, g4 white pawn, f3 white circle, h3 white circle, f2 white pawn, h2 white pawn

White to move has two spare tempi; Black has only one.

A spare tempo in an endgame arises when a player has a pawn move that does not essentially change the position but loses a tempo to put the opponent in zugzwang. In this example, if only the queenside pieces were considered, it would be an instance of full-point reciprocal zugzwang – the player to move would lose. In the full position, White has two spare tempi (f2-pawn to square f3 and h2-pawn to square h3) whereas Black has only one (f7-pawn to square f6), so White has a spare tempo. By using these moves White can force Black into a fatal zugzwang:

1. h3 f6
2. f3

and any move Black makes will lose.

If the black pawn had been on h7 instead of h6, White and Black would have an equal number of spare tempi, so the player to move would lose.

== Reserve tempo ==
Nunn vs. Bischoff

Position: d7 black king, f7 black pawn, a6 black pawn, g6 black pawn, c5 white pawn, d5 black pawn, g5 white pawn, a4 white circle, f4 white pawn, a3 white circle, c3 white king, a2 white pawn

Black to move loses because of the reserve tempo of the white pawn on the a-file.

A pawn may have a reserve tempo, mainly in endgames involving only kings and pawns. This is especially true of a pawn on the second rank, where it has the option of moving one or two squares. Pawn moves held in reserve may be used to win a game.

In this position from a 1986 game between John Nunn and Klaus Bischoff, Black resigned because he must lose his pawn on the d-file because White has a reserve tempo with his a-pawn. For example, after

39... Kc6
40. Kd4 a5
41. a4

or

39... Kc7
40. Kd4 Kc6
41. a3 a5
42. a4

Black must now abandon the d5-pawn (or first move and lose his f7-pawn). White is able to place Black in zugzwang because he has the option of moving the a2-pawn either one or two squares.

== See also ==
- Initiative
- Sente
- Triangulation
- Zugzwang
