= Opposition (chess) =

In chess, when two kings face each other with only one square between them

In chess, opposition (or direct opposition) is a situation in which both kings are two squares apart on the same rank or file. Since kings cannot move adjacent to each other, each king prevents the other's advance, creating a mutual blockade. In this situation, the player not having to move is said to have the opposition. It is a special type of zugzwang and most often occurs in endgames with only kings and pawns. The side with the move may have to move their king away, potentially allowing the opposing king access to important squares. Taking the opposition is a means to an end, normally to force the opponent's king to move to a weaker position, and is not always the best thing to do.

There are extensions of direct opposition, such as diagonal opposition and distant opposition, which can be conducive to reaching direct opposition. All three types may be referred to simply as opposition if the type is unambiguous in context.

== Direct opposition ==
Direct opposition is a position in which the kings are on the same rank or file and are separated by one square. When the term opposition is used, it normally refers to direct opposition.

Position: b7 black king, b5 white king, b4 white pawn

Direct opposition. If Black is to move, White has the opposition and wins. If White is to move, Black has the opposition and draws.

In this diagram, the player whose turn it is not to move has the opposition. If it is Black's turn to move, White has the opposition and wins. (See King and pawn versus king endgame.) If it were White's turn to move, Black would have the opposition and the position would be a draw.

In order to ensure correct play in situations like in the diagram, it may be helpful to remember that each time the pawn steps forward, it must be without giving check. If the pawn checks the opponent's king, the opposition will be lost and the game drawn.

=== Example ===
Gligorić vs. Fischer, 1959

Position: c8 black king, a6 black circle, b6 black circle, c6 black circle, b4 white pawn, c4 white king

Position after 57.Kc4. Marked squares are key squares. Black draws.

In the game Svetozar Gligorić–Bobby Fischer, 1959, Black can draw by keeping the white king from getting to any of the key squares (marked by dots). This is accomplished by not allowing White to get the opposition, and seizing the opposition if the white king advances.

57... Kb8!

This waiting move is the only move to draw. (In the actual game the players agreed to a draw at this point.) Other moves allow White to get the opposition and then get to a key square. If the white king gets to a key square, White wins. For example 57...Kb7? 58.Kb5, then the black king moves and the white king gets to a key square and then wins by forcing promotion of the pawn.

58. Kc5 Kc7
59. Kb5 Kb7
60. Ka5 Ka7

and Black draws. In this sequence, any other moves by Black lose.

== Diagonal opposition ==
Position: e7 black king, g7 black pawn, g6 white pawn, e5 white king, f5 white pawn

Black to move. White has direct opposition, but it is not sufficient to win; it must be converted to diagonal opposition first.

Position: f8 black king, g7 black pawn, d6 white king, g6 white pawn, f5 white pawn

Black to move, White has diagonal opposition.

Opposition along a diagonal is called diagonal opposition. Sometimes diagonal opposition is used to achieve direct opposition. An example is the position in the first diagram, with Black to move. White has the direct opposition in this position, but it does him no good because his king cannot attack the black pawn after the black king moves away. White needs to achieve direct opposition closer to the pawn.

1... Kf8 2. Kd6

and White has the diagonal opposition (second diagram).

2... Ke8 3. Ke6

White now has direct opposition on a useful square, and White wins:

3... Kf8 4. Kd7 Kg8 5. Ke7 Kh8 6. f6 gxf6 7. Kf7

7.Kxf6 also wins for White.

== Distant opposition ==
from Capablanca

Position: e8 black king, b5 black pawn, h5 black pawn, b4 white pawn, h4 white pawn, e2 black cross, e1 white king

White takes the distant opposition with 1.Ke2.

Distant opposition is a position in which the kings are on the same rank or file but are separated by more than one square. If there are an odd number of squares between the kings, the player not having the move has the (distant) opposition. As with diagonal opposition, it is often converted to direct opposition, as in the diagram:

1. Ke2

White takes the distant opposition.

1... Ke7 2. Ke3 Ke6 3. Ke4

Taking the direct opposition; and now Black must step aside.

3... Kd6

If 3...Kf6 then White plays the corresponding 4.Kf4!

4. Kd4!

4.Kf5 would lead to both pawns queening.

4... Kc6

4...Ke6 5.Kc5 and White is way ahead in the queening race.

5. Ke5

and White has a choice of which pawn he wins, using the created passed pawn as an outside passed pawn unless he can promote it directly.

Black can be tricky and try:

1... Kf8

The point is if 2.Ke3 then 2...Ke7 and now Black has the distant opposition and draws. Similarly, if 2.Kf3 then 2...Kf7. White must remember that the aim of the opposition is to penetrate, so to step sideways and forward with ...

2. Kd3! Ke7

Otherwise White will be able to penetrate with Kc5, and will win the race to queen.

3. Ke3!

White again has the distant opposition, transposing into the main line.

=== Teaching tool ===
Ortvin Sarapu

Position: g8 black king, f1 white rook, g1 white king

Teaching tool: White is to checkmate and move the rook only once.

This position is very similar to the previous position. White is to checkmate, moving the rook only once in the process. The main line is:

1. Kg2

Taking the distant opposition.

1... Kg7 2. Kg3 Kg6 3. Kg4 Kh6

Since the black king has been forced to step aside to the h-file, White can now penetrate on the f-file.

4. Kf5! Kg7

If 4...Kh5 then 5.Rh1#.

5. Kg5 Kh7 6. Kf6 Kg8

If 6...Kh8 then 7.Kf7 Kh7 8.Rh1#.

7. Kg6 Kh8 8. Rf8#

Again, Black can be tricky and try:

1... Kh8 2. Kf3!

Again, White penetrates. If 2.Kg3 then 2...Kg7 3.Kh3 Kh7 gives Black the distant opposition.

2... Kg7

If 2...Kh7 then 3.Kf4!

3. Kg3 etc.

== Purpose ==
Position: b6 black circle, e6 black king, c5 black circle, c4 white pawn, d4 white king, e4 black cross

The white king should simply march to key squares (c5 and then b6); taking the opposition with 1.Ke4 only draws.

Yuri Averbakh pointed out that the opposition is a means to an end; the end is penetration to a key square. This can be a square in front of a pawn, so the king can lead it to the queening square, or into a critical zone to win an enemy blocked pawn.

In the diagram, White should play

1. Kc5

Taking the opposition by 1.Ke4? merely draws.

Position: e8 black king, d6 white king, d5 white pawn

White to move

This second position shows a simpler example. If White takes the opposition with 1.Ke6 he makes no progress. The winning move is

1. Kc7

(See King and pawn versus king endgame.)

== See also ==
- Corresponding squares
- Triangulation (chess)
- Zugzwang
