= Chess middlegame =

Portion of a chess game between the opening and endgame

Position: a8 black rook, d8 black queen, h8 black king, a7 black pawn, b7 black knight, e7 black bishop, f7 black pawn, g7 black rook, h7 black pawn, e6 black pawn, f6 white knight, g6 black pawn, c5 black pawn, e5 white pawn, f5 black bishop, g5 white queen, d4 black pawn, f4 white pawn, f3 white knight, g3 white rook, a2 white pawn, b2 white pawn, c2 white pawn, g2 white pawn, h2 white pawn, c1 white bishop, f1 white rook, g1 white king

Middlegame position from the game Joseph Blackburne–Siegbert Tarrasch, Breslau, 1889, after 26.Qg5. Black played 26...Nd6.

The middlegame is the portion of a chess game between the opening and the endgame. It is generally considered to begin when each player has completed the development of all or most of their pieces and brought their king to relative safety, and it is generally considered to end when only a few pieces remain on the board. However, there is no clear line between the opening and middlegame or between the middlegame and endgame. At master level, the opening analysis may go well into the middlegame; likewise, the middlegame blends into the endgame.

Theory on the middlegame is less developed than the opening or endgames. Since middlegame positions are unique from game to game, memorization of theoretical variations is not possible as it is in the opening. Likewise, there are usually too many pieces on the board for theoretical positions to be completely analyzed as can be done in the simpler endgames.

== Defining the middlegame ==
Views vary on when the opening ends and the middlegame begins. In general, the opening is defined as ending when the development of pieces is mostly complete.

Similarly, there are differing opinions and criteria for when the middlegame ends and the endgame begins (see the start of the endgame). Factors such as control of the center are less important in the endgame than the middlegame. In endgames the number of pieces and pawns is much reduced, though even after queens are traded, it is possible to have a middlegame without queens. The endgame is often said to begin when the kings can safely play an active role.

== Aims of the middlegame ==
The Middle Game in Chess by Reuben Fine lists three major factors in the middlegame: king safety, force (material), and mobility, although not all of these factors are of equal importance. If king safety is a serious issue, a well-executed attack on the king can render other considerations, including material advantages, irrelevant. Material is another important consideration: Fine notes that—if all other things are equal—any material advantage will usually be decisive. According to Fine, a material advantage will usually not give a direct mating attack unless the advantage is very large (a rook or more); rather, it can be used as a means of gaining more material and a decisive endgame advantage. To gain mobility is to ensure that the pieces have a wide scope of action and targets to focus on. The concept is largely strategic in nature, and involves such concepts as space, pawn weaknesses (since weak pawns can compel pieces to defensive duties, reducing their mobility), and securing outposts for the pieces.

The strategy required for middlegame play varies considerably. Some middlegame positions feature closed centres featuring maneuvering behind the lines, while other middlegames are wide open, where both players attempt to gain the initiative. Dan Heisman noted three features which can seriously alter the way the middlegame is played.

First, if the kings are castled on opposite wings, and queens remain on the board, the position can be very violent, with both players aiming to assault the enemy king. Material considerations are often secondary to pursuing the attack, and it can even be advantageous to lose pawns in front of the enemy king in order to open up lines for the rooks and queen.

Second, positions where the pawn structure is static and locked can also feature mutual attacks, since players often elect to play on the side where they have more space (playing on the side of the board in which their pawns are pointing). Time is often less of a concern in such middlegames, allowing lengthy maneuvers. Players attempt to strengthen their positions and weaken their opponent's. Both players need to be on the lookout for pawn breaks, and the possibility of taking advantage of the open files which may arise from them.

Third, if one player has an overwhelming material advantage and is clearly winning, the stronger player can usually afford to violate several of the normal middlegame principles in order to trade down to an endgame. For example, trading queens even at the cost of a ruined pawn structure may be a viable option.

== Transition to the endgame ==
Not all games reach the endgame, since an attack on the king, or a combination leading to large material gains can end the game while it is still in the middlegame. At other times, an advantage needs to be pursued in the endgame, and learning how to make favorable exchanges leading to a favorable endgame is an important skill.

The last thing that happens in the middlegame is the setup for endgame. Since many endgames involve the promotion of a pawn, it is usually good to keep that in mind when making trades during the middlegame. For example, World Champion Max Euwe considered a preponderance of pawns on the queenside (queenside majority) an advantage because this might be used to create a passed pawn.

== See also ==
- Glossary of chess
- Chess strategy
- Chess tactics
- Chess piece relative value
- Pawn structure

== Reference works ==
=== Classical middlegame textbooks ===
Works mostly written before 1970.

- Euwe, Max and H. Kramer 1964; 1994. The Middlegame. 2 vols: McKay; Hays. ISBN 978-1-880673-95-9
- Fine, Reuben [1952] 2003. The Middlegame in Chess. McKay; Random House. ISBN 0-8129-3484-9
- Keres, Paul; Kotov, Alexander (1964). The Art of the Middle Game. Penguin Books.
- Nimzowitsch, Aron [1927] 1987. My system. B.T Batsford Ltd. ISBN 978-0-7134-5655-4
- Pachman, Ludek [1963] 1975/78. Complete chess strategy. Doubleday. 3 vols from the first edition of 2 vols. ISBN 978-0-346-12321-2; ISBN 978-1-880673-96-6; ISBN 978-0-679-13252-3.
- Tarrasch, Siegbert [1895] 1999. Three hundred chess games. Hays. ISBN 978-1-880673-18-8
- Znosko-Borovsky, Eugene (1980) [1938]. The Middle Game in Chess. Dover. ISBN 0-486-23931-4.

=== Modern texts ===
- Averbakh, Yuri 1996. Chess Middlegames: essential knowledge. Cadogan, ISBN 1-85744-125-7
- Dvoretsky, Mark & Yusupov, Artur 1996. Positional play. Batsford, London. ISBN 0-7134-7879-9
- Silman, Jeremy 1998. The complete book of chess strategy. Siles Press. ISBN 978-1-890085-01-8.
- Sokolov, Ivan (2009). Winning Chess Middlegames. New In Chess. ISBN 978-90-5691-264-2.
- Suetin, Alexey (1976). A contemporary approach to the Middle Game. Hippocrene Books. ISBN 978-0-7134-3123-0.
- Tisdall, Jonathan 1997. Improve your chess now. Everyman, London. ISBN 978-1-85744-156-7
- Watson, John 1998. Secrets of modern chess strategy: advances since Nimzowitsch. Gambit London. ISBN 1-901983-07-2
- Watson, John. 2003. Chess strategy in action. Gambit, London. ISBN 1-901983-69-2
