= List of chess games =

Chronological list of notable chess games

This is a list of notable chess games sorted chronologically.

== Pre-1800 ==
- 1475: Francesc de Castellví vs Narcís de Vinyoles, Valencia 1475. The first documented chess game played with the modern queen and bishop moves; the moves were described in the poem Scachs d'amor.
- 1623: Gioachino Greco vs NN, London 1623. Greco mates on the eighth move with a queen sacrifice.
- 1788: Thomas Bowdler vs Henry Seymour Conway, London. Bowdler offers the first example of a famous double rook sacrifice.
- 1790: Andrew Smith vs François-André Danican Philidor, London. Philidor, who was quoted as saying "Pawns are the soul of chess", demonstrates the power of a superior pawn formation.

== 1800s ==
- 1834: Louis Charles Mahe De La Bourdonnais vs Alexander McDonnell, Match 4, Round 4, London. Reuben Fine in The World's Great Chess Games described it as the first great immortal game of chess. McDonnell sacrifices his queen for two minor pieces.
- 1834: McDonnell vs La Bourdonnais, Match 4, Game 16, London. Perhaps the most famous win of their matches (considered an unofficial world championship), La Bourdonnais shows how a rolling pawn mass can overwhelm all of his opponent's major pieces.
- 1843: Pierre de Saint Amant vs Howard Staunton, 5th Match Game, Paris. Saint-Amant resigns in this unofficial world championship match game with Staunton, in which Staunton remarked, "The latter portion of this game is conducted with remarkable skill by both parties."
- 1844: Alexander Hoffmann vs Alexander Petrov, Warsaw. Petrov wins with a queen sacrifice and a king hunt, in a game known as "Petrov's Immortal".
- 1851: Adolf Anderssen vs Lionel Kieseritzky, London. Known as the "Immortal Game". Kieseritzky neglects his development and Anderssen sacrifices his light-squared bishop, both rooks, and finally his queen for a win.
- 1852: Adolf Anderssen vs Jean Dufresne, Berlin. Known as the "Evergreen Game". Anderssen mates with what Savielly Tartakower termed "[a] combination second to none in the literature of the game."
- 1857: Louis Paulsen vs Paul Morphy, New York. Morphy gains an advantage in development and transforms it into a powerful kingside attack with a queen sacrifice.
- 1857: John William Schulten vs Paul Morphy, New York. In a casual game played after the conclusion of the first American Chess Congress, Morphy pins down Schulten's king in the middle and proceeds to checkmate it with forceful play.
- 1858: Paul Morphy vs Duke of Brunswick and Count Isouard, Paris. Known as the "Opera Game". Morphy shows the virtue of quick development and wins by sacrificing much material, mating on the 17th move with his last two pieces.
- 1862: Wilhelm Steinitz vs Augustus Mongredien, London. Steinitz won the tournament's brilliancy prize for this game.
- 1872: Carl Hamppe vs Philipp Meitner, Vienna. Known as the "Immortal Draw" between Hamppe and Meitner, involving a queen sacrifice.
- 1874: Viktor Knorre vs Mikhail Chigorin, St. Petersburg. Knorre's premature castling on the kingside combined with an ineffective pin allows Chigorin to strike back with a violent counterattack culminating in a brilliant queen sacrifice and subsequent checkmate.
- 1883: Johannes Zukertort vs Joseph Henry Blackburne, London. Known as "Zukertort's Immortal", Zukertort leaves his queen open to capture where it cannot be taken except by allowing checkmate.
- 1889: Emanuel Lasker vs Johann Hermann Bauer, Amsterdam. This game between Lasker and Bauer was the first famous example of the double bishop sacrifice.
- 1895: Harry Nelson Pillsbury vs Siegbert Tarrasch, Hastings. Pillsbury's kingside attack breaks through by a single tempo against the strong Tarrasch's queenside play.
- 1895: Wilhelm Steinitz vs von Bardeleben, Hastings. This game is famous for its ten-move mating combination in the final position, which Steinitz demonstrated after the game. The peculiar circumstances of the conclusion of this game have been the subject of scrutiny.
- 1895: Harry Nelson Pillsbury vs Isidor Gunsberg, Hastings. In the final round of this prestigious tournament, Pillsbury secures overall victory by triumphing in an instructive endgame.
- 1896: Harry Nelson Pillsbury vs Emanuel Lasker, Saint Petersburg. Lasker won the brilliancy prize for this game by exposing Pillsbury's king with the sacrifice of both rooks on the same square.

== 1900–1924 ==
- 1904: Emanuel Lasker vs William Ewart Napier, Cambridge Springs. Both players show great ingenuity. After a complicated web of tactics, Lasker simplifies into a winning endgame.
- 1907: Gersz Rotlewi vs Akiba Rubinstein, Lodz. Rubinstein defeats Rotlewi with one of the most famous combinations ever played.
- 1909: Akiba Rubinstein vs Emanuel Lasker, Saint Petersburg. Rubinstein's brilliant play culminates in 18.Qc1!!, subsequently forcing Lasker to enter a rook endgame down a pawn that Rubinstein wins in masterly fashion.
- 1912: Stepan Levitsky vs Frank Marshall, Breslau. Marshall's final move against Levitsky places his queen en prise in three different ways. The spectators are said to have showered the board with gold coins.
- 1912: Edward Lasker vs Sir George Thomas, London. With a queen sacrifice, Edward Lasker (third cousin twice removed of the more well-known Emanuel Lasker) exposes Thomas' king and with a series of checks drives it all the way to the other side of the board before checkmating with an advance of his king.
- 1914: Emanuel Lasker vs José Raúl Capablanca, St Petersburg. Lasker defeats Capablanca in a positional game where his winning strategy seemed to flow right from the opening to the end. Capablanca, himself renowned as a master of simple positions, was sufficiently rattled to lose in the next round as well, handing the tournament victory to Lasker.
- 1918: Akiba Rubinstein vs Milan Vidmar, Berlin. Vidmar surprises Rubinstein by playing the Budapest Gambit, leading to a brilliant victory.
- 1918: José Raúl Capablanca vs Frank Marshall, New York. In the main line of the Ruy Lopez, Marshall surprises Capablanca with a bold pawn sacrifice. Capablanca accepts the challenge, fully aware of the fierce attack he is about to face.
- 1920: Edwin Ziegler Adams vs Carlos Torre Repetto, New Orleans. Likely composed by Torre as a tribute to his benefactor E. Z. Adams, this game features the most famous back-rank mate combination in chess literature, involving six consecutive offers of the queen.
- 1922: Alexander Alekhine vs Efim Bogoljubow, Pistyan. This game between Alekhine and Bogoljubow is referred to in the famous novella The Royal Game by Stefan Zweig. In the story, the position after 38.d6 is reproduced in a game between the fictional world chess champion as White and a group of outmatched amateur players who are on the verge of promoting their c-pawn as Black, when an unknown spectator frantically intervenes and explains how White will beat them in 9−10 moves after 38...c1=Q 39.Bxc1 Nxc1 40.d7. He instead proposes 38...Kh7, correctly predicting that 39.h4 will follow, and after 39...Rc4 he manoeuvres the game for 7−8 more moves until the world champion settles for a draw.
- 1922: Efim Bogoljubow vs Alexander Alekhine, Hastings. Irving Chernev called this the greatest game of chess ever played, adding: "Alekhine's subtle strategy involves manoeuvres which encompass the entire chessboard as a battlefield. There are exciting plots and counterplots. There are fascinating combinations and brilliant sacrifices of Queens and Rooks. There are two remarkable promotions of Pawns and a third in the offing, before White decides to capitulate."
- 1923: Friedrich Sämisch vs Aron Nimzowitsch, Copenhagen. Known as the "Immortal Zugzwang Game", Nimzowitsch ties his opponent down as Sämisch steadily finds himself with fewer and fewer moves left to make.
- 1924: Richard Réti vs José Raúl Capablanca, New York. The game that ended Capablanca's eight-year run without a single loss in tournament play.
- 1924: José Raúl Capablanca vs Savielly Tartakower, New York. One of the most famous and instructive endgames ever played, Capablanca sacrifices two pawns with check to support his passed pawn.

== 1925–1949 ==
- 1925: Richard Réti vs Alexander Alekhine, Baden-Baden. Alekhine initiates a stunning combination and foresees the final position resulting more than 15 moves later.
- 1930: Glucksberg vs Miguel Najdorf, Warsaw. Known as the "Polish Immortal". Black sacrifices all four minor pieces for victory.
- 1932: Salo Flohr vs Max Euwe. The first game of a match held in the Netherlands (Amsterdam, The Hague, Rotterdam). A textbook example of a minority attack.
- c. 1933: Albert Einstein vs J. Robert Oppenheimer. A recorded game in playbooks, said to have been played between physicists Albert Einstein (or his son Hans Albert Einstein) and J. Robert Oppenheimer. No conclusive evidence supports the historical accuracy of this game.
- 1934: Esteban Canal vs NN, Budapest. Known as the "Peruvian Immortal". Peruvian master Canal demolishes his amateur opponent with the sacrifice of two rooks and a queen.
- 1935: Max Euwe vs Alexander Alekhine, 26th Match Game, Zandvoort. This decisive game from the 1935 match for the world championship was dubbed 'The Pearl of Zandvoort' by Tartakower.
- 1938: Mikhail Botvinnik vs José Raúl Capablanca, Rotterdam. In this game from the AVRO 1938 tournament, future world champion Botvinnik obtains a strong initiative against Capablanca and brings the victory home with a long combination.
- 1938: Frank Parr vs George Wheatcroft, London. Irving Chernev and Fred Reinfeld described this as "one of the greatest combinative games on record".
- 1943: B Molinari vs Luis Roux Cabral, Montevideo. Known as the "Uruguayan Immortal". This game from the 1943 Uruguayan Chess Championship sees Cabral sacrifice the exchange twice, followed by sacrifices of two minor pieces. After 33 moves, all three of his remaining pieces are en prise, but his opponent cannot stop checkmate.
- 1946: Yuri Gusev vs E Auerbach, Chelyabinsk. Known as "Gusev's Immortal". This game was contested between relatively obscure players Gusev and Auerbach (not to be confused with late centenarian grandmaster and theoretician Yuri Averbakh) in an equally obscure minor tournament. National Master Sam Copeland ranked it the second-best game of the 1940s. Grandmaster Simon Williams called the queen sacrifice in this game one of the most beautiful ideas he had ever seen.

== 1950s ==
- 1953: Efim Geller vs Max Euwe, Zurich. Geller's attack seems to be sweeping Euwe off the board, but the former World Champion has everything under control, uncorking an amazing sacrifice on move 22 to begin a counterattack that wins the game in only four more moves.
- 1954: Mikhail Botvinnik vs Vasily Smyslov, 14th Match Game, Moscow. Smyslov sacrifices his queen for three minor pieces and coordinates them superbly to force Botvinnik's capitulation.
- 1956: Donald Byrne vs Bobby Fischer, New York. Known as the "Game of the Century". Byrne makes a seemingly minor mistake on move 11, losing a tempo by moving the same piece twice. Future world champion Fischer uses accurate sacrificial play, culminating in a queen sacrifice, to achieve a winning material advantage—a rook and two bishops for a queen—and coordinates them to force checkmate. Fischer was 13 years old; his opponent was 26.
- 1957: Bogdan Śliwa vs David Bronstein, Gotha. Known as the "Immortal Losing Game". Bronstein has a lost game, but sets some elegant traps in attempting to snatch victory from the jaws of defeat.
- 1958: Lev Polugaevsky vs Rashid Nezhmetdinov, Sochi. In one of the most celebrated games of all time, Nezhmetdinov sacrifices his queen on move 24 and goes on to win the game with a king hunt.
- 1959: Mikhail Tal vs Vasily Smyslov, Bled. Tal initiates complications early and obtains a strong attack. Smyslov defends well, but eventually stumbles with one erroneous move, and Tal delivers the winning tactical blow.
- 1959: Bobby Fischer vs Tigran Petrosian, Zagreb. The only prominent game in which four queens were on board for as many as seven moves. The game ended with a draw by agreement.

== 1960s ==
- 1960: Boris Spassky vs David Bronstein, Leningrad, Known as the "Blue Bird Game". Spassky plays the King's Gambit and defeats Bronstein with a sacrificial attack.
- 1960: Mikhail Tal vs Mikhail Botvinnik, 1st Match Game, Moscow. Tal's critics said his daring, complicated style would fail against the ironclad logic of Botvinnik, known as the father of Soviet chess, but it succeeded and Tal became the youngest World Champion ever.
- 1961: Milunka Lazarević vs Nona Gaprindashvili, Candidates Tournament, Vrnjacka Banja. On her way to a 16-year reign as Women's World Champion, Gaprindashvili constructs a mating net with her king and queen.
- 1962: Eduard Gufeld vs Lubomir Kavalek, Marianske Lazne. Kavalek sacrifices a piece, then one exchange, then the other exchange to push his avalanche of pawns down the board. By the end of the game, he has lost all seven of his pieces but kept all eight of his pawns, which roll over Gufeld's remaining rook and three pawns.
- 1963: Robert Byrne vs Bobby Fischer, New York. Future world champion Fischer executes a deep sacrificial attack to win in this miniature. Many of the players in the press room thought Fischer's position was hopeless and were surprised when they heard Byrne had resigned.
- 1964: Lajos Portisch vs Mikhail Tal, Amsterdam Interzonal. One of Tal's most famous games, in which he over-presses and finds himself a rook down in a lost position, but keeps setting problems until Portisch makes a mistake and allows the Magician from Riga to escape with a draw.
- 1965: Efim Geller vs Vasily Smyslov, 5th Match Game, Moscow. Though he never managed to play for the World Championship, Efim Geller had a lifetime plus score in over 200 games against world champions, here crushing Smyslov with a queen sacrifice that the former champion couldn't accept.
- 1966: Tigran Petrosian vs Boris Spassky, 10th Match Game, Moscow. Petrosian, the master of the exchange sacrifice, performs two in one game with the World Championship on the line.
- 1967: Bobby Fischer vs Leonid Stein, Sousse Interzonal. Fischer is in top form, leading the tournament and winning this slugfest with a three-time Soviet champion, but then abruptly withdraws over a scheduling dispute, putting his World Championship aspirations on hold for three years.
- 1968: Frank Poole vs HAL 9000. A fictional game from the movie 2001: A Space Odyssey, based on a tournament game between A. Roesch and Willi Schlage, Hamburg 1910. Astronaut Dr. Frank Poole plays against the supercomputer HAL 9000. The computer executes a strong sacrificial attack and wins in 15 moves.
- 1969: Boris Spassky vs Tigran Petrosian, 19th Match Game, Moscow. Having fought his way to a World Championship rematch with Petrosian, Spassky wins the match decisively.

== 1970s ==
- 1970: Bent Larsen vs Boris Spassky, Belgrade. Spassky finds an immediate punishment for Larsen's opening experiments, sacrificing a knight and a rook to create a passed pawn, winning the game in just 17 moves.
- 1971: Bruce Harper vs Robert Zuk, Burnaby. Known as the "Tomb Game". Zuk exploits two pins to drive Harper's pieces into a corner and toward a position where Harper's only legal move will help Zuk checkmate him.
- 1972: Bobby Fischer vs Boris Spassky, 6th Match Game, Reykjavik. The sixth game of their highly publicized world championship match, in which Fischer surprises by opening with 1.c4 instead of his favorite 1.e4. Spassky joined the audience in applauding Fischer's win and called it the best game of the World Chess Championship 1972.
- 1972: Boris Spassky vs Bobby Fischer, 11th Match Game, Reykjavik. The eleventh game of their highly publicized world championship match, in which Spassky destroys Fischer's Najdorf Variation. This game gave Fischer his only ever loss in the Poisoned Pawn variation of the Najdorf.
- 1972: Boris Spassky vs Bobby Fischer, 13th Match Game, Reykjavik. The thirteenth game of their highly publicized world championship match, in which Fischer wins a complex contest over Spassky.
- 1973: David Bronstein vs Ljubomir Ljubojević, Petropolis Interzonal. Bronstein, who had played a match for the world championship before his grandmaster opponent could walk, turns back the clock, sacrifices both rooks, and wins.
- 1974: Anatoly Karpov vs Boris Spassky, 9th Match Game, Leningrad. Former World Champion Spassky can't cope with future world champion Karpov's subtle, seemingly effortless positional mastery.
- 1975: Dragojub Minić vs Albin Planinc, Rovinj/Zagreb. A mercurial but ultimately tragic figure, Planinc is remembered for the restless creativity that produced one of the most amazing games of the decade.
- 1976: Smbat Lputian vs Garry Kasparov, Tbilisi. Though not widely published at the time, this explosive victory has come to be regarded as 13-year-old future world champion Garry Kasparov's first flash of true greatness.
- 1977: Stefano Tatai vs Anatoly Karpov, Las Palmas. World Champion Karpov dominated tournament chess in the 1970s with his signature style of elegant positional play crowned by crisp tactics, like in this game where he places his queen en prise to a pawn.
- 1978: Liu Wenzhe vs Jan Hein Donner, Buenos Aires. Known as the "Chinese Immortal". At China's first Olympiad, the little-known Liu defeats the experienced Dutch grandmaster Donner in 20 moves with a spectacular kingside attack.
- 1979: Igor Ivanov vs Anatoly Karpov, Moscow. A literally life-changing game: this victory over the World Champion earned Igor Ivanov the opportunity to play in an international tournament. On the way back, he seized a chance to defect from the USSR and start a new life in Canada.

== 1980s ==
- 1980: Anatoly Karpov vs Tony Miles, European Team Championship, Skara. England's iconoclastic first grandmaster Miles uses a provocative opening to score his most famous win against the world champion.
- 1981: Garry Kasparov vs Viktor Gavrikov, USSR Championship, Frunze. One of future world champion Kasparov's dynamic, attacking wins from his first Soviet Championship victory at age 18 that heralded the arrival of a new contender for the World Chess Championship.
- 1982: Lubomir Kavalek vs Garry Kasparov, Bugojno. By 1982, Kasparov was already ranked #2 in the world and was dominating the world's best players. He would win 15 consecutive tournaments between 1981 and 1990.
- 1983: Anatoly Karpov vs Efim Geller, USSR Championship, Moscow. Although Garry Kasparov's star was rising in the early 1980s, world champion Karpov was still in top form, here using a queen sacrifice to checkmate veteran grandmaster Geller on the way to his second Soviet Championship title.
- 1984: Lajos Portisch vs József Pintér, Hungarian Championship, Budapest. Pintér plays the game of his life against his famous opponent, sacrificing a piece in a queenless middlegame to draw Portisch's king into deadly crossfire.
- 1985: Anatoly Karpov vs Garry Kasparov, 16th Match Game, Moscow. Kasparov employs a daring gambit and obtains a dominating position for his knight, stifling Karpov's forces and finishing off with a mating attack.
- 1985: Anatoly Karpov vs Garry Kasparov, 24th Match Game, Moscow. Needing a win to retain his title, Karpov builds up an attack but falls victim to a blitz counteroffensive that makes Kasparov the 13th World Chess Champion.
- 1986: Garry Kasparov vs Anatoly Karpov, 16th Match Game, Leningrad. The most spectacular game of their third world championship match hangs in the balance until Kasparov's diabolical 37th move blows Karpov's defence away.
- 1987: Garry Kasparov vs Anatoly Karpov, 24th Match Game, Seville. Trailing by a point before the final game of their fourth World Championship match, Kasparov surprises Karpov by beginning quietly in Karpov's own style. With Karpov running low on time, Kasparov ratchets up the tension by sacrificing a pawn for an attack. Karpov fails to find the best defence and is finally forced to resign, leaving Kasparov the champion for another three years.
- 1988: Carsten Høi vs Boris Gulko, Thessaloniki Olympiad. Representing Denmark at the biennial Chess Olympiad, Høi fulfills the dream of every unknown player by crushing a former Soviet and future US Champion with a beautiful mating attack.
- 1989: Jeroen Piket vs Garry Kasparov, Tilburg. A typically devastating performance by Kasparov, whose dominance of super-tournaments in 1989 increased his rating to 2800, the first to reach that number.

== 1990s ==
- 1990: Anatoly Karpov vs Garry Kasparov, World Chess Championship, Lyon, 23rd Match Game. The 5th world championship match between the two dominant players of the 1980s ends with Karpov winning the last decisive game but Kasparov winning the match to remain world champion.
- 1991: Vasyl Ivanchuk vs Artur Yusupov, Brussels, 9th Match Game. Needing a win in tiebreaks, Yusupov sacrifices his knight in a reckless quest for the attack and breaks through after inaccuracies by Ivanchuk. In 1996, a jury of grandmasters and readers, voting in the Chess Informant, chose this game as the best game played in the years 1966–96.
- 1992: Mikhail Tal vs Joël Lautier, Barcelona. In his final tournament before his death at age 55, the Magician from Riga produces one last masterpiece against a grandmaster from the next generation.
- 1992: Vasyl Ivanchuk vs Viswanathan Anand, Linares, 1st Match Game. Anand breaks all principles of positional chess by getting doubled pawns and trading his good bishop, only to reveal the deep idea later in the game, managing to create 2 passed pawns and eventually winning.
- 1993: Nigel Short vs Garry Kasparov, PCA World Championship, London, 8th Match Game. Although the match was one-sided, the games were hard-fought. In this game, Short exposes Kasparov's king with a shower of sacrifices but can't land the knockout blow.
- 1994: Alexey Shirov vs Judit Polgár, Buenos Aires. The attacking prowess of the strongest woman chess player of all time is on full display as she rips Shirov's position apart with her pawns and routs his army with her knights.
- 1995: Roberto Cifuentes vs Vadim Zvjaginsev, Wijk aan Zee. Known as the "Pearl of Wijk aan Zee". Zvjaginsev wins with a series of sacrifices that force Cifuentes' king up to the 6th rank.
- 1995: Veselin Topalov vs Vladimir Kramnik, Belgrade. Foreshadowing their bitter rivalry a decade later, two future World Champions refuse to draw and throw everything at each other until only one is left standing.
- 1996: Deep Blue versus Garry Kasparov, Game 1. The first game in which a chess-playing computer defeated a reigning world champion using classical time controls.
- 1997: Deep Blue versus Garry Kasparov, Game 6. The last game of the 1997 rematch. Deep Blue won, making it the first computer to defeat a world champion in a match.
- 1998: Veselin Topalov vs Alexey Shirov, Linares. Though known for his attacking play, Shirov produces "the best move of all time" on move 47 of a quiet endgame to score a seemingly impossible win. Tim Krabbé ranked Shirov's 47...Bh3 as the second-greatest move in chess history, behind only Boris Spassky's 16...Nc6 against Yuri Averbakh in 1956.
- 1999: Garry Kasparov vs Veselin Topalov, Wijk aan Zee. Known as "Kasparov's Immortal". This game features a rook sacrifice with a sacrificial combination lasting over 15 moves. This game is one of the most commented chess games ever, with extensive press coverage.
- 1999: Garry Kasparov vs The World. Reigning world champion Kasparov defeated a group of players in consultation who decided moves by vote. This group included 50,000 individuals from more than 75 countries.

== 2000s ==
- 2000: Garry Kasparov vs Vladimir Kramnik, Classical World Chess Championship, 3rd Match Game, London. Kramnik revives the Berlin Defence, which had fallen out of favor, and in the most popular variation of which the queens are exchanged on move 8. The queenless endgame is difficult for Kramnik to defend but limits Kasparov's options, and the game ends in draw by agreement.
- 2002: Ruslan Ponomariov vs Vassily Ivanchuk, FIDE World Championship Tournament, Final Match, 5th Game, Moscow. Down a point in the World Championship final, Ivanchuk has a large advantage but can't find a winning continuation. 18-year-old Ponomariov equalizes, counterattacks and wins to take a decisive match lead on his way to becoming the youngest World Champion in history.
- 2004: Vladimir Kramnik vs Peter Leko, Classical World Chess Championship, 14th Match Game, Brissago. Needing only a draw to win the World Championship, Leko plays too passively and pays the price.
- 2005: Viswanathan Anand vs Veselin Topalov, Sofia. Shocking in its complexity, this game finally ended in a hard-fought draw and was called "23rd-century chess" by Vladimir Kramnik.
- 2006: Sergey Karjakin vs Viswanathan Anand, Corus chess tournament, Round 1, Wijk aan Zee. Anand played a brilliant combination against Karjakin, beginning with the sacrifice of a knight, followed by a sacrifice of a bishop, and finally a rook mating with just a rook and a queen.
- 2006: Vladimir Kramnik vs Veselin Topalov, World Chess Championship, 16th Match Game, Elista. After 13 years of a divided world championship, the reunification match comes down to a final tiebreak game.

== 2010s ==
- 2013: Levon Aronian vs Viswanathan Anand, Wijk aan Zee. Known as "Anand's Immortal". In this game, reigning world champion Anand exhibits a combination with a rook sacrifice and two more offered sacrifices to beat Aronian, then ranked No. 3 in the world. ChessBase wrote that "[it] might surely go down as the game of the year", and The New York Times described it as "a game for the ages".
- 2013: Viswanathan Anand vs Magnus Carlsen, World Championship, Game 9, Chennai. Two games down with only three to go in the match, Anand develops a dangerous kingside attack only to make a fatal blunder on move 28. One game later, Carlsen would become the 16th undisputed world champion.
- 2015: Wei Yi vs Lázaro Bruzón, Danzhou. In this game, chess prodigy Wei plays a rook sacrifice that forces Bruzón to take a king walk, after which several quiet moves eventually force Bruzón to concede defeat. This game has been compared to Kasparov's Immortal and the Game of the Century and described as the "21st-century Immortal".
- 2016: Magnus Carlsen vs Sergey Karjakin, World Championship, Game 16, New York. Carlsen retains his title with a beautiful move to end a World Chess Championship match.
- 2017: Bai Jinshi vs Ding Liren, China. Ding creates a stunning tactical crush of young compatriot Bai in just 32 moves with the black pieces, sacrificing his queen and culminating in a spectacular king hunt.
- 2019: Alireza Firouzja vs Karthikeyan Murali, Xingtai. Karthikeyan sacrifices his queen for a knight and a bishop on move 9 in a known position against the prodigy Firouzja, leaving the latter's pieces uncoordinated and without decent squares.

== 2020s ==
- 2021: Magnus Carlsen vs Ian Nepomniachtchi, World Chess Championship, Game 6. Reigning world champion Carlsen exchanged his queen for two rooks to enter into an unbalanced endgame—which was drawn, according to endgame tablebases, after only seven pieces remained on the board—but challenger Nepomniachtchi committed a decisive mistake on move 130 and resigned after Carlsen's 136th move. It was the first decisive classical game in a World Chess Championship in more than five years, ending the longest-ever streak of 19 draws in consecutive world championship classical games, and the 136-move game became the longest in the history of the World Chess Championship.
- 2023: Ian Nepomniachtchi vs Ding Liren, World Chess Championship, Game 18. In a winner-take-all tiebreak game, Ding avoids a draw with a risky self-pin on move 46. Both players make errors in the subsequent play, but Nepomniachtchi makes the last one, as Ding breaks through to become the 17th undisputed World Chess Champion.

== See also ==
- List of chess games between Anand and Kramnik
- List of chess games between Kasparov and Kramnik
