= Immortal Draw =

Chess game played in 1872

Animation of the game

The Immortal Draw is a chess game played in 1872 in Vienna by Carl Hamppe and Philipp Meitner. This game is the main claim to fame of both Hamppe and Meitner, and has been reprinted widely. The variation of the Vienna Game it uses was named the Hamppe–Meitner Variation in honour of the two players. The game was played in the 19th-century Romantic style, in which rapid development and attack were considered the most effective way to win, where many gambits and countergambits were offered (and not accepting them was considered slightly ungentlemanly), and where material was often held in contempt. These games, with their rapid attacks and counterattacks, are often entertaining to review even if some of the moves would no longer be considered best by today's standards.

In the game, Black sacrifices huge amounts of material in an attempted king hunt, but White spectacularly manages to force a draw by perpetual check.

The game itself has often been replayed as a prearranged draw. Its motif of a bishop sacrifice in response to an early knight attack occurs in other lines as well.

== Annotated game ==
White: Carl Hamppe Black: Philipp Meitner Opening: Vienna Game (ECO C25)

1. e4 e5 2. Nc3

The Vienna Game, an opening which Hamppe made major contributions to, giving his name to two variations in the Vienna Gambit.

2... Bc5

2...Nf6 is more usual. The move played is offbeat but playable.

3. Na4?!

Better would be 3.Nf3! d6 4.d4 and White has a slight advantage. The move is premature; although many lines of the Vienna have White trying to obtain the bishop pair with this move, the bishop can still retreat to e7, and the knight is not ideally placed at a4.

3... Bxf2+!?

The quiet 3...Be7 is better and less risky, especially since the move played may in fact lead to a win for White with best play. A bishop sacrifice is commonly seen in reply to an early knight attack in various lines, including this one.

4. Kxf2

Forced.

4... Qh4+ 5. Ke3

Another possibility is 5.g3, where after 5...Qxe4 6.Qe2 Qxh1 7.Qxe5+ Kf8 8.Qxc7 White has a lot of compensation for the sacrificed rook.

5... Qf4+ 6. Kd3 d5 7. Kc3!

Although 7.Qe1 is usually given as a refutation of this line, with 7...dxe4+? 8.Kc3 e3?! 9.Kb3! Be6+ 10.Ka3 where Black has nothing left, Black need not play 7...dxe4+?, and in fact better is 7...Nf6! (Schiller's move) 8.g3! dxe4+ 9.Kc3 Qg4 10.Bh3 Nd5+ 11.Kb3 Nc6!! (11...Qg6!? is unclear) 12.Bxg4! Na5+ 13.Ka3 Nc4+ 14.Kb3 Na5+ with an equal position.

7... Qxe4?

Better would have been 7...d4+! 8.Kb3 (8.Kd3 f5) Qxe4 when White loses the e-pawn for nothing.

8. Kb3?

Better for White than this curious king move would be 8.d4! exd4+ 9.Qxd4!! Qe1+ 10.Bd2!! Qxa1 11.Nf3 (threatening Qxg7 and Bb5+) 11...Qxa2 (an alternative is 11...Nc6!? 12.Qxg7 Be6 13.Nc5! 0-0-0 14.Nxe6 fxe6 15.Qxh8 Qxa2 16.Bg5 where White has a large advantage) 12.Qxg7 Qxa4 13.Qxh8 d4+ 14.Nxd4 Qa5+ 15.Kb3 Qxd2 16.Qxg8+ Ke7 17.Qxc8 Qxd4 18.Bc4! and White has a winning advantage, but still must find several difficult moves.

8... Na6?

Threatening 9...Qb4#, but 8...Nc6 with the same threat would have been better. 8...d4 is also good.

Position: a8 black rook, c8 black bishop, e8 black king, g8 black knight, h8 black rook, a7 black pawn, b7 black pawn, c7 black pawn, f7 black pawn, g7 black pawn, h7 black pawn, a6 black knight, d5 black pawn, e5 black pawn, a4 white knight, e4 black queen, a3 white pawn, b3 white king, b2 white pawn, c2 white pawn, d2 white pawn, g2 white pawn, h2 white pawn, a1 white rook, c1 white bishop, d1 white queen, f1 white bishop, g1 white knight, h1 white rook

Position after 9.a3?

9. a3!? (diagram)

White intends to play Nc3 and Ka2, after which he is winning. But just as on the previous move, 9.d4! would have won: 9...exd4 10.Bxa6 (or simply 10.a3! preparing Ka2 now) 10...bxa6 11.Nc5. Another alternative is 9.c3! Bd7 10.Ka3 b5 11.d4 bxa4 12.Bxa6 Qxg2 13.Qf3! Qg6 14.Qxd5 Bc6 15.Bb5. On the other hand, 9.c4?? would have been a mistake due to 9...b5!! with an attack.

9... Qxa4+!!

A spectacular queen sacrifice, preventing White from playing Nc3 and Ka2, after which Black has insufficient compensation for his material disadvantage. This move theoretically loses, but only in one difficult-to-find variation.

10. Kxa4

White cannot decline the sacrifice, because after 10.Ka2 Black is simply up two pawns with excellent control of the centre and a much safer king.

10... Nc5+ 11. Kb4?

This move is a mistake, allowing Black to play 11...a5+! with tempo and weave a powerful mating net that White must be very careful to avoid. The best move was 11.Kb5!, which would have won after 11...Ne7!! 12.c4! (the only winning move; 12.Kxc5? a5 would transpose to the game) 12...d4 13.Kxc5 a5 14.Qa4+ Kd8 15.Qxa5 Rxa5+ 16.Kb4 Nc6+ 17.Kb3 e4. Other Black tries after 11.Kb5! are worse: 11...b6 threatens ...Bd7, ...a5, and ...d4#, but White can return the queen and still remain up a piece (12.d4! exd4 13.Qxd4 Ne7 14.Qxc5! eliminating the c5-knight), and 11...a5 allows 12.b4! breaking up the attack (not 12.Kxc5? transposing to the game).
11.Ka5?? would have lost after 11...b6+ 12.Kb5 Ne7, with the threat of 13...Ba6+ 14.Kb4 Nc6+ 15.Kc3 d4#.

11... a5+!

In exchange for the knight, Black's pawns will have a stranglehold on the dark squares, and he can try to mate with his light-squared bishop.

12. Kxc5

12.Kc3 has been suggested as a means to avoid the draw, but loses after 12...d4+ 13.Kc4 Be6+!! (13...b6? is unclear, though White must return the queen and is still worse) 14.Kxc5 Nf6! (threatening mate in three with 15...Nd7+ 16.Kb5 c6+ 17.Ka4 Nc5# or Nb6#) and White cannot avoid checkmate or material loss: 15.Bb5+ Ke7 (threatens 16...Ne4#) 16.Qf3 c6 (threatens 17...Nd7#) 17.Bxc6 (Qxf6+ gxf6 held out longer, though still hopeless) 17...Rhc8 (threatens 18...Nd7+ 19.Kb5 bxc6+ 20.Qxc6 and mate in five) 18.Kb6 bxc6 (threatens 19...Nd7+ 20.Kb7 Rab8+! 21.Ka6 Nc5+ 22.Kxa5 Rb5#) 19.Qxf6+ and mate in eight follows.
Every move in the game after 12.Kxc5 is forced.

12... Ne7!

Threatens 13...b6+ with ...Bd7# to follow.

13. Bb5+ Kd8 14. Bc6!!

The only move that avoids checkmate. Its aim is to allow White's king to escape on the light squares.

14... b6+

Not 14...bxc6? and the white king can no longer be mated.

15. Kb5 Nxc6 16. Kxc6

Not 16.c3?? Nd4+! 17.cxd4 Bd7#.

16... Bb7+! 17. Kb5!

Not 17.Kxb7?? Kd7! 18.Qg4+ Kd6! and 19...Rhb8# cannot be prevented.

17... Ba6+ 18. Kc6

Not 18.Ka4?? Bc4! and 19...b5# cannot be prevented.

18... Bb7+ ½–½

Draw agreed. Being down so much material, Black must continue the perpetual check; and due to the checkmating lines above, White must keep repeating.

Position: a8 black rook, d8 black king, h8 black rook, b7 black bishop, c7 black pawn, f7 black pawn, g7 black pawn, h7 black pawn, b6 black pawn, c6 white king, a5 black pawn, d5 black pawn, e5 black pawn, a3 white pawn, b2 white pawn, c2 white pawn, d2 white pawn, g2 white pawn, h2 white pawn, a1 white rook, c1 white bishop, d1 white queen, g1 white knight, h1 white rook

Final position after 18...Bb7+

== See also ==
- Immortal Game
- Immortal Zugzwang Game
- List of chess games
