= Game 6 (disambiguation) =

Game 6 is a 2005 American comedy drama film

Game 6 can also refer to:

- Carlsen versus Nepomniachtchi, World Chess Championship 2021, Game 6 (chess)
- Game 6 of 2011 World Series (baseball)
- Game 6 of the 1998 NBA Finals (basketball)
