= Immortal Zugzwang Game =

Chess game played in 1923

Animation of the game

The Immortal Zugzwang Game is a chess game between Friedrich Sämisch and Aron Nimzowitsch, played in Copenhagen in March 1923. It gained its name because the final position is sometimes considered a rare instance of zugzwang occurring in the middlegame. According to Nimzowitsch, writing in the Wiener Schachzeitung in 1925, this term originated in "Danish chess circles".

== The game (notes by Nimzowitsch) ==
White: Friedrich Sämisch Black: Aron Nimzowitsch Opening: Queen's Indian Defense (ECO E17)

1. d4 Nf6 2. c4 e6 3. Nf3 b6 4. g3 Bb7 5. Bg2 Be7

Queen's Indian Defense.

6. Nc3 0-0 7. 0-0 d5 8. Ne5 c6

Safeguards the position.

9. cxd5?! cxd5 10. Bf4 a6

Protects the outpost station c4, i.e., by ...a6 and ...b5.

11. Rc1 b5 12. Qb3 Nc6

The ghost! With noiseless steps he presses on towards c4.

13. Nxc6

Samisch sacrifices two tempi (exchange of the tempo-eating Knight on e5 for the Knight which is almost undeveloped) merely to be rid of the ghost.

13... Bxc6 14. h3?! Qd7 15. Kh2 Nh5

I could have supplied him with as yet a second ghost by ...Qb7 and ...Knight–d7–b6–c4, but I wished to turn my attention to the King's side.

16. Bd2 f5 17. Qd1 b4! 18. Nb1 Bb5 19. Rg1 Bd6 20. e4? fxe4!!

This sacrifice, which has a quite surprising effect, is based upon the following sober calculation: two Pawns and the seventh rank and an enemy Queen's wing which cannot be disentangled – all this for only one piece!

21. Qxh5 Rxf2 22. Qg5? Raf8 23. Kh1?! R8f5 24. Qe3 Bd3 25. Rce1 h6!! 0–1

A brilliant move which announces the Zugzwang. White has not a move left. If, e.g., Kh2 or g4, then R5f3. Black can now make waiting moves with his King, and White must, willy-nilly, eventually throw himself upon the sword.

Position: g8 black king, d7 black queen, g7 black pawn, a6 black pawn, d6 black bishop, e6 black pawn, h6 black pawn, d5 black pawn, f5 black rook, b4 black pawn, d4 white pawn, e4 black pawn, d3 black bishop, e3 white queen, g3 white pawn, h3 white pawn, a2 white pawn, b2 white pawn, d2 white bishop, f2 black rook, g2 white bishop, b1 white knight, e1 white rook, g1 white rook, h1 white king

Final position after 25...h6!!

== Objections to the sobriquet ==
Andrew Soltis has objected to the characterization of this game as "the Immortal Zugzwang Game", explaining: "First, Saemisch could have moved one of his pieces, even though it would have returned the sacrificed piece to Nimzovich. The game could have then proceeded for a good long time after that with Saemisch gaining some breathing space. But, secondly, the game doesn't constitute a true zugzwang because at the very end Nimzovich had a threat to win his opponent's queen. What makes zugzwang such a painful death is that the deceased is executed not by a threat but by his own suicide." Similarly, Wolfgang Heidenfeld wrote, "zugzwang, in the proper meaning of the term, does not enter into the game at any stage. In the final position Black threatens [...R5f3], against which White has no reply." Raymond Keene wrote in his biography of Nimzowitsch, "This is the so-called 'Immortal Zugzwang Game'. I prefer to see it as an example of total paralysis of the opposition; the ultimate express of prophylaxis, where the opponent's possibilities are reduced to that degree above zero required to avoid stalemate." However, as seen above, Nimzovich regarded it as a Zugzwang, and any piece move by White loses additional material compared to the R5f3 threat.

== Other contenders for the title ==
Podgaets vs. Dvoretsky, 1974

Position: f8 black rook, a7 black pawn, g7 black king, a6 white pawn, b6 black pawn, d6 black pawn, g6 black pawn, c5 black pawn, d5 white pawn, g4 black knight, h4 black queen, b2 white pawn, c2 white pawn, f2 white pawn, g2 white queen, f1 white rook, g1 white king, h1 white bishop

Position after 29.Qg2

Position: a7 black pawn, a6 white pawn, b6 black pawn, d6 black pawn, g6 black pawn, h6 black king, c5 black pawn, d5 white pawn, c4 white pawn, g4 black knight, h4 black queen, f3 black rook, b2 white pawn, f2 white pawn, g2 white queen, f1 white rook, g1 white king, h1 white bishop

Final position after 30...Kh6!!

Soltis writes that his "candidate for the ideal zugzwang game" is the game Podgaets–Dvoretsky, USSR 1974:

1. d4 c5 2. d5 e5 3. e4 d6 4. Nc3 Be7 5. Nf3 Bg4 6. h3 Bxf3 7. Qxf3 Bg5! 8. Bb5+ Kf8! Black exchanges off his bad bishop, but does not allow White to do the same. 9. Bxg5 Qxg5 10. h4 Qe7 11. Be2 h5 12. a4 g6 13. g3 Kg7 14. 0-0 Nh6 15. Nd1 Nd7 16. Ne3 Rhf8 17. a5 f5 18. exf5 e4! 19. Qg2 Nxf5 20. Nxf5+ Rxf5 21. a6 b6 22. g4? hxg4 23. Bxg4 Rf4 24. Rae1 Ne5! 25. Rxe4 Rxe4 26. Qxe4 Qxh4 27. Bf3 Rf8!! 28. Bh1 If instead 28.Qxh4 then 28...Nxf3+ followed by 29...Nxh4 leaves Black a piece ahead. 28... Ng4 29. Qg2 (see first diagram) Rf3!! 30. c4 Kh6!! 0–1 (see second diagram) Now all of White's piece moves allow checkmate or ...Rxf2 with a crushing attack (e.g. 31.Qxf3 Qh2#; 31.Rb1 Rxf2 32.Qxg4 Qh2#). That leaves only moves of White's b-pawn, which Black can ignore, e.g. 31.b3 Kg7 32.b4 Kh6 33.bxc5 bxc5 and White has run out of moves.

Harper vs. Zuk, 1971

Position: g8 black king, a7 black pawn, g7 black knight, b6 black pawn, d6 black pawn, b5 white pawn, c5 black pawn, d5 white pawn, h5 black pawn, c4 white pawn, e4 black queen, g4 black pawn, h4 white pawn, a3 white pawn, g3 white pawn, g2 white rook, h2 white queen, f1 black rook, g1 white knight, h1 white king

Position after 37.b5

Position: g8 black king, a7 black pawn, g7 black knight, b6 black pawn, d6 black pawn, a5 white pawn, b5 white pawn, c5 black pawn, d5 white pawn, h5 black pawn, c4 white pawn, e4 black queen, g4 black pawn, h4 white pawn, g3 white pawn, g2 white rook, h2 white queen, f1 black rook, g1 white knight, h1 white king

Final position after 39...Kg8

Another contender for the title is "the Tomb Game", Bruce Harper–Robert Zuk, Halloween Open, Burnaby, British Columbia 1971:

1. d4 Nf6 2. c4 g6 3. Nc3 Bg7 4. e4 d6 5. Nf3 0-0 6. Be2 e5 7. 0-0 Nc6 8. d5 Ne7 9. Bd2 Nh5 10. Rc1 c5 11. g3 Nf6 12. a3 Ne8 13. Ne1 f5 14. exf5 Nxf5 15. Bf3 b6 16. Bg2 Nd4 17. f4 Bf5 18. fxe5 Bxe5 19. Bh6 Bg7 20. Bxg7 Nxg7 21. Nd3 Qg5 22. Nf4 Rae8 23. Qa4 Qe7 24. Nb5 Nxb5 25. Qxb5 Qe3+ 26. Kh1 g5 27. Nh3 Bd3 28. Rxf8+ Rxf8 29. Rg1 Be4 30. Qd7 Bxg2+ 31. Rxg2 Qe4 32. Ng1 h6 33. h4 Rf2 34. Qh3 g4 35. Qh2 h5 36. b4 Rf1 37. b5 (see first diagram) Kh8 (accentuating White's predicament – he is literally forced to checkmate himself. In fact the manoeuvre Nf5–e3–d1–f2 would result in checkmate one move sooner) 38. a4 Kh7 39. a5 Kg8 0–1 (see second diagram) After 40.axb6 axb6 or 40.a6 Kh7, White's only legal move is 41.Qh3, after which 41...gxh3 and 42...Qxg2 checkmates White.

However, in each of these games, White has only one or two pieces able to move and a handful of legal moves, compared with over 20 legal moves by 11 different pieces and pawns in the final position of Saemisch-Nimzowitsch.

== See also ==
- Immortal Draw
- Immortal Game
- List of chess games
