= Kasparov versus the World =

Game of chess

Animation of the game. White: Kasparov. Black: World Team.

Kasparov versus the World was a game of chess played in 1999 over the Internet. It was a consultation game, in which a World Team of thousands decided each move for the black pieces by plurality vote, while Garry Kasparov conducted the white pieces by himself. More than 50,000 people from over 75 countries participated in the game.

The host and promoter of the match was the MSN Gaming Zone, with sponsorship from First USA bank. After 62 moves played over four months, Kasparov won the game. The game produced a mixture of deep tactical and strategic ideas; Kasparov wrote that he had never expended as much effort on any other game in his life. He later said, "It is the greatest game in the history of chess. The sheer number of ideas, the complexity, and the contribution it has made to chess make it the most important game ever played."

== Background ==
In the 1990s, Garry Kasparov was considered the reigning chess champion. (Note: There was a split between the FIDE Chess Championships and the PCA/Classical championships in the era; Kasparov was the highest rated player and had defeated Vishy Anand at the Classical World Chess Championship 1995. Anatoly Karpov had won the FIDE World Chess Championship 1998, however.) Kasparov says he originally discussed the idea of a correspondence match in 1997 after his second match with Deep Blue in 1997; his friend Fred Friedel suggested arranging such a match and to work with the newspaper Der Spiegel. Nothing came of it, but Kasparov was intrigued. He was interested in expanding his presence on the Internet, and thought he could get more interest from investors if he could measure a potential audience and show interest. He looked to partner with an existing major Internet presence who would be able to handle an event of its size and came to Microsoft, which was happy to work with him. The event would be run on the MSN Gaming Zone website.

The main concern for Microsoft was the possibility that the game could turn into a farce if the World were to succumb to blunders that would turn the game into a rout early. The most prominent previous example of majority Internet voting had produced only mediocre competition; in 1996, Anatoly Karpov easily defeated the voters against him in such a match. As such, several innovative measures were taken. Analysts would explain the situation for more casual voters and help the World avoid catastrophic blunders. Kasparov, however, did not want the match to turn into a grudge match with a rival grandmaster (GM), figuring that this would be too close to his normal matches. It was decided that several teenage chess stars would be recruited to aid the World team and suggest moves. MSN recruited (in decreasing order of FIDE rating) 16-year-old GM Étienne Bacrot, 19-year-old Florin Felecan, 15-year-old Irina Krush (already the U.S. Women's Chess champion), and 14-year-old Elisabeth Paehtz. GM Daniel King would provide overall running commentary and act as a moderator; while not directly recommending moves to the World Team, he could act as a fifth advocate and clarify the state of the position. The pace of the game was also set to one move a day: 12 hours for Kasparov to move, 12 hours for the analysts to see the move and write recommendations, 18 hours for the World Team to vote and discuss, and 6 hours to validate voting. Also, MSN provided a bulletin board forum for the discussion of the World Team's moves. It was hoped that these advantages would raise the level of play and keep the game exciting.

The World Team also benefited from computer chess analysis. Interested voters such as "The Computer Chess Team" used distributed computing to analyze possible lines and make recommendations to the World. Kasparov himself consulted with Yury Dokhoian and Boris Alterman for advice at times.

The game was launched on June 21, 1999, with a promotional event at Bryant Park in New York for the kickoff that featured both Kasparov and World Team advisor Irina Krush.

== The game ==
White: Garry Kasparov Black: The World Team
Opening: Sicilian Defence, Canal–Sokolsky Attack (ECO B52)

1. e4 c5 2. Nf3 d6 3. Bb5+

Position: a8 black rook, b8 black knight, c8 black bishop, d8 black queen, e8 black king, f8 black bishop, g8 black knight, h8 black rook, a7 black pawn, b7 black pawn, e7 black pawn, f7 black pawn, g7 black pawn, h7 black pawn, d6 black pawn, b5 white bishop, c5 black pawn, e4 white pawn, f3 white knight, a2 white pawn, b2 white pawn, c2 white pawn, d2 white pawn, f2 white pawn, g2 white pawn, h2 white pawn, a1 white rook, b1 white knight, c1 white bishop, d1 white queen, e1 white king, h1 white rook

Position after 3.Bb5+, called the Canal–Sokolsky Attack, Moscow Variation, or Rossolimo Attack. Kasparov wanted to avoid the more typical 3.d4 which can lead to a Najdorf Sicilian.

Kasparov played his first move 1.e4 on June 21, and the World Team voted by a 41% plurality to meet him on his home turf with the Sicilian Defence. Kasparov's third move was unusual for him. He typically plays the more ambitious 3.d4 in this position, which promptly leads to an open game. Kasparov commented that Bb5+ had something of a weak reputation until the 1990s, but he had been impressed with both Vasyl Ivanchuk and Alexei Shirov playing it against him for a win. Additionally, Vladimir Kramnik had played it twice against Boris Gelfand at the 1994 Candidates, winning once and drawing the other game. Kasparov was apologetic about the move, but excused himself in light of his expected upcoming championship match against Vishy Anand, where he expected the Najdorf Sicilian—a natural extension of 2...d6 3.d4—to be a potential battlefield. (Note: The championship match with Anand would never actually happen; the match was delayed and Kasparov eventually played Kramnik instead at the Classical World Chess Championship 2000.)

3... Bd7 4. Bxd7+ Qxd7 5. c4

Some 30% of viewers wanted Black to play 4...Nxd7, but were outvoted by those who thought Black's queen was safe on the light squares with White's light-squared bishop off and preferred to develop the knight to c6. With c4, Kasparov solidified his hold on the d5-square by advancing the c-pawn before developing his queen's knight, which joined the attack on d5 on the next move. The resulting pawn formation for White is sometimes called the Maróczy Bind, a way of cramping Black's position. The World Team responded by contesting control of the d4-square.

5... Nc6 6. Nc3 Nf6 7. 0-0 g6

Now Black must try to castle on the kingside and can set it up by developing the king's bishop to either the e- or g-files. Rather than move the e-pawn to e6 or e5 and have the dark-squared bishop blocked by the d-pawn, the World Team opted to fianchetto the remaining bishop, further contesting the dark central squares. Kasparov immediately broke up the center with his queen's pawn, before the black bishop could come to bear.

8. d4 cxd4 9. Nxd4 Bg7 10. Nde2

The center was too hot for the white knight on d4, because the World Team was threatening a discovered attack by moving the black knight away from f6, unmasking the g7-bishop. Exchanging knights on c6 would have been silly for Kasparov, as it would have brought a black pawn to c6, giving the World Team greater control of d5; instead, a retreat was in order. All of Kasparov's moves up to this point were considered good according to opening theory of the time. If White had wanted to achieve the strategic aims of this opening line, i.e. cramping Black's position without allowing counterplay, then either a different move (10.Nc2) or a different move order was necessary. Slightly more popular today is 7.d4 and after 7...cxd4 8.Nxd4 Qe6 would now lose the queen. 7.d4 does allow two other queen sorties with 7... Qg4?! or after 7...cxd4 8.Nxd4 Qg4.

10... Qe6!?

Position: a8 black rook, e8 black king, h8 black rook, a7 black pawn, b7 black pawn, e7 black pawn, f7 black pawn, g7 black bishop, h7 black pawn, c6 black knight, d6 black pawn, e6 black queen, f6 black knight, g6 black pawn, c4 white pawn, e4 white pawn, c3 white knight, a2 white pawn, b2 white pawn, e2 white knight, f2 white pawn, g2 white pawn, h2 white pawn, a1 white rook, c1 white bishop, d1 white queen, f1 white rook, g1 white king

After 10...Qe6!?. This was a novelty by the World Team that blew the game wide open. The black queen forks two central pawns and White cannot save them without joining the battle for the center.

Black finally secured the opportunity to castle but instead opted to complicate the position. This move was a novelty by the World Team, i.e. a move which had never before been played in a recorded game. Krush discovered and analyzed the move, and enlisted Paehtz to recommend it as well, to give it a better chance of winning the vote. Their combined advocacy, plus much discussion on the bulletin board, was enough to gain it 53% of the vote. After this move, MSN requested that the four official analysts not coordinate with each other, perhaps to ensure a greater variety of recommendations. The analysts worked in isolation from each other thereafter.

10...Qe6 has since been played frequently, though 10...0-0 also remains popular, according to ChessBase. The move was played against Kasparov again in a 2009 match against Gabriel Gaehwiler.

The tenth move was a turning point for the World Team, not only because it increased Krush's stature and energized the World Team, but because it blew the position on the board wide open. The black queen forked Kasparov's central pawns; he could not save them both. Counterattacking with 11.Qb3 would have been met by 11...0-0 12.Qxb7 Rfc8, and the World Team would have won back a central pawn with a favorable game. Kasparov was forced to enter the maelstrom with the next several moves.

11. Nd5 Qxe4 12. Nc7+ Kd7 13. Nxa8 Qxc4 14. Nb6+ axb6

Position: h8 black rook, b7 black pawn, d7 black king, e7 black pawn, f7 black pawn, g7 black bishop, h7 black pawn, b6 black pawn, c6 black knight, d6 black pawn, f6 black knight, g6 black pawn, c4 black queen, a2 white pawn, b2 white pawn, e2 white knight, f2 white pawn, g2 white pawn, h2 white pawn, a1 white rook, c1 white bishop, d1 white queen, f1 white rook, g1 white king

After 14...axb6. The position is materially even, but Black has a lead in development and control of the center to compensate for the doubled pawns and centralized king.

After forced moves on both sides, Kasparov made a desperado move with his knight to cause the World Team to have doubled pawns. Materially the game was still even, with a knight and two pawns balancing a rook. Positionally, the World Team had the disadvantages of doubled pawns and a centralized king, but the advantage of a lead in development and a central pawn mass. With no central pawns, Kasparov had no clear-cut way to expose the black king. In the judgment of many commentators, the World Team was at least equal, and it was perhaps Kasparov who was fighting uphill.

Kasparov rose to the challenge with an excellent move picked from alternatives which would have let the World Team take a strong initiative. For instance, it was tempting to harass the black queen and possibly fianchetto the queen's bishop with 15.b3, but this would have invited the World Team to switch wings and initiate a kingside attack with 15...Qh4. Or, to blindly follow the rule "never move a piece twice in the opening when you can develop another piece" with 15.Be3 would have allowed the World Team to play 15...Nd5, bringing the black knight to the square it most fervently wished to occupy. Kasparov's actual move contested d5, somewhat blunted the effect of the black bishop on g7, and retained a compact, flexible position.

15. Nc3!

On the fifteenth move the World Team hotly debated a number of promising alternatives, including 15...e6 (still contesting d5), 15...d5 (occupying d5 outright!), 15...Ne4 (trading off Kasparov's best-placed piece), 15...Rd8 (intending to artificially castle and mobilize the central pawns), 15...Ra8 (pressuring the queenside and threatening a rook lift via a5), and 15...b5 (threatening to dislodge the white knight and pressure the queenside). The plethora of strong options available to the World Team was reflected in the analysts' recommending four different moves.

By this point in the game, several chess clubs had begun posting daily analysis to complement what was available on the official bulletin board and Web site of the game. The weightiest of these was the "Grandmaster Chess School" or GM School, a consortium of Russian grandmasters in St. Petersburg. For the World Team's 15th move, they recommended 15...b5, along with Paehtz. Some people expected the unofficial recommendation of the GM School to be influential, particularly when the official analysts could not agree, but 15...b5 came in a distant second with 15% of the vote. In first place was Jon Speelman's idea of 15...Ra8 with 48% of the vote.

15... Ra8

The results of the vote were a reflection of the increasing coordination of the World Team. Krush was maintaining an analysis tree, and continually updating with all the suggestions and refutations from the bulletin board. Not only did the analysis tree allow the World Team to work with less duplication of effort, it served as a standing, detailed argument for the correctness of the recommended move.

In short, Krush was facilitating two tasks simultaneously: not only discovering a good move, but building a consensus that it was indeed a good move. Given that she had become the center of all the cooperative effort of the World Team (as opposed to individual effort, however heroic), even players of much greater strength began sharing their ideas with her, so that she would incorporate them into her analysis. In particular, Alexander Khalifman of the GM School struck up a constructive correspondence with her.

16. a4!

This move was directed at the World's maneuverer 16...Ra5, which could now be met by 17.Nb5!, paralyzing Black's queenside. Simultaneously, Kasparov threatened a rook lift of his own via Ra3, which could disrupt Black's plans in several continuations. Finally, 16.a4 prevented the World Team's doubled b-pawns from advancing, thus making them future targets. The game remained very unclear and dynamic, but it suddenly appeared to be the World Team which was fighting to maintain the equilibrium.

Again for the 16th move the four analysts made four different recommendations. This time Krush's suggestion of 16...Ne4 garnered 50% of the vote to 14% for 16...Nd4 in second place.

16... Ne4 17. Nxe4 Qxe4 18. Qb3

Position: a8 black rook, b7 black pawn, d7 black king, e7 black pawn, f7 black pawn, g7 black bishop, h7 black pawn, b6 black pawn, c6 black knight, d6 black pawn, g6 black pawn, a4 white pawn, e4 black queen, b3 white queen, b2 white pawn, f2 white pawn, g2 white pawn, h2 white pawn, a1 white rook, c1 white bishop, f1 white rook, g1 white king

After 18.Qb3. Kasparov responded to the aggressive play of the World Team with this fork by his queen. But the World Team, aided by Alexander Khalifman, found suitable counterplay.

On the 16th move, the World Team forced Kasparov to trade off his only piece that was not on the back rank, and simultaneously unmasked the action of the g7-bishop. Kasparov responded with a queen fork of the black pawns on b6 and f7. The loss of a pawn appeared unavoidable, but the World Team uncovered ways to gain some counterplay. The bulletin board debate raged between playing 18...e6 19.Qxb6 Nd4, to make sure it was the weak doubled pawn which went missing, or the more aggressive immediate 18...Nd4, allowing 19.Qxf7. Khalifman, however, found the extremely subtle move 18...f5, and after chewing it over, the bulletin board was more or less convinced.

The strength of the bulletin board consensus was tested when the other three analysts unanimously recommended 18...Nd4. The vote came out with 43% in favor of Krush's recommendation of 18...f5, and 35% in favor of the otherwise unanimous recommendation of 18...Nd4. This sparked grumbling on the bulletin board that Krush had "taken over the game". Krush's influence on the voters was clear; her recommendations were selected every single move from the 10th to the 50th.

18... f5!

The World Team conceded Kasparov the b6 pawn, but for a price. After 19.Qxb6 Nd4, the World Team would have had dual threats of Nc2 and Ra6, ensuring very active play for the pawn. If instead Kasparov continued developing with 19.Be3, the World Team could have offered a queen trade with 19...Qb4, and banked on the central pawn mass to be quite strong in any endgame. But rather than these, Kasparov once again found a powerful continuation: a developing move with stronger attacking possibilities.

19. Bg5

Kasparov, up against stiff resistance from the World Team, began to drop hints that he was effectively playing against the GM School, and not against the Internet as a whole, but move 19 contradicted this line of thought. The GM School recommended 19...Qd4, while the bulletin board found a flaw in their analysis, and generally favored 19...Qb4 as being more forcing. Furthermore, for much of the game, a few top grandmasters of the GM School were busy with other commitments, and the World Team analysis was driven instead by a handful of dedicated International Masters, United States Masters, and dozens of amateurs exploring lines with chess software.

On this particular move, the voting was further complicated by a large faction in favor of 19...Nd4, with a counterattack, and this was the recommendation of both Felecan and Paehtz. The winning total of 35% for 19...Qb4 was the lowest winning total for any move of the game, perhaps because the move essentially forced Kasparov to intensify his attack on the kingside. Note that a queen trade was strategically out of the question for White, as it leads to a favorable endgame for Black.

19... Qb4 20. Qf7

Position: a8 black rook, b7 black pawn, d7 black king, e7 black pawn, f7 white queen, g7 black bishop, h7 black pawn, b6 black pawn, c6 black knight, d6 black pawn, g6 black pawn, f5 black pawn, g5 white bishop, a4 white pawn, b4 black queen, b2 white pawn, f2 white pawn, g2 white pawn, h2 white pawn, a1 white rook, f1 white rook, g1 white king

After 20.Qf7. Black can grab a pawn and protect the bishop with 20...Qxb2, but this would result in terrific pressure on the e7-pawn and the black king.

On move twenty it was tempting for the World Team to grab a pawn and protect the g7-bishop with 20...Qxb2, daring the white rooks to occupy whichever files they chose, but in many continuations the World Team's king would sit rather uncomfortably in the center. After much debate on the bulletin board, no clear refutation of the pawn grab was discovered, but it was still deemed too risky by many. Bacrot, Felecan, Paehtz, and King independently agreed, and by a large margin the World Team decided to protect the bishop and close the e-file with

20... Be5!

Kasparov did not fall for the simple trap of grabbing the h-pawn, (21.Qxh7 Rh8 skewering Kasparov's queen and h-pawn: 22.Qxg6 Bxh2+ 23.Kh1 Qg4 with at least an extra piece for the World Team) but opted for a simple defensive move which restored his threat to plunder Black's kingside.

21. h3

A few World Team members favored shoring up the kingside with 21...Rh8, effectively admitting that the 15th move was a mistake. To defend in that way would have left Black with a very passive position, and invited Kasparov to activate his pieces. Instead, the World Team opted to play actively, exchanging the kingside pawns for Kasparov's queenside pawns. This line showed that the pressure the black rook exerted on the queenside was not illusory, and Kasparov's reply on move 16, albeit brilliant, did create a weakness.

21... Rxa4 22. Rxa4 Qxa4 23. Qxh7 Bxb2 24. Qxg6 Qe4 25. Qf7 Bd4

Position: b7 black pawn, d7 black king, e7 black pawn, f7 white queen, b6 black pawn, c6 black knight, d6 black pawn, f5 black pawn, g5 white bishop, d4 black bishop, e4 black queen, h3 white pawn, f2 white pawn, g2 white pawn, f1 white rook, g1 white king

After 25...Bd4. The game has begun to assume features of an endgame: White and Black are now in a race to promote their h- and b-pawns, respectively.

The dust settled, and the material was still even, with a rook balancing a knight and two pawns. With a pair of rooks exchanged, and neither side having pawn levers to use against the enemy king, both kings were safe enough that direct attacks became less likely. Therefore, although the queens remained on the board, the game started to take the character of an endgame, with the struggle to promote a pawn rising to the foreground. Indeed, Kasparov could have immediately begun marching his h-pawn forward, and the World Team would have had difficulty restraining it. On the other hand, the World Team's b-pawn would have been able to advance equally quickly, making the position very double-edged. Rather than launching the race at once, Kasparov made a subtle move to tie down the World Team into a more passive position.

26. Qb3

Kasparov hit at the weak b-pawn, and prepared Be3. The World Team did not want to trade bishops, and considered the consolidating move 26...Bc5 so that 27.Be3 could be met with 27...Nd4. Kasparov had the even deeper threat, however, of first using his queen to help his rook into play. After 26...Bc5 27.Qb1!, the World Team could not have accepted a queen exchange which would bring the white rook to life, but moving the queen away would allow 28.Re1, and suddenly the white pieces would be coordinating very well.

Consistent with previous moves, the World Team found a sharp, active alternative in 26...f4, which extensive analysis showed to be at least as good as 26...Bc5. However, Krush's recommendation on behalf of the bulletin board once again stood alone against the unanimous recommendations of the other three analysts. In an extremely close vote, 26...f4 edged out 26...Bc5 by a margin of 42.61% to 42.14%.

26... f4!

The World Team blocked off Kasparov's bishop from its natural post on e3, and threatened to generate an attack on the white king after all. 27.Qb1 could be met by 27...Bxf2+, while 27.Qd1 would run into 27...f3, and starting the pawn race with 27.h4 would be answered by 27...Ne5 with attacking play for the World Team. Kasparov instead opted for a simple and natural move.

27. Qf7

Moving the queen to the square it just came from only appeared to lose a tempo. In actuality, the World Team had to use a move to defend the f-pawn. Furthermore, the white queen indirectly supported Kasparov's h-pawn to advance, and put the brakes on the World Team's threat of advancing the f-pawn to f3. After the World Team defended the f-pawn, Kasparov decided to launch the race to queening which had been hovering in the background for several moves.

27... Be5 28. h4 b5 29. h5 Qc4

Position: b7 black pawn, d7 black king, e7 black pawn, f7 white queen, c6 black knight, d6 black pawn, b5 black pawn, e5 black bishop, g5 white bishop, h5 white pawn, c4 black queen, f4 black pawn, f2 white pawn, g2 white pawn, f1 white rook, g1 white king

After 29...Qc4. Black could not match the march of White's h-pawn by playing 29...b4, without losing tempo. The game has started to shift toward Kasparov's advantage.

The World Team could not afford to blindly keep racing the b-pawn forward with 29...b4, because the white queen still guarded the b3-square, which Black would have to lose a tempo to guard before advancing again. The move 29...Qc4, in contrast, did not lose a tempo, because Kasparov could not afford to trade queens in a way that would have undoubled the black pawns and given the World Team a central pawn steamroller for the endgame. The alternative 29...Qe2 also might have held the fort for Black, by offering to exchange the white h-pawn for the black f-pawn. As part of the trade, however, the bishops would also have come off, and none of the four analysts were prepared to trade the World Team's lovely bishop for Kasparov's cramped one just yet.

Some of the bulletin board analysis focused on Kasparov's possible reply 30.Qf8, keeping the queens on the board and threatening to harass the black king from behind. Computer checking of many lines, however, found no advantage for White in this strategy, and in fact revealed chances for White to press too hard in a complex position and stumble into disadvantage. Kasparov elected to force a queen trade, break free his imprisoned bishop, open the f-file for his rook, and create connected passed pawns in a pure endgame. The World Team's responses were essentially forced.

30. Qf5+ Qe6 31. Qxe6+ Kxe6 32. g3 fxg3 33. fxg3

Position: b7 black pawn, e7 black pawn, c6 black knight, d6 black pawn, e6 black king, b5 black pawn, e5 black bishop, g5 white bishop, h5 white pawn, g3 white pawn, f1 white rook, g1 white king

After 33.fxg3. The ensuing position is sharp for both sides, with six passed pawns in total. Here, as elsewhere in the game, the World Team opted for counterplay.

Despite the reduced material, the position remained sharp due to the presence of six passed pawns. On move 32 Kasparov initiates a sequence that after a pawn exchange will open the f file for his rook and leave a supporting g pawn for his h pawn. On move 33, the World Team had the option of snatching Kasparov's g-pawn, losing two tempi in the queening race. After the sequence 33...Bxg3 34.h6 Be5 35.h7 Bg7 36.Rf8 b4 37.h8=Q Bxh8 38.Rxh8 an extremely unbalanced endgame would have ensued, with Kasparov having a rook and bishop versus the World Team's knight and four pawns. The central position of the black king might have been just enough to hold a draw for the World Team, but none of the four analysts trusted the position enough to recommend it. Instead the World Team opted for counterplay, as usual, this time by a vote of 72%.

33... b4 34. Bf4

Kasparov's offer to trade bishops caught the bulletin board entirely off guard. It had been assumed that Kasparov would try to bring his king into the center to restrain the black pawns, and the World Team gave deep thought to 34.Kf2 Kf5. After Kasparov's actual move, it would have been suicide for the World Team to trade off the precious bishop. 34...Bd4+ looked promising, particularly because it would not lose a tempo, since Kasparov would have to move out of check. After the game, Kasparov said that he would not have been able to break through if the World Team had played the more defensive 34...Bh8, but the possibility did not receive much attention on the bulletin board. Danny King forwarded 34...Bh8 in his running commentary, but all four official analysts felt more comfortable with the more active move, so 34...Bd4+ overwhelmingly won the vote.

34... Bd4+

The World Team had hastily put together proposed defenses against either of Kasparov's king advances 35.Kg2 and 35.Kh2. In one of the former lines, the black knight threatens to usher home the b-pawn and returns to the kingside just barely in time to stop the white h-pawn, delivering a check from f4 on the way. In one of the latter lines it turned out to be critical that the black bishop could attack the white king from e5. But Kasparov stunned everyone (including the GM School) with an incredible move:

35. Kh1!

Although it intuitively makes little sense to move the white king away from the action into a corner where it can neither support the white pawns toward queening, nor delay the black pawns from queening, this move put the World Team in a serious predicament. Some posters on the bulletin board worried that the 33rd move had lost the game for the World Team.

In the scramble following Kasparov's 35th move, no one on the World Team noticed that 35...Ne5 is probably enough to hold the draw, and opted for pushing the b-pawn, influenced by Krush who had discovered what seemed to be adequate continuations for the World Team.

35... b3 36. g4

Position: b7 black pawn, e7 black pawn, c6 black knight, d6 black pawn, e6 black king, h5 white pawn, d4 black bishop, f4 white bishop, g4 white pawn, b3 black pawn, f1 white rook, h1 white king

After 36.g4. Kasparov's connected passed pawns are marching toward victory. Black, on the other hand, is in a very awkward position and must try to salvage a draw.

In this position Kasparov had connected passed pawns supporting each other, whereas the World Team needed the knight (or possibly even the king) to laboriously move into position to usher the black b-pawn to queening. Furthermore, should the black bishop move, the white rook could slide over to g1 where it would support the g-pawn from behind while still keeping an eye on the b1 queening square, an additional subtle point of Kasparov's 35th move. Finally, by temporarily controlling the dark squares with his bishop and the light squares with his pawns (which 36.h6 would not have done) Kasparov kept the black king from advancing to f5, which in some lines would have been sufficient to blockade the pawns.

The bulletin board was near despair at this point, having convinced itself that 36...b2 would lose to 37.g5 Nb4 38.g6 Nd3 39.h6, and then 39...Nxf4 would not be check due to Kasparov's 35th move, and would therefore fail to hold the draw. Similarly an immediate 36...Nb4 would merely transpose to the above line and lose. The only move for which some lines seemed still possibly drawn was 36...Kd5, which Krush duly recommended, but Bacrot and Felecan suggested 36...b2, while Paehtz favored 36...Nb4. This created yet another razor-thin vote, with 36...Kd5 scoring 37.69% of the vote winning over 36...b2 with 37.11%.

36... Kd5!

This game, which had started in June, had now spilled over into September. Kasparov had grown sufficiently confident in his position that he called a press conference about the game, presumably in order to announce a forced win. The black pieces did not seem up to the task of both holding off the white pawns and pushing through the black pawn, while the white rook was working effectively through threats alone, without even moving.

37. g5

Kasparov's two passers apparently required two black pieces to restrain, but the black knight could not cross over via e5 because Kasparov would have simply exchanged the white bishop for it. Therefore, the bulletin board turned its attention to 37...e5, driving away the white bishop and clearing the way for Ne7. But Kasparov had a devilish reply in 38.Bc1! His pawns would be so strong in this line that he could have sacrificed his bishop for Black's b-pawn, particularly since the black bishop would be temporarily cut off from the h8 queening square. Also, in many lines where Black does not force the white bishop to give itself up, it can reverse field with Ba3, tying the black king to the defense of the d6 pawn.

Concerned about the strength of 38.Bc1!, the World Team instead replied:

37... e6

This move opened e7 so the black knight could cross over, but also kept open the a1–h8 diagonal for the black bishop. Kasparov perhaps had thought that 38.Rd1 was winning in this line, a position many participants on the bulletin board agreed with. A Post-game exhaustive analysis shows that 38.Rd1 was winning via a full board zugzwang at move 50, if the world team responded with 38...Ke4. The power of the centralized black king vis-a-vis the white king off in the corner would come into play, showing that even brilliant chess moves have minor disadvantages.

Instead of trying the complexities of the 38.Rd1 line, Kasparov said at his press conference that he had no idea how the game would turn out, and began to force the World Team into an ending in which each side got a new queen, and the outcome was still unclear.

38. h6 Ne7 39. Rd1 e5 40. Be3 Kc4 41. Bxd4 exd4

Position: b7 black pawn, e7 black knight, d6 black pawn, h6 white pawn, g5 white pawn, c4 black king, d4 black pawn, b3 black pawn, d1 white rook, h1 white king

After 41...exd4. The World Team was stuck with a number of repeated forced moves.

The World Team's moves were all essentially forced. Kasparov's main chance to deviate would have been with 40.Bc1, but then 40...Ke6 appeared to hold. Although the black bishop was at that time temporarily cut off from holding back the pawns, the black king was temporarily not cut off, and an extra tempo in such positions makes all the difference. Kasparov, when making his 38th move, had in all probability already elected to force the World Team's responses all the way to move 50.

The World Team's pawns, albeit ungainly, had become a sufficiently potent threat that Kasparov's rook could not serve the double purpose of guarding the home rank and forcing through the passed pawns against Black's knight. Therefore, the white king had to come out of its corner at last.

42. Kg2 b2 43. Kf3 Kc3 44. h7

Kasparov could have made the pawn advance on either of the two previous moves as well, but it would have merely transposed, with the World Team responding as it did in the actual game:

44... Ng6 45. Ke4 Kc2 46. Rh1

Position: b7 black pawn, h7 white pawn, d6 black pawn, g6 black knight, g5 white pawn, d4 black pawn, e4 white king, b2 black pawn, c2 black king, h1 white rook

After 46.Rh1. If Black tries to queen the b-pawn immediately, White wins: 46...b1=Q 47.Rxb1 Kxb1 48.Kxd4.

The World Team needed to advance the d-pawn as well as the b-pawn, in order to get a second queen after Kasparov sacrificed his rook for the first one. Against the recommendations of the analysts, nine percent of the World Team voted for the tempting prospect of immediately queening the b-pawn, which is a blunder that loses after 46...b1=Q? 47.Rxb1 Kxb1 48.Kxd4. The white king arrived to assist the white pawns just as quickly with diagonal moves as with straight ones, and the diagonal moves gave it incidental threats in the center.

46... d3 47. Kf5

For the World Team's 47th move, the analysts were again unanimous, this time recommending immediate queening. 15% of the voters were tempted to try to hang onto the knight a few moves longer with 47...Nh8. This would have led to a lost endgame after 48.g6 d2 49.g7 d1=Q 50.Rxd1 Kxd1 51.gxh8=Q b1=Q+, when Black cannot engineer a perpetual check.

47... b1=Q 48. Rxb1 Kxb1 49. Kxg6 d2 50. h8=Q d1=Q

Position: h8 white queen, b7 black pawn, d6 black pawn, g6 white king, g5 white pawn, b1 black king, d1 black queen

After 50...d1=Q. Seven-men Lomonosov endgame tablebases say it is a draw (49.Kxg6 also draws).

The race to queen a pawn ended in a tie. The position was not equal, though. Kasparov's far-advanced g-pawn was an imminent threat to queen, while the World Team's pawns were potentially liabilities as much as assets, since they could give the white king a modicum of shelter from threatened checks. The general plan of defense for the World Team was to place the king favorably so that Kasparov could not threaten a deadly queen trade, and then determinedly check Kasparov's king to prevent him from queening the g-pawn. In some lines the World Team could gain counterplay by advancing its own pawns, but this was a secondary strategy.

The World Team had relied heavily on computer analysis for much of the game, but at this point the forward-searching chess engines began to produce worthless suggestions. This type of position was not well-handled by 1999 chess programs, until the position became simple enough to use an endgame tablebase. As of October 1999, however, there were no seven-piece endgame tablebases, and seven pieces remained in the actual position. After the game was over, Peter Karrer of Switzerland constructed a specialized tablebase for the purpose of fully understanding this endgame. With the aid of the tablebase, Krush and IM Ken Regan were able to prove that the position after the World Team's 50th move was drawn with best play on both sides. Both Kasparov and the bulletin board suspected that the position was drawn, but as the further course of the game proved, no one fully understood the position at the time.

Some World Team members tried to gain insight from the position by consulting state-of-the-art five-piece tablebases, with the black pawns missing, and were encouraged to find the position dead drawn. Unfortunately for the World Team, the extra black pawns complicated the position enormously, and not necessarily to the World Team's advantage. For example, analysis positions arose which were theoretically drawn with both black pawns in place, but which would be won for White if exactly one black pawn were not there, and then again drawn with both black pawns gone.

Since 2012, seven-piece Lomonosov tablebases have become available which prove that the position is drawn. Moreover, using a special EGTB generator "Hoffman" developed by Brent Baccala, it can be shown that Black can draw without trying to promote its pawns and without moving its king out of the a–d × 1–4 square.

51. Qh7

This move threatened to gain Kasparov a tempo by advancing the king with discovered check. The bulletin board and Krush came up with the response 51...Ka1, which Kasparov later said he had considered as a dead draw, and the subsequent endgame tablebases confirmed to be so. But Felecan recommended 51...d5 and Paehtz favored 51...b5, while Bacrot sat out the turn. For the first time in 40 moves, Krush's recommendation was not selected, receiving only 34% for 51...Ka1. 39% of votes were for Elisabeth Paehtz's 51...b5.

Someone using the alias "Jose Unodos" joked that he rigged the vote for the Paehtz suggestion 51...b7–b5 instead of Kb1–a1 that Krush and most others thought the best move, although MSN said afterward vote-stuffing only affected move 59.

51... b5 52. Kf6+

The bulletin board and Krush now concluded that 52...Kc1 offered the best chances of holding a draw. Kasparov versus the World 1999 analysis via Peter Karrer's special computer program for the position, which was fashioned two weeks after the game was over: If 52...Kc1! (but 52...Kb2 was played in the game), 53.Qe4! Qf1+ 54.Ke7 b4. Here if 55.Qb4, Black must find 55...Qf5 (the only move) 56.Qc3+ Kb1 57.Qf6 Qe4+ (only move) 58.Kf7 Qc4!+ 59.Kg7 d5 (only move) so Black can draw. Upon 55.g6! Qg1! 56.Qf4+ Kd1! 57.Kf7 b3=. Also on 55.g6 Qg1 56.Qc4+ Kd1 57.Qd3+ Kc1—here White cannot theoretically progress. However, with Bacrot recommending 52...Ka1 and both Felecan and Paehtz favoring 52...Kb2, the latter move eked out a victory with 42%. The idea was to use the king to support the b-pawn toward promotion, and tablebases show that either move will hold a draw.

52... Kb2

Kasparov made a reasonable-looking queen maneuver to shelter his king from checks on the f-file:

53. Qh2+

It was postulated at the time that 52...Kb2 was a game-losing mistake, and that Kasparov could have won the game by force after 53. Qe4, but modern tablebases do not bear that out.

53...Ka1! 54. Qf4

Position: d6 black pawn, f6 white king, b5 black pawn, g5 white pawn, f4 white queen, a1 black king, d1 black queen

After 54.Qf4. At this point, Bacrot's recommendation 54...Qd5! could have saved the game, but the World Team chose Krush's doomed 54...b4? instead.

Krush and others on the MSN forum recommended sacrificing the b-pawn with 54...b4 in order to allow the black queen to give check on the f-file. This was partly based on the modified tablebases, which needed to assume exchanges to reach an error-free conclusion, by reducing the number of pieces and possibilities. Bacrot advocated centralizing the black queen with 54...Qd5!, while Felecan and Paehtz suggested 54...Qd3.

Later analysis showed that Bacrot's recommendation could hold the draw in a relatively comprehensible fashion, and Felecan and Paehtz's move could hold after some desperate ingenious squirming, but Krush's move would concede Kasparov a forced win, if he could find it.

54... b4?

This move was the first mistake made in the seven-piece endgame. The tablebase shows that either 54...Qd3 or 54...Qd5 gives a theoretical draw. The idea was to get more activity with their queen and be able to force White's king into several checks; however, it was shown that with good piece coordination the white king would be able to escape the checks and White would promote first with a winning position, demonstrated by Kasparov in the game.

55. Qxb4 Qf3+ 56. Kg7 d5 57. Qd4+ Kb1 58. g6

Position: g7 white king, g6 white pawn, d5 black pawn, d4 white queen, f3 black queen, b1 black king

After 58.g6. Both continuations 58...Qe4 and 58...Qf5 ultimately lose with best play.

Kasparov played forcefully on moves 55–57, and the World Team responded each time with a large majority for the best plausible move. On move 58, both 58...Qe4 and 58...Qf5 looked reasonable, but the bulletin board had analyzed the former to a forced loss. Krush duly recommended the latter. Due to an e-mail mix-up, her recommendation and analysis were not received on time by the MSN site, and voting proceeded for some time with Bacrot and Paehtz both recommending 58...Qe4 against Felecan favoring 58...Qf5. When the weaker move won the vote 49% to 44%, there were dismayed cries from the bulletin board that the game was lost due to the delay of Krush's recommendation, as Krush's recommendations had been closely followed by voters in earlier moves. Krush was still in high school at the time and for this late-breaking move Krush could stay up no longer, and hence her hurried email later in the day.

Kasparov agreed that 58...Qf5 would have put up stiffer resistance, but claimed it was also losing, and published a forced win sequence. Subsequently, tablebases showed an error in Kasparov's analysis, but confirmed that 58...Qf5 could not have saved the draw with best play on both sides. The main line starts with 58...Qf5 59.Kh6 Qe6 60.Qg1+ Ka2 61.Qf2+ Kb1 62.Qd4 Ka2 63.Kg5 Qe7+ 64.Qf6 Qe3+ 65.Qf4 Qg1+ 66.Kf6 Qb6+ 67.Kf7 Qb7+ 68.Ke6 Qc8+ 69.Kf6 Qd8+ 70.Kf5 Qc8+ 71.Kg5 Qc3 72.Qh2+ Ka1 73.Qe2 Kb1 74.Qf2 Qc1+ 75.Kg4 Qc3 76.Qf1+ Kc2 (or 76...Kb2 77.Kf5 Qc7 78.Qe2+ Kb1) 77.Kf5 Qc7 78.Qe2+ Kb1 79.Qd3+ Ka2 80.Qa6+ Kb3 81.Qe6 Ka2 82.Qf7 Qc2+ 83.Ke6 Qe2+ 84.Kxd5.

58... Qe4 59. Qg1+

At this point several disgruntled members of the bulletin board, knowing the game to be lost, suggested the blunder 59...Qe1??. The move 59...Qe1?? got the majority of the votes the next round of voting, but Microsoft invalidated all votes due to ballot stuffing. MSN announced after the game that this was the only move on which ballot stuffing had taken place at a level where it was significant. Microsoft added a resign option to the next vote, which got 28% of the vote after it was first added – a high number, but not the plurality.

59... Kb2 60. Qf2+ Kc1 61. Kf6 d4 62. g7 1–0

With his 62nd move, Kasparov announced a forced checkmate in 28 moves found by the computer program Deep Junior. In light of this, 51% of the World Team voters opted to resign on October 22, four months after the game commenced.

Position: g7 white pawn, f6 white king, d4 black pawn, e4 black queen, f2 white queen, c1 black king

Final position after 62.g7. White's pawn is unstoppable and will promote. The World Team resigned.

== Aftermath ==
Kasparov said, "I spent more time analyzing this than any other game." After the game, Kasparov shocked many people on the MSN forum, which was kept open after multiple requests, by announcing he had been reading the World Team strategy board during the game. This dialogue occurred in the follow-up chat room interview: "Host Chris_MSNBC says: Did you come frequently read our comments in the BBS? Host Garry_Kasparov says: Of course I used it to my advantage to look around and follow the discussion on MSN.COM about the game." He also gave the team credit for a game at the highest level: "I think that the world deserves to make a draw...". Kasparov justified his decision by claiming he needed an advantage. In later World Team games, more secure forums were created with passwords, or the opponent at least pledged to not read the World Team forum.

In 2000, Kasparov published a book about the match: Kasparov Against the World: The Story of the Greatest Online Challenge, co-written with GM Daniel King. The 202-page book holds the record for the longest analysis devoted to a single chess game.

== See also ==
- Correspondence chess
- List of chess games
