= Perpetual check =

Chess situation in which one player can force a draw by repeatedly checking

In the game of chess, perpetual check is a situation in which one player plays an unending series of checks from which the other player cannot escape. This typically arises when the player who is checking feels their position in the game is inferior, they cannot deliver checkmate, and wish to force a draw.

A draw by perpetual check is no longer one of the rules of chess, but will eventually allow a draw claim by either threefold repetition or the fifty-move rule. Players usually agree to a draw long before that.

Perpetual check can also occur in other forms of chess, although the rules relating to it might differ. For example, giving perpetual check is not allowed in shogi and xiangqi, where doing so leads to an automatic loss for the giver.

== Examples ==
Example from Reinfeld

Position: g8 black king, g7 black pawn, g5 white king, h5 white queen, b4 black rook, a3 black queen, d3 black bishop

White to move draws by perpetual check, starting with 1.Qe8+.

In this diagram, Black is ahead a rook, a bishop, and a pawn, which would normally be a decisive material advantage. But White, to move, can draw by perpetual check:

1. Qe8+ Kh7
2. Qh5+ Kg8
3. Qe8+ etc.

The same position will soon repeat for the third time and White can claim a draw by threefold repetition; or the players will agree to a draw.

=== Unzicker vs. Averbakh ===
Unzicker vs. Averbakh, 1952

Position: f8 black rook, g8 black king, b7 black rook, c7 white pawn, g7 black pawn, h7 black pawn, a6 black pawn, f6 black knight, d5 white pawn, e5 black pawn, b4 white pawn, e4 white pawn, f4 black queen, c3 white queen, h3 white pawn, a2 white pawn, g2 white pawn, a1 white rook, e1 white rook, g1 white king

Perpetual check extricates Black from his difficulties.

In the diagram, from Wolfgang Unzicker–Yuri Averbakh, Stockholm Interzonal 1952, Black (on move) would soon be forced to give up one of his rooks for White's c-pawn (to prevent it from promoting or to capture the promoted queen after promotion). He can, however, exploit the weakness of White's kingside pawn structure with

27... Rxc7!
28. Qxc7 Ng4!

Threatening 29...Qh2#. If 29.hxg4 then 29...Qf2+, salvaging a draw by threefold repetition with checks by moving the queen between f2 and h4.

=== Hamppe vs. Meitner ===
Hamppe vs. Meitner, 1872

Position: a8 black rook, c8 black bishop, d8 black king, h8 black rook, c7 black pawn, f7 black pawn, g7 black pawn, h7 black pawn, b6 black pawn, c6 white king, a5 black pawn, d5 black pawn, e5 black pawn, a3 white pawn, b2 white pawn, c2 white pawn, d2 white pawn, g2 white pawn, h2 white pawn, a1 white rook, c1 white bishop, d1 white queen, g1 white knight, h1 white rook

Down massive amounts of material, Black forces a draw by perpetual check.

In a classic game Carl Hamppe–Philipp Meitner, Vienna 1872, following a series of sacrifices Black forced the game to the position in the diagram, where he drew by a perpetual check:

16... Bb7+!
17. Kb5

If 17.Kxb7?? Kd7 18.Qg4+ Kd6 followed by ...Rhb8#.

17... Ba6+
18. Kc6

If 18.Ka4?, 18...Bc4 and 19...b5#.

18... Bb7+ ½–½

=== Leko vs. Kramnik ===
Leko vs. Kramnik, 2008

Position: a8 black rook, h8 black king, a7 black pawn, b7 black pawn, g7 black pawn, h7 black pawn, c6 black pawn, f5 white queen, h4 white pawn, c3 black queen, c2 white pawn, f2 white pawn, g2 white pawn, b1 white king, d1 white rook, h1 white rook

Position after 24.Qxf5

In the game Peter Leko–Vladimir Kramnik, Corus 2008, Black was able to obtain a draw because of perpetual check:

24... Qb4+
25. Ka2 Qa4+
26. Kb2 Qb4+
27. Kc1 Qa3+
28. Kb1 ½–½

If 28.Kd2? Rd8+ 29.Ke2 Qe7+.

=== Fischer vs. Tal ===
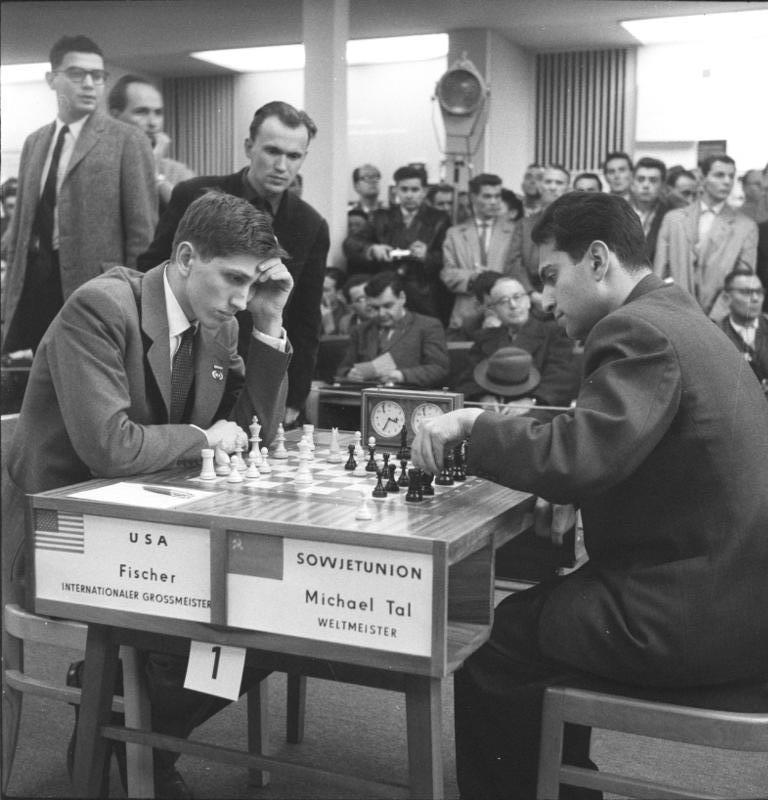
Fischer vs. Tal, 1960

Position: c8 black king, a7 black pawn, b7 black pawn, e7 black knight, h7 white queen, e6 black queen, a5 white pawn, d5 black pawn, a3 white pawn, c3 black pawn, c2 white pawn, f2 white pawn, g2 white king, h2 white pawn, f1 white rook

Position after 21.Kxg2

A perpetual check saved a draw for Mikhail Tal in the game Bobby Fischer–Tal, Leipzig 1960, played in the 14th Chess Olympiad, while Tal was World Champion. In this position Black played

21... Qg4+

and the game was drawn. (After 22.Kh1, then 22...Qf3+ 23.Kg1 Qg4+ forces perpetual check.)

== Mutual perpetual check ==
A. J. Roycroft (after T. R. Dawson), 1976

Position: d6 black rook, e6 black rook, e5 black king, d3 white king, c1 white upside-down knight, f1 white upside-down knight

Mutual discovered perpetual check with nightriders

A mutual perpetual check is not possible using only the orthodox chess pieces, but it is possible using some fairy chess pieces. In the diagram, the pieces represented as inverted knights are nightriders: they move any number of knight moves in a given direction until they are blocked by any piece along the path (that is, a nightrider is to a knight as a queen is to a king, ignoring the rules on check). There could follow:

1. Ke3+ Kd5+
2. Kd3+ Ke5+
3. Ke3+ Kd5+

and so on. This is in fact a mutual perpetual discovered check.

Noam Elkies, 1999

Position: b6 black king, a5 black rook, e5 white king, d4 white knight, b2 black upside-down knight, a1 black bishop, b1 white rook, g1 white bishop

Mutual discovered perpetual check with a camel

Noam Elkies devised in 1999 a mutual discovered perpetual check position that requires only one fairy piece. The piece represented by an inverted knight here is a camel, a (1,3)-leaper. There could follow:

1. Nb5+ Cc5+
2. Nd4+ Cb2+
3. Nb5+ Cc5+

and so on.

Xiangqi and janggi, due to the presence of their cannon pieces, can also have mutual perpetual check.

== Perpetual pursuit ==
S. Birnov, 1928

Position: g8 black bishop, c7 white king, a5 white pawn, c5 black pawn, f5 black king, c4 white pawn, h4 black pawn, c3 white pawn, e3 white pawn

White to play and draw

Related to perpetual check is the perpetual pursuit, which differs in that the continually attacked piece is not the king. The result is similar, in that the opposing side's attack stalls because of the need to respond to the continuous threats.

In the Birnov study illustrated, White's situation seems hopeless: they are down a piece and cannot stop Black's h-pawn, and their passed a-pawn can easily be stopped by Black's bishop. However, they can save themself by restricting the bishop's movement to set up a perpetual pursuit. They begin:

1. a6 Bxc4

A direct pawn race with 1...h3? fails, as White promotes first and covers the promotion square.

2. e4+!

This pawn sacrifice forces Black to limit their bishop's scope along the long diagonal.

2... Kxe4

Forced, as Black has to play ...Bd5 to stop the pawn.

3. a7 Bd5
4. c4!

Denying another square to the bishop, which must stay on the a8–h1 diagonal. This forces

4... Ba8

And White can then begin the perpetual pursuit:

5. Kb8 Bc6
6. Kc7 Ba8

Black can make no progress.

Bilek vs. Schüssler, 1978

Position: a8 black rook, b8 black knight, d8 black queen, e8 black king, f8 black bishop, h8 black rook, a7 black pawn, e7 black knight, f7 black pawn, g7 black pawn, h7 black pawn, b6 black pawn, c6 black pawn, d5 white knight, c4 white bishop, f3 white pawn, g3 white pawn, a2 white pawn, b2 white pawn, f2 white pawn, h2 white pawn, a1 white rook, c1 white bishop, d1 white queen, e1 white king, h1 white rook

White attempts to win the enemy queen...

Position: a8 black rook, b8 black knight, d8 white queen, f8 black bishop, h8 black rook, a7 black pawn, f7 black king, h7 black pawn, b6 black pawn, c6 black pawn, f6 black pawn, d5 black knight, f3 white pawn, g3 white pawn, a2 white pawn, b2 white pawn, f2 white pawn, h2 white pawn, a1 white rook, c1 white bishop, e1 white king, h1 white rook

...but traps his own into a perpetual pursuit.

An example of perpetual pursuit being used in a game occurred in István Bilek–Harry Schüssler, Poutiainen Memorial 1978. Bilek thought he could win the enemy queen with the combination

10. Nf6+ gxf6
11. Bxf7+ Kxf7
12. Qxd8

However, Schüssler replied

12... Nd5! ½–½

and Bilek conceded the draw. His queen is now trapped, and with ...Bb4+ threatening to win it, he has nothing better than 13.0-0 Bg7 14.Qd6 Bf8 15.Qd8 Bg7 with another perpetual pursuit.

== History ==
N.N. vs. Unknown, 1750

Position: a8 black rook, c8 black bishop, a7 black pawn, b7 black pawn, c7 black pawn, f7 white bishop, g7 black pawn, h7 black king, d6 black pawn, g6 white knight, h6 black pawn, e5 black pawn, e4 white pawn, h4 black queen, d3 white pawn, f3 black knight, h3 white pawn, a2 white pawn, b2 white pawn, c2 white pawn, f2 black bishop, g2 white pawn, a1 white rook, c1 white bishop, h1 white king

Final position after 15...Kh7

The Oxford Encyclopedia of Chess Games, Volume 1 (1485–1866) includes all recorded games played up to 1800. The earliest example of perpetual check contained in it is a game played by two unknown players in 1750:

N.N. vs. Unknown, 1750
1. e4 e5 2. Nf3 Nc6 3. Bc4 Bc5 4. 0-0 (the rules of castling not yet having been standardized in their current form, White moved his king to h1 and his rook to f1) 4... Nf6 5. Nc3 Ng4 6. d3 0-0 (Black moved his king to h8 and his rook to f8) 7. Ng5 d6 8. h3 h6 9. Nxf7+ Rxf7 10. Bxf7 Qh4 11. Qf3 Nxf2+ 12. Rxf2 Bxf2 13. Nd5 Nd4 14. Ne7 Nxf3 15. Ng6+ Kh7 ½–½ in light of 16.Nf8+ Kh8 17.Ng6+ etc.

The next examples of perpetual check in the book are two games, both ending in perpetual check, played in 1788 between Bowdler and Philidor, with Philidor giving odds of pawn and move.

A draw by perpetual check used to be in the rules of chess. Howard Staunton gave it as one of six ways to draw a game in The Chess-Player's Handbook. It has since been removed because perpetual check will eventually allow a draw claim by either threefold repetition or the fifty-move rule. If a player demonstrates intent to perform perpetual check, the players usually agree to a draw.

== See also ==
- Desperado
- Rules of chess
- Stalemate
