= Anand's Immortal =

Chess game played by Viswanathan Anand

Game animation

Anand's Immortal is a chess game played by Levon Aronian as White against Viswanathan Anand as Black in Round 4 of the 2013 Tata Steel Chess Tournament.

The game is considered one of Anand's greatest masterpieces; Chess.com staff ranked it as the third-best chess game of all time, behind Kasparov's Immortal and the Opera Game.

== The game ==
White: Aronian Black: Anand Opening: Semi-Slav Defense: Meran Variation (ECO D47)

1. d4 d5 2. c4 c6 3. Nf3 Nf6 4. Nc3 e6 5. e3 Nbd7 6. Bd3 dxc4 7. Bxc4 b5 8. Bd3 Bd6 9. O-O O-O 10. Qc2 Bb7 11. a3 Rc8

The game opens up in a very theoretical and well-known fashion. Only at move 12 do the players start innovating with novel ideas.

Position: c8 black rook, d8 black queen, f8 black rook, g8 black king, a7 black pawn, b7 black bishop, d7 black knight, f7 black pawn, g7 black pawn, h7 black pawn, c6 black pawn, d6 black bishop, e6 black pawn, f6 black knight, b5 black pawn, g5 white knight, d4 white pawn, a3 white pawn, c3 white knight, d3 white bishop, e3 white pawn, b2 white pawn, c2 white queen, f2 white pawn, g2 white pawn, h2 white pawn, a1 white rook, c1 white bishop, f1 white rook, g1 white king

Position after 12. Ng5

12. Ng5?!

Aronian tempts Anand to play 12...Bxh2+, winning a pawn, where white might enjoy greater piece activity.

12...c5!

Anand responds with a pawn sacrifice (h7) of his own, which Aronian accepts.

13. Nxh7 Ng4

This calls to mind the similar 20...Ng4 from the game Rotlewi versus Rubinstein.

14. f4?

White should have played 14. h3!, which gives an unclear position after 14...Bh2+ 15. Kh1 Qh4.

14...cxd4 15. exd4 Bc5!

The first of a series of sacrifices to come. If white accepts the sacrifice, Black will capture back on c5, followed by a quick invasion with Qd4+ and Nf2.

Position: c8 black rook, d8 black queen, f8 black rook, g8 black king, a7 black pawn, b7 black bishop, d7 black knight, f7 black pawn, g7 black pawn, h7 white knight, e6 black pawn, b5 black pawn, c5 black bishop, d4 white pawn, f4 white pawn, g4 black knight, a3 white pawn, c3 white knight, b2 white pawn, c2 white queen, e2 white bishop, g2 white pawn, h2 white pawn, a1 white rook, c1 white bishop, f1 white rook, g1 white king

Position after 16. Be2

16. Be2 Nde5!!

Black is still trying to clear the way for Qxd4+ and Nf2 and doesn't mind giving up a knight to do so.

17. Bxg4 Bxd4+ 18. Kh1 Nxg4 19. Nxf8

If white plays 19. Ng5, black would continue similar to the game with f5, followed by either Rf6-h6 or Qh4.

19...f5!

Black cuts off white's chances of defense against the black queen.

20. Ng6 Qf6 21. h3 Qxg6 22. Qe2

White cannot take the knight on g4 as there would be Qh5#.

Position: c8 black rook, g8 black king, a7 black pawn, b7 black bishop, g7 black pawn, e6 black pawn, b5 black pawn, f5 black pawn, h5 black queen, f4 white pawn, g4 black knight, a3 white pawn, c3 white knight, d3 white queen, e3 black bishop, h3 white pawn, b2 white pawn, g2 white pawn, a1 white rook, c1 white bishop, f1 white rook, h1 white king

The final position

22...Qh5 23. Qd3 Be3! 0-1

Interfering white's defense against Qxh3+ (the g-pawn is pinned). Aronian sees no way out and finally resigns.
