= Florin Felecan =

American chess player (born 1980)

Personal information
- Born: April 7, 1980 (age 46) Brașov, Romania

Chess career
- Country: Romania (until 1998); United States (since 1998)
- Title: International Master (2009)
- FIDE rating: 2322 (February 2020)
- Peak rating: 2430 (November 2009)

Florin Felecan (born April 7, 1980, in Brasov) is an American chess player who holds the title of International Master. Born in Romania, he resides in Skokie, Illinois, having moved there on July 17, 1997, along with his family.

== Chess career ==
Felecan is a multiple-time former junior national champion of Romania. In 1994, he tied for first in the U14 European Championships with a 7/9 points performance. He won the 1998 National Denker Tournament of High School Champions in Hawaii with 5/5 record.

He served as one of four advisors on the World team in the Kasparov versus The World chess match in 1999.

Felecan attended University of Maryland - Baltimore County (UMBC) on a chess scholarship from 1998 until 1999. He played first/second board and led UMBC to the Pan-American team Championship in Dallas (1998) and Toronto (1999), but left shortly thereafter. He intermittently played chess from 2000 through 2002, then stopped playing until May 2006.

Felecan began actively seeking his International Master title after being contacted by organizer Sevan Muradian. Felecan achieved the three required title norms between April 2009 and July 2009. He became the third person to earn all three required title norms at the North American FIDE Invitational series organized by Sevan Muradian, behind IM Mehmed Pasalic (the first person to achieve this) and GM Marc Arnold (the second person to achieve this for his IM title).

IM Felecan worked in a non-chess related occupation until 2011 when he actively became a full-time chess coach for youth and adult players.

On the March 2013 FIDE list his Elo rating was 2375. In 2016, he tied for first in the Chicago Open Under-2400 section beating Grandmasters Eugene Perelshteyn and Holden Hernandez in the process. His 6/9 result was the best result for any player in the state of Illinois.
