= Levitsky versus Marshall =

Famous chess game played in 1912

Game animation

Levitsky versus Marshall, also known as the Gold Coins Game, is a chess game that was played in Breslau (now Wrocław) on July 20, 1912, during the master's tournament of the DSB Congress, between the Russian master Stepan Levitsky and the leading American player of the time, Frank Marshall. It is famous for Marshall's remarkable winning move 23...Qg3!!, placing the queen en prise three different ways but leaving White with no defence. Levitsky resigned in response to this move. According to legend, after Marshall's winning move, gold coins were tossed onto the board by spectators, although this has been contested by other accounts, including by Marshall's wife who was present at the time.

== Game summary ==
After the game started with the French Defence with the addition of Marshall’s own variation to the opening (known as the French Defence, Marshall Variation), Levitsky made some suboptimal moves, and then a big mistake allowing Marshall to win a piece. Levitsky tried to counterattack with Rc5, but Marshall's winning move put his queen—his most valuable piece—on a square where it could be captured by three of Levitsky's pieces. Legend says that this move immediately triggered a shower of gold.

=== The "shower of gold" ===
It is unclear whether the legend that the winning queen move triggered a shower of gold coins is true. Marshall insisted that "the spectators ... threw gold pieces on [his] board at the conclusion of [his] brilliant win over Levitsky", but Israel Horowitz reported that "Marshall's wife, Caroline, disclaims even a shower of pennies." Eric Schiller wrote, "others say they were just paying off their wagers."

== The game ==
White: Stepan Levitsky Black: Frank Marshall Opening: French Defence (ECO C10)
Tournament: DSB Congress XVIII 1912

1. d4 e6 2. e4 d5 3. Nc3 c5?!

A theoretically suspect line, favored by Marshall at the time but now largely abandoned. White should play 4.exd5 exd5 5.dxc5 d4 6.Ne4, and Black will struggle to regain the pawn. But Levitsky's 4.Nf3 is reasonable.

4. Nf3 Nc6 5. exd5 exd5 6. Be2 Nf6 7. 0-0 Be7

Levitsky's idea is to make the black bishop move again.

8. Bg5 0-0 9. dxc5 Be6 10. Nd4 Bxc5 11. Nxe6

Pete Tamburro is highly critical of this move, which exchanges the knight for the bishop, saying, "Marshall has an open line for his king rook, and he will threaten e5 with a beautiful center."

11... fxe6 12. Bg4 Qd6 13. Bh3 Rae8 14. Qd2 Bb4

Black pins the knight to White's queen.

15. Bxf6 Rxf6 16. Rad1 Qc5

Increasing the pressure on c3. Levitsky "figures that Black's threatened 17...Bxc3 18.Qxc3 Qxc3 would give him a lost endgame because of the doubled c-pawns, so he decides to make his queen more active [with 17.Qe2]."

17. Qe2 Bxc3 18. bxc3 Qxc3

Black wins a pawn.

19. Rxd5

White regains his pawn, because of the pin on the e-pawn by White's queen (if 19...exd5?? then mate follows: 20.Qxe8+ Rf8 21.Be6+ Kh8 22.Qxf8#).

19... Nd4 20. Qh5?

A better choice would have been 20.Qe4 Rf4 21.Qe5 h6.

20... Ref8

Marshall doubles his rooks on the f-file, and, because he has removed the pin on his pawn, threatens 21...exd5. He also threatens 21...Rxf2 because 22.Rxf2?? would allow 22...Qe1+ 23.Rf1 Qxf1#.

21. Re5

Levitsky moves his rook to a safe square and defends e1, but Tamburro notes that 21...Rxf2 was still possible because 22.Rxf2 loses to 22...Qa1+. Marshall, however, "has a greater treat in store".

21... Rh6 22. Qg5

The placement of the queen means White's g2-pawn is overloaded with preventing the knight fork 22...Nf3+ and defending the bishop, so Marshall wins a piece with his next move.

Position: f8 black rook, g8 black king, a7 black pawn, b7 black pawn, g7 black pawn, h7 black pawn, e6 black pawn, c5 white rook, g5 white queen, d4 black knight, g3 black queen, h3 black rook, a2 white pawn, c2 white pawn, f2 white pawn, g2 white pawn, h2 white pawn, f1 white rook, g1 white king

Position after 23....Qg3!!

22... Rxh3! 23. Rc5 Qg3!! (diagram)

Black moves his queen where it may be captured three ways. Some annotators have given this move three exclamation marks ("!!!"). Tim Krabbé considers it the third-most stunning move of all time.

In his book The Joys of Chess, German writer Christian Hesse took an iconoclastic view, describing 23...Qg3 as "the most... overrated move in the whole history of chess". He pointed out that while 23...Qg3 was indeed the strongest move on the board, a normal queen move such as 23...Qb4 would also leave Black a piece up with an easily winning position, since White cannot capture the rook without losing the queen to ...Nf3+. The main advantage of 23...Qg3 over other queen moves is that it forces an immediate queen exchange. He also noted that once he had thought of it, 23...Qg3 did not require any particularly deep calculation on Marshall's part since the tactics involved are fairly simple, and that similar moves had been seen in earlier games such as Tietz-Maader, Karlsbad 1896, N.N.-Caro, Berlin 1898 and Fox-Bauer, Antwerp 1901.

Black threatens ...Qxh2#. All three ways of capturing the queen lose, and other escape attempts fail as well:
- 24.hxg3 Ne2#
- 24.fxg3 Ne2+ 25.Kh1 Rxf1# (a back-rank mate)
- any move by White's rook on f1 loses to 24...Qxh2+ 25.Kf1 Qh1#
- 24.f4 (or 24.f3) Ne2+ 25.Kh1 Qxh2#
- 24.Qe5 Nf3+ 25.Kh1 Rxh2#
- 24.Qxg3 (relatively best) Ne2+ 25.Kh1 Nxg3+ 26.Kg1 (if 26.fxg3 Rxf1#) Nxf1 27.gxh3 Nd2 with an easily won endgame, or 26...Ne2+ 27.Kh1 followed by moving the rook on h3 away.

0–1

Levitsky resigned.

== See also ==
- List of chess games
