= Polish Immortal =

Early 20th century chess game

Polish Immortal is the name given to a chess game between Glucksberg and Miguel Najdorf played in Warsaw. The game is celebrated because of Black's sacrifice of all four of his minor pieces.

Some sources give the date of this game as 1930 or 1935, and give the name of the player of the white pieces as "Glucksberg". Garry Kasparov gives the date of the game as 1928, and the name of Najdorf's opponent as "Glinksberg", attributing these facts to Najdorf and his daughter.

== The game ==
White: Glucksberg Black: Miguel Najdorf Opening: Dutch Defence (ECO A85)

[Notes based on Kasparov's My Great Predecessors, Part IV, unless otherwise indicated]

1. d4 f5 2. c4 Nf6 3. Nc3 e6 4. Nf3 d5 5. e3

Savielly Tartakower suggests 5.Bf4.

5... c6 6. Bd3 Bd6 7. 0-0 0-0 8. Ne2

Tartakower recommends 8.Ne5 followed by 9.f4, "countering the Stonewall with another Stonewall".

8... Nbd7 9. Ng5?

This move looks like an elementary blunder, losing a pawn, but in fact the position is more complicated than that.

9... Bxh2+! 10. Kh1!?

After 10.Kxh2 Ng4+ 11.Kh1 Qxg5 Black is up a pawn for nothing. After 10.Kh1, White threatens both Nxe6, winning material, or to trap Black's bishop with g3 or f4.

10... Ng4! 11. f4

Defending White's knight on g5 and cutting off the escape route of Black's bishop; not 11.Nxe6? Qh4!

Position: a8 black rook, c8 black bishop, f8 black rook, g8 black king, a7 black pawn, b7 black pawn, d7 black knight, g7 black pawn, h7 black pawn, c6 black pawn, e6 black pawn, d5 black pawn, f5 black pawn, g5 white knight, h5 black queen, c4 white pawn, d4 white pawn, f4 white pawn, g4 black knight, d3 white bishop, e3 white pawn, g3 white pawn, a2 white pawn, b2 white pawn, e2 white knight, g2 white king, h2 black bishop, a1 white rook, c1 white bishop, d1 white queen, f1 white rook

Position after 13.Kg2; Black begins a series of sacrifices to hunt White's king.

11... Qe8 12. g3 Qh5 13. Kg2 (see diagram)

White has surrounded Black's bishop and threatens to win it with Rh1, Nf3, and Nxh2.

13... Bg1!!

Sacrificing the bishop in order to continue the attack on White's king.

14. Nxg1

Not 14.Kxg1? Qh2#, or 14.Rxg1? Qh2+ and 15...Qf2#.

14... Qh2+ 15. Kf3 e5! 16. dxe5 Ndxe5+ 17. fxe5 Nxe5+ 18. Kf4 Ng6+ 19. Kf3 f4!!

Threatening both 20...Ne5# and 20...Bg4+.

20. exf4

If 20.Bxg6 then 20...Bg4+ 21.Kxg4 Qxg3+ 22.Kh5 hxg6+ 23.Kxg6 Rf6+ 24.Kh5 Rh6#.

20... Bg4+!! 21. Kxg4 Ne5+! 22. fxe5 h5# 0–1

Position: a8 black rook, f8 black rook, g8 black king, a7 black pawn, b7 black pawn, g7 black pawn, c6 black pawn, d5 black pawn, e5 white pawn, g5 white knight, h5 black pawn, c4 white pawn, g4 white king, d3 white bishop, g3 white pawn, a2 white pawn, b2 white pawn, h2 black queen, a1 white rook, c1 white bishop, d1 white queen, f1 white rook, g1 white knight

Final position after 22...h5#

== See also ==
- Peruvian Immortal
- Uruguayan Immortal
