= Carl Hamppe =

Swiss-Austrian chess player (1814–1876)

Carl Hamppe (1814 in Switzerland – 17 May 1876, in Gersau, Canton of Schwyz) was a senior government official in Vienna as well as a Swiss-Austrian chess master and theoretician.

He played matches with Johann Löwenthal (4 : 5) in 1846, Ernst Falkbeer (16 : 15) in 1850, and Daniel Harrwitz (2 : 5) in 1852 and (½ : 3½) in 1860.

Hamppe twice won the Vienna championship (Wiener Schachgesellschaft) in 1859 and 1860, both times ahead of Wilhelm Steinitz.

His most famous game was the "Immortal Draw" (Carl Hamppe vs. Philipp Meitner, Vienna 1872).

He made contributions to the Vienna Game (1.e4 e5 2.Nc3), and two variations in the Vienna Gambit: Hamppe–Allgaier Gambit (1.e4 e5 2.Nc3 Nc6 3.f4 exf4 4.Nf3 g5 5.h4 g4 6.Ng5) and Hamppe–Muzio Gambit (1.e4 e5 2.Nc3 Nc6 3.f4 exf4 4.Nf3 g5 5.Bc4 g4 6.0-0 gxf3 7.Qxf3).

== See also ==
- List of chess games
