= Rotlewi versus Rubinstein =

1907 chess game

Animation of the game

Rotlewi versus Rubinstein is a game of chess played between Gersz Rotlewi and Akiba Rubinstein in Łódź, Poland on December 26, 1907. It features a brilliant queen and rook sacrifice by Rubinstein to force mate.

The game was dubbed Rubinstein's Immortal Game by Hans Kmoch. Garry Kasparov described the game as "Rubinstein's truly 'immortal' game" and "his most famous creation".

== The game ==
White: Gersz Rotlewi Black: Akiba Rubinstein Opening: Tarrasch Defense, Symmetrical Variation (ECO D32)
Łódź, Poland, December 1907

[Notes are based on The Big Book of Chess by Eric Schiller, and other referenced works.]

1. d4 d5 2. Nf3 e6 3. e3 c5 4. c4 Nc6 5. Nc3 Nf6 6. dxc5 Bxc5 7. a3 a6 8. b4 Bd6 9. Bb2 0-0 10. Qd2?

Tartakower criticizes this as a loss of time: "The queen will soon have to seek a better square. The most useful move is 10.Qc2."

10... Qe7!

This move sacrifices a pawn, but 11.cxd5 exd5 12.Nxd5? accepting the sacrifice allows 12...Nxd5 13.Qxd5 Rd8! with a strong attack.

11. Bd3 dxc4 12. Bxc4 b5 13. Bd3 Rd8 14. Qe2 Bb7 15. 0-0 Ne5 16. Nxe5 Bxe5

Threatening to win a pawn by 17...Bxh2+! since 18.Kxh2 allows the fork 18...Qd6+ followed by 19...Qxd3.

17. f4 Bc7 18. e4 Rac8 19. e5 Bb6+ 20. Kh1 Ng4

Black is trying to attack White's kingside. Both bishops, the knight, and soon the queen are attacking squares near White's king.

Position: c8 black rook, d8 black rook, g8 black king, b7 black bishop, f7 black pawn, g7 black pawn, h7 black pawn, a6 black pawn, b6 black bishop, e6 black pawn, b5 black pawn, e5 white pawn, b4 white pawn, e4 white bishop, f4 white pawn, g4 black knight, h4 black queen, a3 white pawn, c3 white knight, g3 white pawn, b2 white bishop, e2 white queen, h2 white pawn, a1 white rook, f1 white rook, h1 white king

Position after 22.g3. Black is about to unleash 22...Rxc3!!

21. Be4 Qh4 22. g3 (see diagram) Rxc3!!

White's bishop on e4 is defended by both his queen and knight, but his queen must also defend h2 against ...Qxh2#. Black sacrifices to remove the knight, causing White's queen to be overloaded defending both e4 and h2. Chernev wrote "It's only the beginning. You ain't seen nothin' yet. Kmoch gives this move three exclamation marks. We can hardly do less."

23. gxh4

White has little choice but to accept the sacrifice of Black's queen, since 23.Bxc3 and most other moves lose to 23...Bxe4+ 24.Qxe4 Qxh2#, and 23.Bxb7 loses to 23...Rxg3.

23... Rd2!! (diagram)

Position: g8 black king, b7 black bishop, f7 black pawn, g7 black pawn, h7 black pawn, a6 black pawn, b6 black bishop, e6 black pawn, b5 black pawn, e5 white pawn, b4 white pawn, e4 white bishop, f4 white pawn, g4 black knight, h4 white pawn, a3 white pawn, c3 black rook, b2 white bishop, d2 black rook, e2 white queen, h2 white pawn, a1 white rook, f1 white rook, h1 white king

Position after 23...Rd2!!

Black deflects White's queen from defending the bishop on e4 by sacrificing a rook in addition to the queen. White has to take the rook because White's queen is pinned against the h2-square, for example:
- 24.Qe1 Rxh2#
- 24.Qxg4 Bxe4+ 25.Rf3 Rxf3 (threatening 26...Rf1#)
  - 26.Qxf3 Bxf3#
  - 26.Qg2 Rf1+! 27.Rxf1 Bxg2#
- 24.Rfe1 or 24.Rae1 lose to 24...Bxe4+ 25.Qxe4 Rxh2#
- 24.Bxb7 Rxe2 25. Bg2 (forced) Rh3 and ...Rxh2#

24. Qxd2 Bxe4+ 25. Qg2 Rh3! 0–1

Black ignores the fact he can take White's queen and instead forces mate soon by ...Rxh2#, despite being down in material by a queen and rook for two minor pieces. White resigns.

Position: g8 black king, f7 black pawn, g7 black pawn, h7 black pawn, a6 black pawn, b6 black bishop, e6 black pawn, b5 black pawn, e5 white pawn, b4 white pawn, e4 black bishop, f4 white pawn, g4 black knight, h4 white pawn, a3 white pawn, h3 black rook, b2 white bishop, g2 white queen, h2 white pawn, a1 white rook, f1 white rook, h1 white king

Final position after 25...Rh3!

== See also ==
- List of chess games
