= Carlsen versus Nepomniachtchi, World Chess Championship 2021, Game 6 =

Overview of game 6 in 2021 World Chess championship

Position: d8 black king, f7 white rook, g7 white knight, e6 white pawn, f5 white pawn, h4 white king, g1 black queen

The final position in which Nepomniachtchi (Black) resigned after Carlsen (White) played 136. Ng7. From here, White's king can proceed towards g8, where it is protected from further queen harassment. Pawn promotion would soon follow.

On 3 December 2021, in the sixth game of the World Chess Championship 2021, the defending world champion Magnus Carlsen (as White) defeated the challenger Ian Nepomniachtchi in 136 moves, which made it the longest game in the history of the World Chess Championship. The game was played in 7 hours and 45 minutes, finishing after midnight local time, to take Carlsen to a 3½–2½ lead in the best-of-14-game match.

It was the first classical game in a World Chess Championship in more than five years that did not end in a draw; after Magnus Carlsen won the tenth game of the World Chess Championship 2016 against Sergey Karjakin to level the score, there was the longest-ever streak of 19 draws in consecutive World Chess Championship classical games (games 11–12 in 2016, games 1–12 in 2018, games 1–5 in 2021). The game was widely praised, with chess players and commentators describing it as "epic" and an "all-time classic".

The game proved to be the turning point in the match. After the loss, Nepomniachtchi's play declined significantly from being on par with Carlsen to highly error-prone, with Carlsen ultimately retaining his title by 7½–3½.

== Background ==
By winning the Candidates Tournament 2020–21, Ian Nepomniachtchi earned the right to challenge the defending world champion Magnus Carlsen in the World Chess Championship 2021, which was held during Expo 2020 at Dubai Exhibition Centre in Dubai, United Arab Emirates, between 24 November and 10 December 2021. For the first time, Carlsen was challenged for the title by a player with a positive head-to-head record in classical games against him (4–1 with eight draws) before the start of the match.

The first five games of the match all ended in draws. Early in the match, some commentators thought that both players were too good to lose a game.

The time control for the game was 120 minutes per side for the first 40 moves, 60 minutes for the next 20 moves, and 15 minutes for the rest of the game, with a 30-second increment per move starting with move 61.

== The game ==
Magnus Carlsen, having the White pieces, opened with Queen's Pawn Game, Symmetrical Variation, Pseudo-Catalan (ECO D02):

1. d4 Nf6 2. Nf3 d5 3. g3

With this move order, White aims for a Catalan-like setup, except the move c4 is delayed.

3... e6 4. Bg2 Be7 5. O-O O-O 6. b3

White's point is to side-step the main line with 6. c4, which was played in the second game of the match.

6... c5 7. dxc5 Bxc5 8. c4 dxc4 9. Qc2

This move, pinning the pawn c4, delays re-capturing on c4 and avoids a queen exchange.

9... Qe7 10. Nbd2!? Nc6!

White wants to sacrifice a pawn, but Black does not accept and goes for rapid development.

11. Nxc4 b5 12. Nce5 Nb4 13. Qb2 Bb7 14. a3 Nc6 15. Nd3 Bb6 16. Bg5 Rfd8 17. Bxf6 gxf6

Black avoids a queen exchange even though that would be fine. In a resulting endgame, White could claim a "good" knight on d3 versus a potentially "bad" bishop, but the black pieces are active and the bishop on b6 would be nicely placed.

18. Rac1 Nd4 19. Nxd4 Bxd4 20. Qa2 Bxg2 21. Kxg2 Qb7+ 22. Kg1 Qe4 23. Qc2 a5 24. Rfd1 Kg7 25. Rd2

A more ambitious move was 25. e3 because the bishop does not have a comfortable retreating square and 25...Be5 26. Qe2 Bd6 27. Nc5! gives White a risk-free option to press.

25... Rac8 26. Qxc8 Rxc8 27. Rxc8 Qd5 28. b4 a4 29. e3 Be5?!

Black could have gone for an easy draw with 29...Bb2.

30. h4 h5 31. Kh2 Bb2?

Now the idea of putting the bishop on b2, which was a bail-out option for Black a couple of moves ago, suddenly loses.

32. Rc5 Qd6 33. Rd1?

Under time pressure, Carlsen does not exploit the winning chance, which was hard to spot and calculate, and goes for a continuation which gives up a pawn.

Position: d7 black queen, f7 black pawn, g7 black king, f6 black pawn, e5 black pawn, h5 black pawn, a4 black pawn, b4 white pawn, h4 white pawn, a3 black bishop, d3 white knight, e3 white pawn, g3 white pawn, c2 white rook, f2 white pawn, h2 white king, d1 white rook

In this position, Nepomniachtchi played 36...Qd5?. Instead, 36...Bxb4 would have given him a promising endgame.

33... Bxa3 34. Rxb5 Qd7 35. Rc5 e5 36. Rc2? (diagram) Qd5??

Black had a couple of opportunities to capture the hanging b4-pawn before White connected his rooks.

37. Rdd2 Qb3 38. Ra2 e4 39. Nc5 Qxb4 40. Nxe4?

Carlsen managed to survive the time trouble and get a promising position; however, 40. Rdc2!! would have won the a4-pawn and resulted in a winning endgame.

40... Qb3 41. Rac2 Bf8 42. Nc5 Qb5 43. Nd3 a3 44. Nf4 Qa5 45. Ra2 Bb4 46. Rd3 Kh6 47. Rd1 Qa4 48. Rda1 Bd6 49. Kg1 Qb3 50. Ne2 Qd3 51. Nd4 Kh7 52. Kh2 Qe4?!

Black chooses to give up his a-pawn for White's h-pawn, which will give him a difficult position to defend.

53. Rxa3 Qxh4+ 54. Kg1 Qe4 55. Ra4 Be5 56. Ne2 Qc2 57. R1a2 Qb3 58. Kg2 Qd5+ 59. f3

This move weakens the e3-pawn and gives Black an opportunity to tie White's pieces to defending it.

59... Qd1 60. f4 Bc7 61. Kf2 Bb6 62. Ra1 Qb3 63. Re4 Kg7 64. Re8 f5 65. Raa8 Qb4 66. Rac8 Ba5 67. Rc1 Bb6 68. Re5 Qb3 69. Re8 Qd5 70. Rcc8 Qh1 71. Rc1 Qd5 72. Rb1 Ba7 73. Re7 Bc5 74. Re5 Qd3 75. Rb7 Qc2 76. Rb5 Ba7 77. Ra5 Bb6 78. Rab5 Ba7 79. Rxf5 Qd3 80. Rxf7+ Kxf7 81. Rb7+ Kg6 82. Rxa7

Anish Giri's analysis described the position as "terribly unpleasant" for Black, though stating that it could be held. White faces no serious threat of losing to Black's queen, and can therefore continue pushing toward pawn promotion with little risk, forcing Black to consistently defend accurately to prevent this. Nepomniachtchi initially manages to prevent further White progress for 28 moves.

Position: e8 black king, e5 white pawn, f5 white rook, f4 white pawn, g3 white knight, h3 white king, a2 black queen

According to seven-piece endgame tablebases, this was a drawn endgame until, in this position, Nepomniachtchi played 130...Qe6?.

82... Qd5 83. Ra6+ Kh7 84. Ra1 Kg6 85. Nd4 Qb7 86. Ra2 Qh1 87. Ra6+ Kf7 88. Nf3 Qb1 89. Rd6 Kg7 90. Rd5 Qa2+ 91. Rd2 Qb1 92. Re2 Qb6 93. Rc2 Qb1 94. Nd4 Qh1 95. Rc7+ Kf6 96. Rc6+ Kf7 97. Nf3 Qb1 98. Ng5+ Kg7 99. Ne6+ Kf7 100. Nd4 Qh1 101. Rc7+ Kf6 102. Nf3 Qb1 103. Rd7 Qb2+ 104. Rd2 Qb1 105. Ng1 Qb4 106. Rd1 Qb3 107. Rd6+ Kg7 108. Rd4 Qb2+ 109. Ne2 Qb1

Finally, with the Ne2 and the Rd4 protecting the king well, White can make progress again by pushing the e-pawn.

110. e4 Qh1 111. Rd7+ Kg8 112. Rd4 Qh2+ 113. Ke3 h4 114. gxh4 Qh3+ 115. Kd2 Qxh4 116. Rd3 Kf8 117. Rf3 Qd8+ 118. Ke3

Carlsen said it was important to bring the knight to g3.

118... Qa5 119. Kf2 Qa7+ 120. Re3

The recent developments give some hopes for White because putting his knight on g3 and king on f3 allow him to push his connected pawns forward.

120... Qd7 121. Ng3 Qd2+ 122. Kf3 Qd1+ 123. Re2 Qb3+ 124. Kg2 Qb7 125. Rd2 Qb3 126. Rd5 Ke7 127. Re5+ Kf7 128. Rf5+ Ke8 129. e5 Qa2+ 130. Kh3 Qe6? (diagram)

This was the losing move according to the endgame tablebases. The queen should have remained behind the pawns in order to hold the position (130...Qc2 or 130...Qb1 was still holding). Now all the White pieces move forward in a coordinated and decisive way.

131. Kh4 Qh6+ 132. Nh5 Qh7 133. e6!

The rook cannot be taken because of the royal fork with Ng7+.

133... Qg6 134. Rf7 Kd8 135. f5 Qg1 136. Ng7 1–0

After 136. Ng7, Black could have prolonged the game with series of checks, but White’s king would have found refuge on g8. With White's pawns close to promotion at the far end of the board, Black resigned after 136 moves.

== Computer analysis ==
Once Black captured White's h-pawn in the 115th move, only seven pieces remained on the board, and the game could be found in endgame tablebases as a theoretical draw. However, it does not mean that the draw is easily achievable for a human. Nepomniachtchi had to carefully find the right moves in order to hold the draw, while Carlsen was playing essentially without any risk. Nepomniachtchi made the decisive mistake with 130... Qe6?, which leads to a forced mate in 60 according to the computer analysis.

== Records ==
With the win, Carlsen took a 3½–2½ lead in the best-of-14-game match. It was the first classical game in a World Chess Championship in over five years that did not end in a draw; after Carlsen won the tenth game of the World Chess Championship 2016 against Sergey Karjakin to level the score, there was the longest-ever streak of 19 draws in consecutive World Chess Championship classical games (games 11–12 in 2016, games 1–12 in 2018, games 1–5 in 2021).

The game lasted for seven hours and forty-five minutes. After Nepomniachtchi resigned following Carlsen's 136th move, it became the longest game in the 135-year history of the World Chess Championship. The previous record for the longest game had been game 5 of the World Chess Championship 1978 played between Viktor Korchnoi and Anatoly Karpov, which was a 124-move draw. The longest decisive game up to that point had been game 16 of the World Chess Championship 1990, where Garry Kasparov defeated Karpov in 102 moves.

== Reactions ==
The players discussed the game immediately after its finish and seemingly agreed that the objective result should have been a draw. In the press conference after the game, Carlsen compared it with the tenth game of the World Chess Championship 2016 which he won against Sergey Karjakin and said: "Obviously I'm elated to get this result. It was never easy. Frankly it shouldn't be. There was a lot of the same emotions as the game that I won against Karjakin (in Game 10 of the 2016 world championship), which was a marathon there as well. Obviously this is huge." Nepomniachtchi said that he felt it was reasonable to play for more than a draw in the game but admitted that the move 52...Qe4 was unnecessary. On the result, he added: "Anyway I would say that Magnus managed to capitalise on the very few chances he got. He got this game so that's very nice for him."

Former world champion Garry Kasparov praised the game and saw it as refuting the stereotypes that "chess isn't a sport", "that physical condition isn't so important", or that "classical chess is dead". Former world champion challenger Nigel Short described the game as "epic" and called Carlsen's effort in the game "stupendous". His opinion was shared by chess historian Olimpiu G. Urcan, who added that the game itself was longer than all seven episodes of Netflix's mini-series The Queen's Gambit. The New York Times called game 6 "the breakthrough that blew open the contest" and "an epic struggle that rewrote the chess record books." The Guardian called the game "a heart-pounding psychodrama worthy of the sprawling canvas only the classical format can provide."

== Impact and aftermath ==
Game 6 ended up being the turning point in the match. Nepomniachtchi had played solidly with five draws in the first five games; however, after his game 6 loss, he made blunders in three of the remaining games and eventually lost the match, 7½–3½. FiveThirtyEight mentioned that it was "the most lopsided championship in recent memory", while calling game 6 an "instant classic".

After taking the lead in the match as a result of his win in game 6, Carlsen went on to win the eighth game of the match, the next one he played as White, as Nepomniachtchi blundered a pawn with 21...b5?? and ended up in a desperate position. Following the game, Carlsen called on the sixth game to explain his opponent's blunder and said: "To be honest, this second win probably doesn't come without the first, so everything is kind of connected."

The match continued one-sidedly as Carlsen followed up with two other wins in the ninth and eleventh games, both of which he played as Black, again capitalising on his opponent's blunder in each of them. After Carlsen's third win in game 9, former world champion Viswanathan Anand noted that "in the first five games, Ian was able to match up to this and cope pretty well... but in game six it seemed that psychologically he collapsed first, and Magnus has been rampaging after that." Ultimately, Carlsen won the match by a final score of 7½–3½, winning four games, drawing seven and losing none, to claim his fifth World Chess Championship title.

The New Yorker praised Carlsen's play: "Watching [Carlsen] in this World Championship, though, he struck me as more superhuman than ever, not only for his vision over the board but for his mental stamina. Game 6 had been as even as possible, and yet he had turned it into a series of cascading advantages. As Carlsen made steady, calculated moves, Nepomniachtchi seemed to unravel." In an interview immediately after retaining the title, Carlsen said: "But we really shouldn't forget the fact that this match really, really turned on the sixth game."

== See also ==
- List of chess games
- List of world records in chess
