= Uruguayan Immortal =

The Uruguayan Immortal is a game of chess played in the 1943 Uruguayan Chess Championship between B. Molinari and Luis Roux Cabral. The game is famous for the brilliant combination play by Cabral, who would become a two-time Uruguayan champion (1948 and 1971).

== The game ==
White: Molinari Black: Cabral Opening: Semi-Slav Defense, Meran Variation (ECO D48)

Position: g8 black king, f7 black pawn, g7 black pawn, h7 black pawn, e6 black pawn, a5 black pawn, c5 black bishop, e5 black knight, h5 black queen, a4 white pawn, b4 black pawn, c4 white pawn, e4 white pawn, f3 black bishop, h3 white pawn, e2 white bishop, f2 white bishop, a1 white rook, e1 white rook, f1 white queen, g1 white king

After 30.Bxf2. Black mates in six.

1. d4 Nf6 2. Nf3 d5 3. c4 c6 4. Nc3 Nbd7 5. e3 e6 6. Bd3 dxc4 7. Bxc4 b5 8. Bd3 a6 9. 0-0 c5 10. b3 Bb7 11. Qe2 Qb6 12. Rd1 Be7 13. a4 b4 14. Nb1 Rc8 15. Nbd2 cxd4 16. Nc4 Qa7 17. Nxd4 0-0 18. Bd2 a5 19. Nb5 Qa8 20. Nbd6 Bxg2 21. Nxc8 Rxc8 22. Re1 Bf3 23. Qf1 Qd5 24. e4 Rxc4 25. bxc4 Qh5 26. Bf4 Ng4 27. Be2 Nde5 28. h3 Bc5 29. Bg3 Nxf2 30. Bxf2 (see diagram) Qg5+ 31. Kh2 Qf4+ 32. Bg3 Bg1+ 33. Qxg1 Ng4+

Cabral is two rooks down and his queen and knight are en prise, yet Molinari is helpless to stop checkmate.

0–1 White resigns.

Position: g8 black king, f7 black pawn, g7 black pawn, h7 black pawn, e6 black pawn, a5 black pawn, a4 white pawn, b4 black pawn, c4 white pawn, e4 white pawn, f4 black queen, g4 black knight, f3 black bishop, g3 white bishop, h3 white pawn, e2 white bishop, h2 white king, a1 white rook, e1 white rook, g1 white queen

Final position after 33...Ng4+

Fred Reinfeld annotated the game in the Chess Correspondent, May–June 1944, pages 11–12. His final remark was: "A game destined for immortality."

== See also ==
- Peruvian Immortal
- Polish Immortal
