= Luis Roux Cabral =

Uruguayan chess player

Luis Lisandro Roux Cabral (17 November 1913 - 1973) was a Uruguayan chess master. He was born in Montevideo.

== Chess career ==
He won the Uruguayan Chess Championship twice, in 1948 and 1971, and played for Uruguay in the Chess Olympiads of 1939, 1964 and 1966.

== "The Uruguayan Immortal" ==
In the Uruguay Championship of 1943, Roux Cabral defeated B. Molinari with a brilliant sacrificial attack; the combination is known as "The Uruguayan Immortal". Fred Reinfeld annotated the game on pages 11–12 of the Chess Correspondent, May–June 1944. His final remark was: "A game destined for immortality."
