= Philipp Meitner =

Austrian lawyer and chess player (1839–1910)

Philipp Meitner (24 August 1839, Všechovice (German: Wschechowitz bei Keltsch) – 9 December 1910, Vienna) was an Austrian lawyer and chess master. His most famous game was the "Immortal Draw" (Carl Hamppe vs Philipp Meitner, Vienna 1872). He won at Vienna 1875, and won a match against Adolf Schwarz (6½–3½) at Vienna 1878.

Meitner played in two strong international tournaments in Vienna in 1873 and Vienna in 1882. He tied for 7–8th in the first tournament (Wilhelm Steinitz and Joseph Henry Blackburne won), and took 14th in the second one (Wilhelm Steinitz and Szymon Winawer won). He also tied for 8–9th at Vienna 1882 (Vincenz Hruby won), took 8th at Vienna 1895 (Georg Marco won), took 4th at Vienna 1908 (Richard Réti won), and tied for 6–7th at Vienna 1909/1910 (Trebitsch Memorial, Réti won).

Meitner studied at the Vienna Polytechnic, and William Steinitz was a fellow student.

Philipp Meitner was the father of Lise Meitner.

== See also ==
- List of chess games
