= Kasparov's Immortal =

Chess game played by Garry Kasparov

Game animation

Kasparov's immortal is a chess game played by Garry Kasparov as White against Veselin Topalov as Black at the Hoogovens Wijk aan Zee Chess Tournament 1999 chess tournament. This is one of Kasparov's most famous games; it is considered a masterpiece and Chess.com has listed it as the No. 1 chess game ever played.

== The game ==
White: Kasparov Black: Topalov Opening: Pirc Defense (ECO B07)

1. e4 d6

An unusual response by Topalov to Kasparov's 1. e4, resulting in a position Kasparov had never seen before in classical play.

2. d4 Nf6 3. Nc3 g6

This setup has similarities to the King's Indian Defence, but White's c-pawn remains on the second rank.

4. Be3 Bg7 5. Qd2 c6!?

Topalov plays flexibly, waiting to see how Kasparov will continue.

Position: a8 black rook, c8 black bishop, d8 black queen, e8 black king, h8 black rook, a7 black pawn, d7 black knight, e7 black pawn, f7 black pawn, h7 black pawn, c6 black pawn, d6 black pawn, f6 black knight, g6 black pawn, h6 white queen, b5 black pawn, d4 white pawn, e4 white pawn, c3 white knight, f3 white pawn, a2 white pawn, b2 white pawn, c2 white pawn, e2 white knight, g2 white pawn, h2 white pawn, a1 white rook, e1 white king, f1 white bishop, h1 white rook

Position after 9. Qxh6

6. f3 b5 7. Nge2 Nbd7 8. Bh6 Bxh6 9. Qxh6

This queen capture hinders Black's castling.

9...Bb7 10. a3 e5 11. O-O-O Qe7 12. Kb1!

White's king moves to the safer b1 square and allows the white knight to access the c1 square.

12...a6 13. Nc1 O-O-O 14. Nb3 exd4!

This opens Black's position.

15. Rxd4 c5 16. Rd1 Nb6 17. g3 Kb8 18. Na5 Ba8 19. Bh3?!

The bishop has no targets on h3 and this move allows black to break at the center. It would have been better to recentralize with Qf4.

19...d5 20. Qf4+ Ka7 21. Rhe1 d4 22. Nd5!

If Black plays 22…Nfxd5?, White responds with 23. exd5 Qd6 24. Qxf7+ which leads to White being up a piece, e.g. 24…Kb8 25. Re6 Qc7 26. Re7 Nd7 27. Nc6 Bxc6 28. dxc6 Qxc6 29. Bxd7.

Position: a8 black bishop, d8 black rook, h8 black rook, a7 black king, f7 black pawn, h7 black pawn, a6 black pawn, d6 black queen, f6 black knight, g6 black pawn, a5 white knight, b5 black pawn, c5 black pawn, d5 white pawn, d4 white rook, f4 white queen, a3 white pawn, f3 white pawn, g3 white pawn, h3 white bishop, b2 white pawn, c2 white pawn, h2 white pawn, b1 white king, e1 white rook

The position after 24.Rxd4

22...Nbxd5 23. exd5 Qd6 24. Rxd4!!

Now the fireworks start.

24...cxd4

While Black would have been better off declining the rook sacrifice with Kb6!, the game would have been largely forgotten.

Topalov has said that he took the rook because he found the sacrifice "very interesting", but years later felt accepting the sacrifice was "suicide".

Black can not reply with Nxd5 because White could have then played Qxf7+.

25. Re7+!! Kb6

Position: a8 black bishop, d8 black rook, h8 black rook, a7 black king, e7 black queen, f7 black pawn, h7 black pawn, a6 black pawn, f6 black knight, g6 black pawn, a5 white knight, b5 black pawn, d5 white pawn, d4 black pawn, f4 white queen, a3 white pawn, f3 white pawn, g3 white pawn, h3 white bishop, b2 white pawn, c2 white pawn, h2 white pawn, b1 white king

Analysis of 25…Qxe7? White to move and deliver mate

If Black played 25…Qxe7?, White plays 26. Qxd4+ to start one of the three forced mating sequences:
- 26…Kb8 27. Qb6+ Bb7 28. Nc6+ Ka8 29. Qa7#
- 26…Kb8 27. Qb6+ Qb7 28. Nc6#
- 26…Qc5 27. Qxc5+ Kb8 28. Qb6+ Bb7 29. Qxb7#

26. Qxd4+!

This sacrifices a knight to continue the attack.

Position: a8 black bishop, d8 black rook, h8 black rook, e7 white rook, f7 black pawn, h7 black pawn, a6 black pawn, d6 black queen, f6 black knight, g6 black pawn, b5 black pawn, d5 white pawn, a4 black king, b4 white pawn, d4 white queen, a3 white pawn, f3 white pawn, g3 white pawn, h3 white bishop, c2 white pawn, h2 white pawn, b1 white king

Position after 27… Ka4

26...Kxa5 27. b4+ Ka4 28. Qc3?!

Lubomir Kavalek, writing for The Washington Post, was the first one to observe that Ra7!! is a better attack for White in this position.

28...Qxd5

28...Bxd5?? is refuted with 29. Kb2 followed by Qb3+ and cxb3#.

29. Ra7 Bb7 30. Rxb7 Qc4!

This move forces the white queen to move away temporarily.

After the game, Topalov analyzed the position with his second Silvio Danailov for hours and told the press at the tournament that Black had drawing chances after 30…Rhe8 31. Rb6 Ra8 32. Be6. However, Black is in trouble if White instead plays 32. Bf1!!.

If Black played 30…Qxb7??, 31. Qb3# follows.

31. Qxf6 Kxa3?!

Black takes the pawn to prevent checkmate from 32. Qxa6#.

However, Black had much better drawing chances with 31…Rd1+! During the game, Kasparov visualizing this line saw White having a stronger endgame after 32. Kb2 Ra8 33. Qb6 Qd4+ 34. Qxd4 Rxd4 35. Rxf7 a5 36. Be6 axb4 37. Bb3+ Ka5 38. axb4+ Kb6 39. Rxh7 but realized, after the game was over, that Black could have fought for a draw with 39…Rf8. Computer analysis shows no clear win for White after 39…Rf8, but also shows White had better fighting chances after 35. Bd7 Rd6 36. g4 in a line very hard for humans to visualize.

Position: d8 black rook, h8 black rook, b7 white rook, f7 black pawn, h7 black pawn, g6 black pawn, b5 black pawn, c4 black queen, f3 white pawn, g3 white pawn, h3 white bishop, b2 white queen, h2 white pawn, b1 white king, d1 black king

Position after 35…Kd1 White to move and win

32. Qxa6+ Kxb4 33. c3+ Kxc3 34. Qa1+ Kd2 35. Qb2+ Kd1

White gives checks to invite Black's king into White's back rank.

36. Bf1!! Rd2

If Black plays 36… Qxf1??, White can force mate: 37. Qc2+ Ke1 38. Re7+ Qe2 39. Qxe2#.

If 36…Qd5??, 37. Qc1# follows.

37. Rd7!!

Pinning Black's rook so that White can capture Black's queen without losing his own, and threatening Qxd2#.

If White plays 37. Qxh8??, 37…Qa2# follows.

If White plays 37. Bxc4?, then Black plays 37…Rxb2+! 38. Kxb2 bxc4 39. Kc3, and the rook endgame is a draw.

37...Rxd7 38. Bxc4 bxc4

If Black attempted to save his h8 rook, White would have won with 39. Qc1#.

Position: h8 white queen, d7 black rook, f7 black pawn, h7 black pawn, g6 black pawn, c4 black pawn, f3 white pawn, g3 white pawn, h2 white pawn, b1 white king, d1 black king

Position after 39. Qxh8

39. Qxh8

White now has a queen for a rook and pawn, and should be easily winning.

Position: a7 white queen, h7 black pawn, g6 black pawn, f5 black pawn, f4 white pawn, c3 black pawn, g3 white pawn, d2 black rook, h2 white pawn, c1 white king, e1 black king

The final position

39...Rd3 40. Qa8 c3 41. Qa4+ Ke1 42. f4 f5 43. Kc1 Rd2 44. Qa7 1-0

Topalov resigned.

As the game ended, Kasparov remembers the audience in the hall applauding.
