= Chess annotation symbols =

Notation indicating the writer's assessment of a chess move

When annotating chess games, commentators frequently use widely recognized annotation symbols. Question marks and exclamation points that denote a move as bad or good are ubiquitous in chess literature. Some publications intended for an international audience, such as the Chess Informant, have a wide range of additional symbols that transcend language barriers.

The common symbols for evaluating the merits of a move are "??", "?", "?!", "!?", "!", and "!!". The chosen symbol is appended to the text describing the move (e.g. Re7? or Kh1!?). These symbols are independent of the notation system being used.

== Evaluation symbols ==
=== Moves ===
Move evaluation symbols, by decreasing severity or increasing effectiveness of the move:

==== ?? (Blunder) ====
The double question mark "??" indicates a blunder, a critically bad mistake. Typical moves that receive double question marks are those that overlook a tactic that wins substantial material, overlook a checkmate, or miss a winning move after a severe mistake by the opponent. A "??"-worthy move may result in an immediately lost position, turn a won position into a draw, lose an important piece or otherwise severely worsen the player's position.

Blunders occur at all levels of play. In fact, one of the most infamous blunders in chess history occurred in the twenty-third game of the 1892 World Chess Championship, which famously came to an abrupt and unexpected end when Mikhail Chigorin hung a mate in two in an otherwise completely winning position.

==== ? (Mistake) ====
A single question mark "?" indicates that the annotator thinks that the move is a mistake and should not have been played. Mistakes often lead to loss of tempo, material, or otherwise a worsening of the player's position. The nature of a mistake may be more strategic or positional than tactical. The symbol can also be used for a move that overlooks a far stronger move.

==== ?! (Dubious move / Inaccuracy) ====
A question mark followed by an exclamation mark "?!" usually indicates that the annotator believes the move to be dubious or questionable but to possibly have merits or be difficult to refute. The "?!" may also indicate that the annotator believes the move is weak, of doubtful value, or deserves criticism but not bad enough to warrant a "?". On certain Internet chess servers, such as Chess.com and Lichess, this kind of move is marked as an "inaccuracy", denoting a weak move, appearing more regularly than with most annotators. A sacrifice leading to a dangerous attack that the opponent should be able to defend against if they play well may receive a "?!". Alternatively, this may denote a move that is objectively bad but sets up an attractive trap.

Expert authors were divided on assigning "?" or "?!" to Bobby Fischer's surprising 29...Bxh2 in the first game of the 1972 World Championship.

==== !? (Interesting move) ====
Similar to "?!" (see above), an exclamation mark followed by a question mark "!?" is one of the most controversial symbols. Different sources have varying definitions, such as "interesting, but perhaps not the best move", "move deserving attention", "speculative move", "enterprising move" or "risky move". Usually it indicates that the move leads to exciting or wild play but that the objective evaluation of the move is unclear. It is also often used when a player sets a cunning trap in a lost position. Typical moves receiving a "!?" are those involving speculative sacrifices or dangerous attacks that might turn out to be unsound.

In Kasparov versus The World, the World team's novelty 10...Qe6!? was given this annotation.

Andrew Soltis jokingly called "!?" the symbol of the lazy annotator who finds a move interesting but cannot be bothered to work out whether it is good or bad.

==== ! (Good move) ====
An exclamation point "!" indicates a good move, especially one that is surprising or requires particular skill. The symbol may also be interpreted as "best move". Annotators are usually somewhat conservative with the use of this symbol; for example, it is not usually awarded to obvious moves that capture material or deliver checkmate.

Reasons for awarding the symbol vary greatly between annotators; among them are strong opening novelties, good psychological opening choices, well-timed breakthroughs, sound sacrifices, moves that set traps in lost positions, moves that avoid such traps, moves that punish mistakes well, sequential moves during brilliancies, and being the only good move that maintains the player's position.

==== !! (Brilliant move) ====
The double exclamation point "!!" is used for outstanding or particularly strong moves, usually difficult-to-find moves that require a high level of skill or calculation. Annotators are generally more conservative and withhold this rating more than they do the "!". Typical moves that receive a double exclamation mark include sound sacrifices of large amounts of material and counter-intuitive moves that prove very powerful, like underpromotion. Endgame swindles sometimes receive the "!!" mark too.

For example, in what is known as the Game of the Century, two moves by 13-year-old Bobby Fischer are typically awarded double exclamation points – 11...Na4!! and 17...Be6!!, knight and queen sacrifices respectively.

==== Unusual symbols ====
The majority of chess writers and editors consider symbols more than two characters long unnecessary. A few writers, however, have used three or more exclamation points ("!!!") for an exceptionally brilliant move, three or more question marks ("???") for an exceptionally bad blunder, or unusual combinations of exclamation points and question marks ("!?!", "?!?" etc.) for particularly unusual, spectacular, controversial or unsound moves.

For example, when annotating Rotlewi–Rubinstein 1907, Hans Kmoch awarded Rubinstein's 22...Rxc3 three exclamation points, as he did Rubinstein's following move 23...Rd2. Annotators have also awarded 23...Qg3, the final move of Levitsky–Marshall 1912 (the "Gold Coins Game"), the "!!!" symbol.

An exceptionally bad blunder that has sometimes been awarded three or more question marks occurred in Deep Fritz–Kramnik 2006, when Kramnik played 34...Qe3, overlooking a mate in one with 35.Qh7#.

==== Parentheses ====
Sometimes annotation symbols are put in parentheses, e.g. "(?)", "(!)". Different writers have used these in different ways.

Ludek Pachman used "(?)" to indicate a move that he considered inferior but that he did not wish to comment on further; Simon Webb used it to indicate a move that is objectively sound, but was in his opinion a poor psychological choice; and Robert Hübner (see below) used it to indicate a move that is inaccurate and makes the player's task more difficult.

When put in parentheses, "(!)" usually indicates a subtlety that demonstrates the player's skill rather than a spectacular move.

== Formalized definitions ==
Some writers choose to take a less subjective or more formalized approach to these symbols.

=== Nunn's convention ===
In his 1992 book Secrets of Rook Endings and other books in the series (Secrets of Minor-Piece Endings and Secrets of Pawnless Endings), John Nunn uses these symbols in a more specific way in the context of endgames where the optimal line of play can be determined with certainty:

Symbol	Meaning
!	The only move that maintains the current evaluation of the position: if the position is theoretically drawn, the only move that does not lose; if the position is theoretically won, the only move that secures the win. The symbol "!" is used regardless how trivial the move in question, the only exception is if it is the only legal move.
!!	A particularly difficult-to-find "!" move.
?	A move that negatively affects the evaluation of the position: if the position had been drawn before the move, it is now lost; if won before the move, it is now drawn or lost.
??	An obviously bad "?" move.
!?	A move that makes the opponent's task harder or one's own task easier; for example, in a theoretically lost position, a move that forces the opponent to find several "!" moves in order to win.
?!	A move that makes the opponent's task easier or one's own task harder; for example, in a theoretically won position, a move that requires several subsequent "!" moves in order to win.

This convention has been used in some later works, such as Fundamental Chess Endings and Secrets of Pawn Endings by Karsten Müller and Frank Lamprecht, but it can be safely assumed the convention is not being used unless there is a specific note otherwise. The Nunn convention cannot be used to annotate full games because the exact evaluation of a position is generally impractical to compute.

In 1959, Euwe and Hooper made the same use of the question mark, "... a decisive error ...".

=== Hübner's approach ===
German grandmaster Robert Hübner prefers an even more specific and restrained use of move evaluation symbols:

I have attached question marks to the moves which change a winning position into a drawn game, or a drawn position into a losing one, according to my judgment; a move which changes a winning game into a losing one deserves two question marks ... I have distributed question marks in brackets to moves which are obviously inaccurate and significantly increase the difficulty of the player's task ... There are no exclamation marks, as they serve no useful purpose. The best move should be mentioned in the analysis in any case; an exclamation mark can only serve to indicate the personal excitement of the commentator.

Symbol	Meaning
?	A move that turns a winning position into a drawn position, or a drawn position into a lost position
??	A move that turns a winning position into a lost position
(?)	An inaccuracy; a move that significantly increases the difficulty of the player's task

=== Chess composition ===
When the solution to a certain chess problem is given, there are also some conventions that have become a common practice:

Symbol	Meaning
!	A key move is marked with at least one "!"
?	A try move
!	A refutation to a try move
?	When dual avoidance is a part of the thematic content of a problem, avoided duals (if listed) are marked with "?"

=== Positions ===
These symbols indicate the strategic balance of the game position:

CP437	Unicode	In brief	Meaning
=		Equal	Even position: White and Black have more or less equal chances.
+/=	⩲	Slight plus for White	Slight advantage: White has slightly better chances.
=/+	⩱	Slight plus for Black	Slight advantage: Black has slightly better chances.
+/−	±	Clear plus for White	Clear advantage: White has the upper hand.
−/+	∓	Clear plus for Black	Clear advantage: Black has the upper hand.
+ −		Decisive advantage for White	White has a winning advantage.
− +		Decisive advantage for Black	Black has a winning advantage.
∞		Unclear	Unclear position: It is unclear who (if anyone) has an advantage. Often used when a position is highly asymmetrical, e.g. Black has a ruined pawn structure but dangerous active piece-play.
=/∞	⯹	Compensation	With compensation: Whoever is down in material has compensation for it. Can also denote a position that is unclear, but appears to the annotator to be approximately equal. Chess Informant has given two distinct glyphs for the same concept: $\stackrel{=}{\infty}$ denotes the circumstance where White has compensation for Black's material advantage, and $\stackrel{\infty}{=}$ denotes the circumstance where Black has compensation for White's material advantage. Both versions are encoded in Unicode as U+2BF9 ⯹ EQUALS SIGN WITH INFINITY BELOW and U+2B96 ⮖ EQUALS SIGN WITH INFINITY ABOVE, respectively.

== Other symbols ==
There are other symbols used by various chess engines and publications, such as Chess Informant and Encyclopaedia of Chess Openings, when annotating moves or describing positions. Many of the symbols now have Unicode encodings, but quite a few still require a special chess font with appropriated characters.

=== Move-related ===
Symbol	In brief	Meaning
⌓	Better	A better move than the one played
□	Only	The only reasonable move, or the only move available
Δ	With the idea...	The future plan this move supports
∇	Countering	The opponent's plan this move defends against
TN or N	Novelty	A theoretical novelty

=== Positions or conditions ===
Symbol	In brief	Meaning
↑	Initiative	An advantage in initiative
→	Attack	With an attack
⇄	Counterplay	The player has counterplay
↻ or ↑↑	Development	A lead in development
○	Space	More space controlled by one player
⊕	Time trouble, aka zeitnot	The player is short on time
⊙	Zugzwang	The player is forced to make a move that will cause their disadvantage
+	Check	The king is under threat of capture in the next turn
++	Double check	A check by two pieces at once
#	Checkmate	A check with no way to escape it; the one that caused it wins

== See also ==
- Algebraic notation (chess) – Method to convey chess moves
- Chess notation – Methods for describing chess moves and/or positions
- Chess symbols in Unicode – Text characters representing chess pieces
- Numeric Annotation Glyphs – Symbols used to annotate chess games when using a computer
