= Desperado (chess) =

Chess maneuver

In chess, a desperado has two different meanings. It can either be a piece that is en prise or trapped, but captures an enemy piece before it is itself captured in order to compensate the loss a little, or a piece that is used as a sacrifice that will result in stalemate if it is captured. The former case can arise in a situation where both sides have hanging pieces, in which case these pieces are used to win material prior to being captured. A desperado in the latter case is usually a rook or a queen; such a piece is sometimes also called "mad" or "crazy" (e.g. crazy rook).

== Examples of the first definition ==
=== Petrosian vs. Fischer ===
Petrosian vs. Fischer, 1958

Position: a8 black rook, c8 black bishop, d8 black queen, f8 black rook, g8 black king, a7 black pawn, b7 black pawn, c7 black pawn, e7 black knight, g7 black bishop, h7 black pawn, d6 black pawn, d5 white pawn, e5 white knight, f5 black pawn, h5 black knight, c4 white pawn, c3 white knight, g3 white pawn, a2 white pawn, b2 white pawn, f2 white pawn, g2 white bishop, h2 white pawn, a1 white rook, c1 white bishop, d1 white queen, f1 white rook, g1 white king

Position after 12.Nxe5

A simple example illustrating the first definition comes from a 1958 game between future world champions Tigran Petrosian and Bobby Fischer (diagram). White had just captured the e5-pawn with his knight on f3. The white knight can be taken, but White's move also opened a discovered attack on the black knight on h5. If Black takes the knight, then 13.Qxh5 leaves him a pawn down. To avoid this, Black sacrificed the h5-knight, capturing a pawn with tempo on the rook:

12... Nxg3 13. hxg3 Bxe5

Fischer later said 13...dxe5 would have been better; the game ended in a draw.

=== Bogoljubow vs. Schmid ===
Bogoljubow vs. Schmid, 1949

Position: a8 black rook, c8 black bishop, d8 black queen, e8 black king, f8 black bishop, h8 black rook, a7 black pawn, b7 black pawn, c7 black pawn, d7 black pawn, f7 black pawn, g7 black pawn, h7 black pawn, c6 black knight, f6 black knight, d4 white knight, e4 white pawn, c3 white knight, a2 white pawn, b2 white pawn, c2 white pawn, f2 white pawn, g2 white pawn, h2 white pawn, a1 white rook, c1 white bishop, d1 white queen, e1 white king, f1 white bishop, h1 white rook

In this position, Schmid played 5...Nxe4!?

A classic example of the first definition is Bogoljubow–Schmid, West German championship, Bad Pyrmont 1949, which began 1. e4 e5 2. Nf3 Nc6 3. Nc3 Nf6 4. d4 exd4 5. Nxd4. In the position shown, Schmid played the surprising novelty 5... Nxe4!?, with the point that 6.Nxe4 would be met by 6...Qe7 7.f3 d5, and Black will regain the sacrificed piece. According to the Encyclopedia of Chess Openings, White can then gain a small advantage with 8.Bb5 Bd7 9.Bxc6 bxc6 10.0-0 dxe4 11.fxe4! g6 (or 11...0-0-0 12.Qf3) 12.Qf3 Bg7 13.c3 0-0 14.Bf4 c5 15.Nb3 Bc6 16.Qg3! Instead of 7.f3, Tartakower and du Mont recommend 7.Nb5 Qxe4+ 8.Be2 Kd8 9.0-0 "with compensations for the mislaid pawn".

Instead, play continued 6. Nxc6 Nxc3! initiating a sequence of desperado moves, where each player keeps capturing with his knight, rather than pausing to capture the opponent's knight. Black cannot pause for 6...bxc6?? 7.Nxe4 Qe7 8.Qe2, leaving White a piece up with a winning position. 7. Nxd8! White must also continue in desperado fashion, since 7.bxc3? bxc6 would leave Black a pawn up. 7... Nxd1 Again the desperado move is forced, since 7...Kxd8?? 8.bxc3 would leave Black a queen down. 8. Nxf7 Since 8.Kxd1 Kxd8 would leave White a pawn down, the knight continues capturing. 8... Nxf2 Still continuing in desperado fashion, in preference to 8...Kxf7 9.Kxd1 with material equality. 9. Nxh8 Nxh1. Between them, the desperado knights have captured thus far two queens, two rooks, two knights, and three pawns. The game continued 10. Bd3 Bc5 11. Bxh7 Nf2 12. Bf4 d6 13. Bg6+ Kf8 14. Bg3 Ng4 15. Nf7? (A better move would be 15.Bd3 followed by Ng6+ "with a probable draw".) 15... Ne3 16. Kd2 Bf5! 17. Ng5?? Bogoljubow probably saw 17.Bxf5 Nxf5 18.Ng5 Be3+ wins, and played Ng5 in desperation; however, 17.Bxf5 Nxf5 18.Rf1 was possible. 17... Bxg6 18. Ne6+ Ke7 19. Nxc5 Nxc2! The desperado knight strikes again, this time with deadly effect. Not 19...dxc5? 20.Kxe3 with equality. 20. Bh4+ Ke8 21. Ne6 Kd7 22. Nf4 Nxa1 23. Nxg6 Re8 24. Bf2 Nc2! 25. Nf4 If 25.Kxc2, Re2+ followed by ...Rxf2 wins. 25... Nb4 The knight departs, having captured in its 13 moves White's queen, both rooks, a knight and three pawns. Its White counterpart captured the queen, a rook, both bishops, a knight, and two pawns in its 14 moves. 0–1

=== Tal vs. Keres ===
Tal vs. Keres, 1962

Position: a8 black rook, c8 black bishop, d8 black queen, f8 black rook, g8 black king, f7 black pawn, g7 black pawn, h7 black pawn, a6 black pawn, d6 black pawn, f6 black bishop, b5 black pawn, e5 black knight, d4 white knight, e4 white pawn, a3 white pawn, h3 white pawn, b2 white pawn, c2 white bishop, d2 white bishop, f2 white pawn, g2 white pawn, a1 white rook, d1 white queen, e1 white rook, g1 white king

Here, Keres played 18...Nd3!

Another example of this type of desperado is Tal–Keres, Candidates Tournament, Curaçao 1962 (see diagram).

Seeing that White's knight on d4 is unprotected, Keres offered to simplify the position with 18... Nd3!, when 19.Bxd3 Bxd4 20.Rb1? would allow 20...Qf6! forking White's b- and f-pawns. Instead, Tal went in for complications with 19. Nc6? Nxf2!, when either 20.Kxf2 Qb6+ or 20.Nxd8 Nxd1 21.Nxf7 Nxb2 22.Nxd6 Nc4! 23.Nxc4 Bxa1 would leave Black with a material advantage.

Tal tried:

20. Qf3? Nxh3+! 21. Kh2

If White captures the knight, 21...Qb6+ regains the piece and leaves Black with a won game.

21... Be5+! 22. Nxe5 dxe5 23. Rad1

If 23.gxh3, Qxd2.

23... Nf4!

Now 24.Bxf4 is met by 24...Qh4+. Black won.

== Examples of the second definition ==
=== Pilnick vs. Reshevsky ===
Pilnick vs. Reshevsky, 1942

Position: a7 black king, b7 black pawn, a6 black pawn, a5 white pawn, f5 white queen, g5 black pawn, h4 black pawn, e3 black queen, h1 white king

Black moved 92...g4??; White replied 93.Qf2!

One of the best known examples of sacrificing a desperado piece to achieve stalemate is the game between Carl Pilnick and Sammy Reshevsky, US Championship 1942 (see diagram). After:

92... g4?? 93. Qf2!

the white queen is a desperado piece: Black will lose if he doesn't capture it, but its capture results in stalemate.

=== Evans vs. Reshevsky ===
Evans vs. Reshevsky, 1963

Position: c8 white queen, f7 white rook, g7 black pawn, h7 black king, b5 black pawn, e5 black pawn, g5 black queen, h5 black pawn, b4 white pawn, e4 white pawn, f4 black knight, e3 black rook, f3 white pawn, g3 white pawn, h3 white pawn, h2 white king

Position before 47.h4!

Position: g8 black king, g7 white rook, b5 black pawn, e5 black pawn, h5 black pawn, b4 white pawn, e4 white pawn, f4 black knight, h4 white pawn, f3 white pawn, g3 black queen, e2 black rook, h1 white king

After 50.Rxg7+! – the eternal rook

Another of the best known examples involves a swindle in a game by Larry Evans versus Samuel Reshevsky. Evans sacrificed his queen on move 49 and offered his rook on move 50. White's rook has been called the eternal rook. Capturing it results in stalemate, but otherwise it stays on the seventh rank and perpetually checks Black's king.

47. h4! Re2+ 48. Kh1 Qxg3?? 49. Qg8+! Kxg8 50. Rxg7+

As with any perpetual check, a draw by agreement will occur or a draw by threefold repetition or the fifty-move rule can eventually be claimed.

The game was called "The Swindle of the Century".

=== Reshevsky vs. Geller ===
Reshevsky vs. Geller, 1953

Position: f6 white rook, f5 black pawn, h5 black king, f4 white pawn, h4 white pawn, f3 black rook, g3 white pawn, f2 white king

Position after 53...Rf3+!

Reshevsky also fell into a stalemating trap against Efim Geller in the Zürich 1953 Candidates Tournament. After 53... Rf3+! (diagram) 54.Kxf3 would be stalemate. If 54.Kg2, then 54...Rxg3+! winning a crucial pawn; again, White could not take the rook without resulting in stalemate.

The game continued:

54. Ke2 Rxg3 55. Rxf5+ Kxh4

and the players agreed to a draw a few moves later.

In light of the three aforementioned Reshevsky games, the Russian analyst Verkhovsky observed that Reshevsky apparently suffered from stalemate blindness every 11 years.

=== Keres vs. Fischer ===
Position: a7 black pawn, d7 white bishop, h7 black king, b6 black pawn, b5 white pawn, h4 white king, g3 white queen, g2 black pawn, f1 black queen

Position after 71...Kh7

Another famous game saved by the possibility of stalemate is Keres–Fischer, Curaçao 1962. Although Fischer avoided the stalemating lines, he allowed Keres to draw by perpetual check instead. In the diagrammed position, Keres played the centralizing 72. Qe5!! Fischer commented:

What's this? He makes no attempt to stop me from queening!? Gradually my excitement subsided. The more I studied the situation, the more I realized Black had no win.

Analysis: Keres vs. Fischer

Position: a7 black pawn, g7 black king, b6 black pawn, g6 white queen, b5 white pawn, h4 white king, h3 white bishop, g1 black queen, h1 black queen

After 75.Qg6+!

Now if 72... g1=Q, 73.Bf5+ Kg8 (73... Kh6?? 74.Qh8#) 74.Qe8+ Kg7 75.Qe7+ Kg8 (75...Kh8?? 76.Qh7#) 76.Qe8+ draws by repetition; if 72...Qf2+, 73.Kh3 g1=Q 74.Bf5+ Kh6 75.Qf6+ Kh5 76.Bg6+! Qxg6 77.Qg5+!! and either capture is stalemate. The game continued:

72... Qh1+ 73. Bh3

Now if 73...g1=Q, 74.Qh5+ Kg7 75.Qg6+! and either capture of the queen results in stalemate (see analysis diagram) – otherwise the white queen keeps checking the black king: 75...Kh8 76.Qh6+ Kg8 77.Qg6+! Kf8 78.Qf6+ Ke8 79.Qe6+, and Black must repeat moves with 79...Kf8, since 79...Kd8?? runs into 80.Qd7#.

73... Qxh3+ 74. Kxh3 g1=Q 75. Qe7+ Kh8 76. Qf8+ Kh7 77. Qf7+ ½–½

=== Tilberger vs. Drelikiewicz ===
Tilberger vs. Drelikiewicz, 1970

Position: d7 white rook, h7 black pawn, g6 black rook, h6 black king, c5 white pawn, d5 white pawn, h4 black pawn, g3 white pawn, f2 white queen, g2 white king, h2 white pawn, b1 black queen

Black to move

Sometimes it is possible for the inferior side to sacrifice two or three pieces in rapid succession to achieve a stalemate. An example is seen in the game Tilberger–Drelikiewicz, Poland 1970 (diagram).

Black saved the draw with:

1... h3+! 2. Kxh3 Qf5+! 3. Qxf5

Not 3.Kg2? Qxd7.

3... Rxg3+! 4. Kh4 Rg4+!

=== Korchnoi vs. Vaganian ===
Position: a7 black pawn, b7 black pawn, a6 black king, c6 black bishop, e6 white rook, c5 white queen, d5 black pawn, f5 black pawn, b4 white pawn, c4 black knight, d4 white pawn, f4 white pawn, a3 white pawn, g3 white pawn, c2 white pawn, g2 white king, h2 white pawn, d1 black queen

Black to move

In Korchnoi–Vaganian, Skellefteå 1989, a similar three-piece sacrifice might have enabled Vaganian to save the game. From the position diagrammed, Vaganian played:

35... Qxc2+? 36. Kh3 Qa4 37. Kh4

Jacob Aagaard notes that now "White had a winning endgame, which Korchnoi indeed won."

Analysis: Korchnoi vs. Vaganian

Position: a7 black pawn, a6 black king, b6 black pawn, c6 white queen, d5 black pawn, f5 black pawn, b4 white pawn, d4 white pawn, f4 white pawn, a3 white pawn, e3 white rook, g3 white pawn, c2 white pawn, g2 white king, h2 white pawn, f1 black queen

After 37...Qf1+!

Aagaard instead recommends 35...b6!!, when the natural 36.Qxc6 would be met by 36...Ne3+! 37.Rxe3 Qf1+! (analysis diagram) 38.Kxf1 stalemate.

=== Korn vs. Pitschak ===
Position: e8 black king, a7 black pawn, c7 black knight, g7 black pawn, h7 black pawn, a6 white pawn, e6 white pawn, e5 white pawn, d4 black queen, g4 white queen, d3 black pawn, g3 black pawn, e2 white bishop, g2 white pawn, f1 white rook, h1 white king

Black to move

In Korn–Pitschak, Brno 1936, White's desperado queen and rook saved the draw despite White's apparently mobile e-pawns. In the position illustrated, Black appeared to be winning after:

1... dxe2!

in light of 2.Qxd4 exf1=Q+ or 2.Qxe2 Qh4+ 3.Kg1 Qh2#. Instead, Korn played:

Korn vs. Pitschak, 1936

Position: d8 black king, e8 black knight, a7 black pawn, e7 white queen, g7 black pawn, h7 black pawn, a6 white pawn, e6 white pawn, e5 white pawn, d4 black queen, g3 black pawn, e2 black pawn, g2 white pawn, h1 white king

Position after 6.Qe7+!

2. Rf8+! Kxf8 3. Qf5+ Ke8

3...Kg8? 4.Qf7+ Kh8 5.Qf8#

4. Qf7+ Kd8 5. Qf8+! Ne8 6. Qe7+! (diagram)

Now 6...Kxe7 is stalemate, while 6...Kc8 loses to 7.Qb7+ Kd8 8.e7#.

=== Hegde vs. Palatnik ===
Hegde vs. Palatnik, 1988

Position: a8 black king, a7 white pawn, h7 white rook, a6 white king, d4 black bishop

Black to move can draw by 59...Bg7!

This endgame position is from a game between Ravi Gopal Hegde and Semon Palatnik, Kozhikode 1988. The position appeared in the endgame section of Chess Informant 45. Black resigned in this position but had an easy draw:

59... Bg7! 60. Rh4 Bd4!

(threatening 61...Bxa7), etc.

Capturing the bishop results in a stalemate, allowing 61...Bxa7 is a draw, and 61.Rh7 Bg7 leads to a repetition of position.

=== Vasilevich vs. Kosteniuk ===
Vasilevich vs. Kosteniuk, 2000

Position: c8 white queen, h5 black king, c4 black pawn, b3 black queen, f3 black knight, c1 white king

Black had just blundered with 55...Nh4–f3??

Now (see diagram) the game ended with:

56. Qg4+!

If Black captures the queen, it is stalemate. If Black instead plays 56...Kh6, then 57.Qg6+! forces Black to capture the queen.

Instead of 55...Nf3??, 55...Qc3+ followed by 56...Nf3 would have allowed Black to keep her decisive advantage.

=== Ponziani study ===
Ponziani, 1782

Position: f8 black king, g7 black rook, e6 white queen, h5 white king

Black to move draws, starting with 1...Rh7+

Black draws after:

1... Rh7+ 2. Kg5 Rg7+ 3. Kh6 Rh7+!

Capturing the rook results in stalemate.

4. Kg5 Rg7+ 5. Kf6

If 5.Kf5 then 5...Rf7+; and then if 6.Ke5 then 6...Re7.

5... Rg6+!

Capturing the rook results in stalemate.

== Bibliography ==
- Aagaard, Jacob (2004), Excelling at Chess Calculation, Gloucester Publishers, ISBN 978-1-85744-360-8
- Averbakh, Yuri (1996), Chess Middlegames: Essential Knowledge, Cadogan, ISBN 1-85744-125-7
- Dvoretsky, Mark (2006), Dvoretsky's Endgame Manual (second ed.), Russell Enterprises, ISBN 1-888690-28-3
- Evans, Larry (1970), Modern Chess Brilliancies, Fireside, ISBN 0-671-22420-4
- Fischer, Bobby (2008) [1969], My 60 Memorable Games, Batsford, ISBN 978-1-906388-30-0
- Hooper, David; Whyld, Kenneth (1992), The Oxford Companion to Chess (second ed.), Oxford University Press, ISBN 0-19-866164-9
- Korn, Walter (1966), The Brilliant Touch in Chess, Dover Publications
- Pachman, Ludek (1973), Attack and Defense in Modern Chess Tactics, David McKay
- Rabinovich, Ilya (2012) [1927,1938], The Russian Endgame Handbook, Mongoose, ISBN 978-1-936277-39-1
- Šahovski Informator, Belgrade. Encyclopedia of Chess Openings, Vol. C (1997), at 271 n.26.
- Soltis, Andrew (1975), The Art of Defense in Chess, David McKay, ISBN 0-679-13043-8
- Tartakower, Savielly; du Mont, Julius (1975), 100 Master Games of Modern Chess, Dover Publications
- van Perlo, Gerardus C. (2006), Van Perlo's Endgame Tactics, New In Chess, ISBN 978-90-5691-168-3
