= Greek gift sacrifice =

Chess move

a4	b4 black rook	c4 black king	d4
a3	b3 black pawn	c3 black pawn	d3 white bishop
a2 black pawn	b2	c2	d2
a1	b1	c1	d1
Depiction of the Greek gift sacrifice.
- Category: Chess tactical motif
- Alternative name: Classical bishop sacrifice
- Typical move: Bxh7+ (White), Bxh2+ (Black)
- Objective: Attack the castled king
- Common continuation: Ng5+ (or Ng4+) with queen support
- Target: Kingside castled position
- Typical outcome: Checkmate, winning attack, or material gain
- Famous examples: Lasker–Bauer (1889), Colle–O'Hanlon (1930)

In chess, the Greek gift sacrifice, also known as the classical bishop sacrifice, is a typical sacrifice of a bishop by White playing Bxh7+ or Black playing Bxh2+ at some point after the opponent has castled kingside, with the goal generally being to attack and checkmate the opponent's king, or to regain material.

Greek gift sacrifices, or the threat of them, occur relatively frequently in play, especially at amateur level. One of the most famous examples of a sacrifice of this type carried out successfully is found in the game Edgard Colle–John O'Hanlon, Nice 1930. Less commonly, a Greek gift sacrifice may be the prelude to a double bishop sacrifice, as seen in Lasker–Bauer, Amsterdam 1889.

== Requirements ==
The Greek gift sacrifice usually has several prerequisites in order to succeed. In general, the attack will succeed if:

- the attacker has more control over the g5-square (g4 if the attacker is black) than the defender;
- the attacker's knight can move to g5 (or g4) to deliver a check;
- the attacker's queen can join the attack, often on the h-file;
- the defender cannot move a piece to safely defend square h7 (or h2);
- the defender cannot easily reorganize his defense.

If there is a defending bishop on e7 (or e2), a pawn on h4 (or h5) is necessary. Otherwise, it can be useful.

== Illustration ==
Position: a8 black rook, b8 black knight, c8 black bishop, d8 black queen, f8 black rook, g8 black king, a7 black pawn, b7 black pawn, c7 black pawn, d7 black knight, f7 black pawn, g7 black pawn, h7 black pawn, e6 black pawn, d5 black pawn, e5 white pawn, b4 black bishop, d4 white pawn, c3 white knight, d3 white bishop, f3 white knight, a2 white pawn, b2 white pawn, c2 white pawn, f2 white pawn, g2 white pawn, h2 white pawn, a1 white rook, c1 white bishop, d1 white queen, e1 white king, h1 white rook

Position after 6...0-0??. The Greek gift sacrifice wins.

The position after the moves 1.e4 e6 2.d4 d5 3.Nc3 Nf6 4.e5 Nfd7 5.Nf3 Bb4 6.Bd3 0-0?? (diagram) is a simple case where the Greek gift sacrifice works. White can play 7.Bxh7+! Kxh7 8.Ng5+ to force Black to give up the queen to prevent mate:

- 8...Kh8 9.Qh5+ Kg8 10.Qh7#
- 8...Kg8 9.Qh5 threatening 10.Qh7#, to which the only feasible responses are
  - 9...Qxg5 10.Bxg5 wins the queen, and
  - 9...Re8 10.Qxf7+ Kh8 11.Qh5+ Kg8 12.Qh7+ Kf8 13.Qh8+ Ke7 14.Qxg7#
- 8...Kh6 9.Nxf7+ wins the queen.
- 8...Kg6 9.h4 and there is no satisfactory way to meet the threat of 10.h5+ Kh6 (10...Kf5 11.g4#) 11.Nxf7+, winning the queen.

== Etymology ==
The etymology of the phrase "Greek gift" in this context is not entirely clear. The obvious explanation is that it alludes to the Trojan Horse, and specifically to Laocoön's famous Timeo Danaos et dona ferentes ("I fear the Greeks even when they bring gifts", Virgil's Aeneid II.49). The Oxford Companion to Chess, however, suggests that one explanation is that the sacrifice often occurred in Gioachino Greco's games.
