= Sacrifice (chess) =

Chess move that offers material gain in exchange for positional advantage

Position: a8 black rook, c8 black bishop, d8 black queen, e8 black king, h8 black rook, a7 black pawn, b7 black pawn, c7 black pawn, d7 black knight, e7 black bishop, f7 white bishop, g7 black pawn, h7 black pawn, d6 black pawn, f6 black knight, e5 black pawn, d4 white pawn, e4 white pawn, c3 white knight, f3 white knight, a2 white pawn, b2 white pawn, c2 white pawn, f2 white pawn, g2 white pawn, h2 white pawn, a1 white rook, c1 white bishop, d1 white queen, e1 white king, h1 white rook

In the Hanham Variation of the Philidor Defence, the move 6.Bxf7+ is a bishop sacrifice.

In chess, a sacrifice is a move that gives up a piece with the objective of gaining tactical or positional compensation in other forms. A sacrifice could also be a deliberate exchange of a chess piece of higher value for an opponent's piece of lower value.

Any chess piece excluding the king may be sacrificed. Because players usually try to hold on to their own pieces, offering a sacrifice can come as an unpleasant surprise to one's opponent, putting them off balance and causing them to waste precious time trying to calculate whether the sacrifice is sound or not, and whether to accept it. Sacrificing one's queen (the most valuable piece), or a string of pieces, adds to the surprise, and such games can be awarded brilliancy prizes.

== Types of sacrifice ==
=== Real versus sham ===
Rudolf Spielmann proposed a division between sham and real sacrifices:

- In a real sacrifice, the sacrificing player will often have to play on with less material than their opponent for quite some time.
- In a sham sacrifice, the player offering the sacrifice will soon regain material of the same or greater value, or else force mate. A sham sacrifice of this latter type is sometimes known as a pseudo sacrifice.

In compensation for a real sacrifice, the player receives dynamic, positional, or other non-material advantages which they must capitalize on, or risk losing the game due to the material deficit. Because of the risk involved, real sacrifices are also called speculative sacrifices.

==== Real sacrifices ====
Attack on the king
A player might sacrifice a pawn or piece to get open lines around the vicinity of the opponent's king, to get a kingside space advantage, to destroy or damage the opposing king's pawn cover, or to keep the opposing king in the center. Unless the opponent manages to fend off the attack, they are likely to lose. The Greek gift sacrifice is a canonical example.

Development
It is common to give up a pawn in the opening to speed up one's development. Gambits typically fall into this category. Developing sacrifices are frequently returned at some point by the opponent before the development edge can turn into a more substantial threat such as a kingside attack.

Strategic/positional
In a general sense, the aim of all real sacrifices is to obtain a positional advantage. However, there are some speculative sacrifices where the compensation is unrelated to an ensuing attack and may come instead in the form of an open file or diagonal, a weakness in the opponent's pawn structure, a blockade, or some other positional asset. These are the hardest sacrifices to make, requiring deep strategic understanding.

==== Sham sacrifices ====
Checkmate
A common benefit of making a sacrifice is to allow the sacrificing player to checkmate the opponent. Since checkmate is the ultimate goal of chess, the loss of material (see Chess piece relative value) does not matter in a successful checkmating attack. Sacrifices leading to checkmate are typically forcing, and often checks, leaving the opponent with only one or a few options.

Avoiding loss
The counterpart to the above is saving a lost game. A sacrifice could be made to force stalemate or perpetual check, to create a fortress, or otherwise force a draw, or to avoid even greater loss of material.

Material gain
A sacrifice might initiate a combination that results in an overall material gain, making the upfront investment of the sacrifice worthwhile. A sacrifice leading to a pawn promotion is a special case of this type of sacrifice.

Simplification
Even if the sacrifice leads to net material loss for the foreseeable future, the sacrificing player may benefit because they are already ahead in material and the exchanges simplify the position making it easier to win. A player ahead in material may decide that it is worthwhile to get rid of one of the last effective pieces the opponent has.

The tactical sham sacrifices can be categorized further by the mechanism by which the sacrifice is made. Some sacrifices may fall into more than one category.

- In a deflection sacrifice, the aim is to distract one of the opponent's pieces from a square where it is performing a particular duty.
- In a destruction sacrifice, a piece is sacrificed in order to knock away a materially inferior—but tactically more crucial piece—so that the sacrificing player can gain control over the squares the taken chessman controlled.
- A magnet sacrifice is similar to a deflection sacrifice, but the motivation behind a magnet sacrifice is to pull an opponent's piece to a tactically poor square, rather than pulling it away from a crucial square.
- In a clearance sacrifice, the sacrificing player aims to vacate the square the sacrificed piece stood on, either to open up lines for his own pieces, or to put another, more useful piece on the same square.
- In a tempo sacrifice, the sacrificing player abstains from spending time to prevent the opponent from winning material because the time saved can be used for something even more beneficial, for example pursuing an attack on the king or guiding a passed pawn towards promotion.
- In a suicide sacrifice, the sacrificing player aims to rid themselves of the remaining pieces capable of performing legal moves, and thereby obtain a stalemate and a draw from a poor position.

=== Other types of sacrifices ===
==== Forced versus non-forced ====
Another way to classify sacrifices is to distinguish between forcing and non-forcing sacrifices. The former type leave the opponent with no option but acceptance, typically because not doing so would leave them behind in material with no compensation. Non-forcing sacrifices, on the other hand, give the opponent a choice. These sacrifices, also known as passive sacrifices, often leave an attacked piece under attack to pursue even more active ideas. A common error is to not recognize when a particular sacrifice can be safely declined with no ill-effects.

== Examples ==
=== Deflection sacrifice ===
Aronian vs. Svidler, 2006

Position: c8 black rook, e8 black rook, g8 black king, b7 black pawn, f7 black pawn, g7 black bishop, h7 black pawn, g6 black pawn, a5 black pawn, g5 white bishop, a4 white pawn, c4 black queen, d4 white pawn, d3 white queen, f2 white pawn, g2 white pawn, h2 white pawn, a1 white rook, d1 white rook, g1 white king

Position after 24.exd4??

In the diagram, GM Aronian has mistakenly played 24.exd4??, opening up the e-file for Black's rook. After Svidler played 24...Re1+!, Aronian resigned, because Black's move forces the reply 25.Rxe1 (or 25.Qf1 Qxf1#), after which White's queen is undefended and therefore lost.

This particular type of sacrifice has also been called the "Hook and Ladder trick", for the white queen is precariously at the top of the "ladder", while the rook is at the bottom, supporting it.

=== Suicide sacrifice ===
Evans vs. Reshevsky, 1963

Position: c8 white queen, f7 white rook, g7 black pawn, h7 black king, b5 black pawn, e5 black pawn, g5 black queen, h5 black pawn, b4 white pawn, e4 white pawn, f4 black knight, h4 white pawn, f3 white pawn, g3 white pawn, e2 black rook, h1 white king

Black to move

Black played 1...Qxg3? and White drew with 2.Qg8+! Kxg8 (on any other move Black will get mated) 3.Rxg7+!. White intends to keep checking on the seventh rank, and if Black ever captures the rook it is stalemate.

This save from Evans has been dubbed "The Swindle of the Century". White's rook is known as a desperado.

=== Non-forcing sacrifice ===
Najdorf vs. Reshevsky, 1952

Position: a8 black rook, c8 black bishop, d8 black queen, f8 black rook, g8 black king, b7 black pawn, d7 black knight, e7 black bishop, f7 black pawn, g7 black pawn, d6 black pawn, e6 black pawn, f6 black knight, h6 black pawn, a5 black pawn, b5 white pawn, g5 white knight, c4 white pawn, h4 white pawn, a3 white pawn, c3 white knight, e3 white pawn, b2 white bishop, c2 white queen, e2 white bishop, f2 white pawn, g2 white pawn, a1 white rook, e1 white king, h1 white rook

Position after 13...h6 14.h4

This time Reshevsky is at the receiving end of a sacrifice. White has just played h2–h4. If Black takes the knight he has to give up his own knight on f6 to avoid mate on h7. Instead, he simply ignored the bait and continued developing.

=== Positional sacrifice ===
Spassky vs. Tal, 1971

Position: a8 black rook, d8 black queen, f8 black rook, g8 black king, a7 black pawn, b7 black bishop, e7 black bishop, f7 black pawn, g7 black pawn, h7 black pawn, b6 black pawn, e6 black pawn, f6 black knight, d5 black pawn, e5 white pawn, f4 white pawn, a3 white pawn, c3 white knight, d3 white pawn, e3 white bishop, f3 white knight, b2 white pawn, g2 white pawn, h2 white pawn, a1 white rook, d1 white queen, f1 white rook, h1 white king

Black played 14...d4

In this game Black played 14...d4! 15.Nxd4 Nd5. In exchange for the sacrificed pawn, Black has obtained a semi-open file, a diagonal, an outpost on d5 and saddled White with a backward pawn on d3. The game was eventually drawn.

=== Sacrifice to checkmate ===
Position: a8 black rook, c8 black bishop, d8 black queen, e8 black king, f8 black bishop, g8 black knight, h8 black rook, d7 black knight, e7 black pawn, g7 black pawn, h7 black pawn, c6 black pawn, f6 black pawn, b5 black pawn, d5 black pawn, f5 white bishop, a4 black pawn, d4 white pawn, f4 white bishop, h4 white pawn, c3 white knight, d3 white queen, e3 white pawn, f3 white knight, a2 white pawn, b2 white pawn, c2 white pawn, f2 white pawn, g2 white pawn, c1 white king, d1 white rook, h1 white rook

White to move

The following example features a forced bishop sacrifice by White. White can force mate in two moves in the diagram at left as follows: 1.Bg6+! hxg6 2.Qxg6#

=== Queen sacrifice leads to smothered mate ===
McConnell vs. Morphy, 1849

Position: a8 black rook, f8 black rook, g8 black king, a7 black pawn, b6 black queen, e6 black bishop, h6 black pawn, d5 black pawn, f5 black pawn, g5 black pawn, c4 white pawn, f4 black pawn, h3 black knight, a2 white pawn, b2 white pawn, c2 white queen, d2 white knight, g2 white pawn, h2 white pawn, a1 white rook, c1 white bishop, f1 white rook, h1 white king

Black to move

In this position, Black moves 22...Qg1+! forcing the white rook to take black's queen by 23.Rxg1; the king cannot take the queen because it would have been in check from the knight on h3. Having forced the rook out of a position where it was defending the f-file and into a position where it blocked the king from making any move, the black knight delivers a smothered mate by 23...Nf2#.

=== Philidor sacrifice ===
Position: a8 black rook, b8 black knight, c8 black bishop, d8 black queen, f8 black bishop, h8 black rook, a7 black pawn, b7 black pawn, c7 black pawn, f7 black king, g7 black pawn, h7 black pawn, d6 black pawn, f6 black knight, e4 white pawn, a2 white pawn, b2 white pawn, c2 white pawn, d2 white pawn, f2 white pawn, g2 white pawn, h2 white pawn, a1 white rook, b1 white knight, c1 white bishop, d1 white queen, e1 white king, f1 white bishop, h1 white rook

Position after 4.Nxf7 Kxf7 in Petrov's Defense

A Philidor sacrifice, recommended and practiced by Philidor, is the sacrifice of a minor piece for one or two pawns for greater pawn mobility as compensation. An example of this real, strategic/positional sacrifice can occur in Petrov's Defense after 1.e4 e5 2.Nf3 Nf6 3.Nxe5 d6 where White elects 4.Nxf7 Kxf7 (diagram). Another openings example is the Halloween Gambit.

== See also ==
- Chess tactics
- Desperado
- Exchange sacrifice
- Game of the Century
- Immortal Game
- § Planinc vs. Minić, 1973 – a game that shows the sacrifice of a rook for a tempo
- Queen sacrifice
