= Immortal Losing Game =

Animation of the game

The Immortal Losing Game is a chess game between the Soviet grandmaster David Bronstein and the Polish International Master Bogdan Śliwa played in 1957 in Gotha. The name is an allusion to the more famous Immortal Game between Adolf Anderssen and Lionel Kieseritzky. The game acquired its name because Bronstein, in a completely lost position, set a series of elegant traps in an attempt to swindle a victory from a lost game, although Śliwa deftly avoided the traps and won.

== The game ==
White: Bogdan Śliwa Black: David Bronstein Opening: Dutch Defence (ECO A81)

1. d4 f5 2. g3 g6 3. Bg2 Bg7 4. Nc3 Nf6

Both players have fianchettoed their bishops. If White had played the now-standard 4.c4 instead of 4.Nc3, the Leningrad Variation of the Dutch Defence would have been reached.

5. Bg5 Nc6 6. Qd2 d6 7. h4 e6 8. 0-0-0 h6 9. Bf4 Bd7 10. e4 fxe4 11. Nxe4 Nd5 12. Ne2 Qe7 13. c4 Nb6?

Better is 13...Nxf4 14.Nxf4 Qf7.

14. c5! dxc5 15. Bxc7! 0-0? 16. Bd6

White wins the exchange by skewering Black's queen and rook.

16... Qf7 17. Bxf8 Rxf8 18. dxc5 Nd5 19. f4 Rd8 20. N2c3 Ndb4? 21. Nd6 Qf8 22. Nxb7 Nd4!

If 22...Rb8 then 23.Qxd7+−.

Position: d8 white knight, f8 black queen, g8 black king, a7 black pawn, g7 black bishop, e6 black pawn, g6 black pawn, h6 black pawn, b5 black bishop, c5 white pawn, b4 black knight, d4 black knight, f4 white pawn, h4 white pawn, c3 white knight, g3 white pawn, a2 white pawn, b2 white pawn, d2 white queen, g2 white bishop, c1 white king, d1 white rook, h1 white rook

Position after 23...Bb5!

23. Nxd8 Bb5! (diagram) 24. Nxe6!

If 24.Nxb5?! then 24...Qf5! and now:
- 25.Nxd4?? Nxa2#
- 25.Qxb4?? Qc2#
- 25.Nc3?? Nxa2+! 26.Nxa2 Nb3#
- 25.Rde1?? Nxa2+ 26.Kd1 Qb1+ 27.Qc1 Qxc1#
- 25.b3 Qxc5+ 26.Kb1! (26.Nc3?? Ne2+! 27.Qxe2 Qxc3+ 28.Kb1 Qa1#) Qf5+ 27.Kc1! Qc5+ draws by perpetual check
- White can still probably win with 25.Qf2! Nxa2+ 26.Kd2 Nxb5 27.Ke1

24... Bd3! 25. Bd5!

If 25.Nxf8?? then 25...Nxa2+ 26.Nxa2 Nb3#.

Position: g8 black king, a7 black pawn, g7 black bishop, g6 black pawn, h6 black pawn, c5 white pawn, d5 black queen, b4 black knight, d4 white knight, f4 white pawn, h4 white pawn, c3 white knight, d3 black bishop, g3 white pawn, a2 white pawn, b2 white pawn, d2 white queen, c1 white king, d1 white rook, h1 white rook

Position after 26...Qxd5!

25... Qf5! 26. Nxd4+ Qxd5! (diagram) 27. Nc2!

If 27.Nxd5?? then 27...Nxa2#.

27... Bxc3 28. bxc3!

If 28.Qxc3?? then 28...Nxa2+ wins the queen.

28... Qxa2 29. cxb4! 1–0

If 29.Nxb4?? then 29...Qb1# (or 29...Qa1#).

Position: g8 black king, a7 black pawn, g6 black pawn, h6 black pawn, c5 white pawn, b4 white pawn, f4 white pawn, h4 white pawn, d3 black bishop, g3 white pawn, a2 black queen, c2 white knight, d2 white queen, c1 white king, d1 white rook, h1 white rook

Final position after 29.cxb4!

== See also ==
- List of chess games
