= Blunder (chess) =

Unusually bad move in chess

In chess, a blunder is a critically bad mistake that severely worsens the player's position by allowing a loss of material, checkmate, or anything similar. It is usually caused by some tactical oversight, whether due to time trouble, overconfidence, or carelessness. Although blunders are most common in beginner games, all human players make them, even at the world championship level. Creating opportunities for the opponent to blunder is an important skill in chess.

What qualifies as a blunder rather than a normal mistake is somewhat subjective. A weak move from a novice player might be explained by the player's lack of skill, while the same move from a master might be called a blunder. In chess annotation, blunders are typically marked with two question marks ("??") after the move notation.

Especially among amateur and novice players, blunders often occur because of a faulty thought process where players do not consider the opponent's forcing moves. In particular, checks, captures, and threats need to be considered at each move. Neglecting these possibilities leaves a player vulnerable to simple tactical errors.

One technique formerly recommended to avoid blunders was to write down the planned move on the score sheet, then take one last look before making it. This practice was not uncommon even at grandmaster level. In 2005, however, the International Chess Federation (FIDE) banned it, requiring instead that the move be made before being written down. The US Chess Federation also implemented this rule, effective January 1, 2007 (a change to rule 15A), although it is not universally enforced.

== Examples ==
Strong players, even grandmasters, occasionally make critical blunders.

=== Chigorin vs. Steinitz ===
Position: a7 black pawn, b7 black pawn, e7 white rook, h7 black pawn, d6 white bishop, e6 white bishop, f6 black king, g6 black bishop, d5 white pawn, f5 black pawn, h4 black pawn, a2 white pawn, b2 white pawn, d2 black rook, e2 black rook, h2 white pawn, f1 white rook, h1 white king

White to make his 32nd move

This position is from game 23 of the 1892 World Championship in Havana, Cuba. Mikhail Chigorin, playing White, is a piece up (Wilhelm Steinitz lost a knight for a pawn earlier in the game), but his bishop is forced to stay on d6 to protect both the rook on e7 and the pawn on h2. If he won, Chigorin would have tied the match and sent it to a tiebreaker game. After 31...Rcd2, he played 32.Bb4??. Steinitz replied 32...Rxh2+ and Chigorin immediately resigned (in light of the blind swine mate 33.Kg1 Rdg2#), losing the match.

=== Grünfeld vs. Alekhine ===
Position: c8 black queen, d8 black rook, g8 black king, f7 black pawn, g7 black bishop, a6 black pawn, g6 black pawn, h6 black pawn, b5 black pawn, d4 white knight, e4 black pawn, a3 white pawn, d3 black knight, e3 white pawn, a2 white knight, b2 white pawn, e2 white queen, f2 white pawn, g2 white pawn, h2 white pawn, d1 white rook, g1 white king

White to make his 30th move

This game between Ernst Grünfeld and Alexander Alekhine is from Round 2 of the 1923 Karlsbad tournament. In the position on the diagram, White is to make his 30th move. Grünfeld played 30.f3?? which immediately loses to 30...Rxd4! because 31.exd4 is impossible: after 31...Bxd4+ 32.Kf1 Nf4 33.Qxe4 Qc4+ 35.Ke1 Nxg2+ 36.Kd2 Be3+, White will at least lose his queen. The game ended shortly afterwards: 31.fxe4 Nf4 32.exf4 Qc4 33.Qxc4 Rxd1+ 34.Qf1 Bd4+ and Grünfeld resigned due to the unavoidable back-rank mate 35.Kh1 Rxf1#.

=== Petrosian vs. Bronstein ===
Position: b8 black rook, c8 black bishop, f8 black rook, h8 black king, b7 black pawn, d7 black knight, g7 black queen, a6 black pawn, d6 white queen, g6 black pawn, a5 white pawn, d5 white knight, e5 black pawn, f5 black knight, h5 black pawn, c4 white pawn, e4 white knight, h4 white pawn, g3 white pawn, b2 white rook, f2 white pawn, g2 white bishop, b1 white rook, h1 white king

White to make his 36th move

This position arose in the 1956 Candidates Tournament in Amsterdam. Tigran Petrosian (White), enjoys a clear advantage with strong knights, active rooks, and great mobility while Black's position is congested. David Bronstein (Black) has for the last seven turns made aimless knight moves, Nc6–d4–c6–d4, while White had kept strengthening his position. Now he played Nd4–f5, threatening White's queen. White can preserve the advantage by a move like 36.Qc7; however, he overlooked that the queen was en prise, played 36.Ng5?? and resigned after 36...Nxd6.

=== García vs. Ivkov ===
Position: f8 black rook, g8 black king, a7 black pawn, f7 black pawn, h7 black pawn, e6 black knight, f6 white queen, g6 black pawn, d4 black pawn, g4 white pawn, f3 black pawn, h3 white pawn, d2 white bishop, f2 white pawn, b1 black queen, f1 white bishop, g1 white king

Black to make his 36th move

In the 4th Capablanca Memorial International Chess Tournament (1965), Borislav Ivkov was sitting comfortably at the top spot as the tournament neared its end. His triumph quickly turned into tragedy, however, in the penultimate round.

In the position shown, Ivkov (Black) is completely winning against Gilberto García (White), having both a significant material advantage and a noticeable positional advantage, as White's light-squared bishop is pinned to the king. However, Black's winning position was undermined by time trouble. With no time to think, he played the catastrophic blunder 36...d3?? and resigned after García responded with 37.Bc3!—threatening 38.Qh8#, which cannot be prevented. Demoralized by his error, Ivkov lost his last round of the match against Karl Robatsch, allowing Vasily Smyslov to narrowly win the tournament.

=== Najdorf vs. Fischer ===
Position: b8 black rook, e8 black knight, f8 black queen, g8 black king, b7 black bishop, f7 black pawn, g7 black bishop, a6 black pawn, h6 black pawn, a5 white knight, c5 black pawn, d5 white pawn, f5 white queen, a4 white pawn, b4 black pawn, c4 white knight, f4 black pawn, f3 white bishop, h3 white pawn, b2 white pawn, f2 white pawn, g2 white pawn, d1 white rook, g1 white king

Black to make his 30th move

This game between Miguel Najdorf and Bobby Fischer from the 1966 Piatigorsky Cup is an example where a player in a bad position breaks under the pressure. According to Mednis, Fischer's decisive error came earlier in the game, and here the black pawn on f4 is about to fall. Fischer played the blunder 30...Nd6?? cutting the game short. After 31.Nxd6, Fischer resigned because 31...Qxd6 32.Nxb7 wins a piece (32...Rxb7 33.Qc8+ forks the rook on b7).

Najdorf commented on Black's 29...Rb8: "There is no satisfactory defense. If 29...Ba8 then 30.Nb6 or 30.Qf5 would win. ... I had to win minor material (the pawn at f4) but this [30...Nd6?] decides immediately. Fischer, demoralized because of his inferior position, did not notice the simple point."

=== Korchnoi vs. Karpov ===
Position: h7 white rook, c6 black rook, a4 white pawn, e4 black knight, a3 white rook, d2 black knight, e2 black king, g2 white pawn, h2 white pawn, g1 white king

White to make his 39th move

This position is from Game 17 of the 1978 World Championship between Viktor Korchnoi, the challenger, and the World Champion, Anatoly Karpov. Karpov, playing Black, is threatening a back-rank mate with 39...Rc1#. Korchnoi could have prevented this by moving his g-pawn (but not the h-pawn because 39.h3 or h4 leads to 39...Rc1+ 40.Kh2 Nf1+ 41.Kg1 Nfg3+ 42.Kh2 Rh1#), providing an escape square for his king. In serious time trouble, Korchnoi played 39.Ra1?? and resigned after 39...Nf3+! with the forced checkmate after 40.gxf3 Rg6+ 41.Kh1 Nf2# or 40.Kh1 Nf2#. Karpov went on to win the match and later beat Korchnoi again in 1981 in the "Massacre in Merano".

=== Sztern vs. Lundquist ===
Position: e8 black rook, g8 black king, b7 black pawn, g7 black pawn, h7 black pawn, b6 black queen, d6 white pawn, c5 black pawn, e5 white knight, f5 black pawn, g5 white pawn, d4 black knight, f4 white pawn, a3 black rook, d3 white bishop, e3 white queen, h3 white pawn, b2 white pawn, b1 white king, c1 white rook

Black to make his 28th move

In this position, in a 1983 game in Australia, Rolf Lundquist, playing Black, offered his opponent Abraham Sztern a draw. Sztern asked Lundquist to make a move first. According to the rules of chess (see draw by agreement), Black must make a move in response to White's request, and the draw offer cannot be retracted. Lundquist thereupon played 28...Qxb2+!, a queen sacrifice which wins for Black on the spot (29.Kxb2 Rb3+ 30.Ka1 Ra8+ 31.Ba6 Rxa6#). Sztern was so stunned he forgot he could still accept Lundquist's draw offer, and resigned.

This blunder was published in a one-off Not the British Chess Magazine organized by GM Murray Chandler in 1984, where it was voted the blunder of the year by a team of panelists.

=== Chandler vs. Polgar ===
Position: g7 black king, e6 white king, h6 black knight, g5 white pawn, e4 white bishop, h2 white pawn

White to make his 54th move

In this example, from a tournament in Biel in 1987, the game did not result in a loss for the blunderer, but led to an embarrassing draw for the British GM Murray Chandler. In the diagram position, Chandler is completely winning. His opponent, Susan Polgar, played the wily trap 53...Ng8–h6!?. Chandler realized that after 54.gxh6+ Kxh6 he will be left with the considerable material advantage of a rook pawn and bishop against a bare king. However, since the bishop is unable to control the promotion square h8, Black will draw if she is able to get her king to control h8 due to the wrong rook pawn fortress. But Chandler calculates further, and realizes that it is he who will win control over the h8-square after 55.Kf6, and thereby win the game.

Therefore, Chandler played 54.gxh6+??, but instead of the expected 54...Kxh6, Polgar played 54...Kh8, leading to almost the same king, bishop, and rook pawn versus bare king situation as Chandler had calculated that he would avoid, and the small difference that White has two rook pawns rather than one has no effect on the result. Black controls the h8-square and cannot be chased or squeezed away from it, and so White cannot promote his pawn. After 55.Bd5 Kh7 56.Kf7 Kh8 the players agreed to a draw.

Chandler had numerous moves that would have maintained his winning position; the fastest ways to win were 54.h4 and 54.Bf5 according to the Shredder tablebase.

=== Beliavsky vs. Johannessen ===
Position: f7 black pawn, h7 black king, c6 black pawn, g6 black pawn, d5 black pawn, f5 white pawn, g5 white queen, h5 black pawn, d4 white pawn, h4 white pawn, e3 white pawn, f3 white pawn, g3 white king, b1 black queen

White to make his 69th move

This example, from a game played in Linares in 2002, is one of the very rare circumstances where a grandmaster makes the worst move possible, the only one allowing checkmate on the next move. In this queen endgame, White has some advantage after 69.fxg6+ fxg6 70.Kf4 due to Black's weak pawn on c6. Alexander Beliavsky played 69.Kf4??, however, overlooking the response 69...Qb8#. According to Leif Erlend Johannessen, it took a few moments for both players to realize that it was checkmate, and Beliavsky was a good sport over this mishap.

=== Deep Fritz vs. Kramnik ===
Position: f8 white knight, h8 black king, a7 black queen, g7 black pawn, h6 black pawn, e5 white pawn, a4 black pawn, b4 black pawn, e4 white queen, b2 white pawn, g2 white pawn, h2 white pawn, c1 black bishop, h1 white king

Black to make his 34th move

In November 2006, reigning world chess champion Vladimir Kramnik competed in the World Chess Challenge: Man vs. Machine, a six-game match against the chess computer Deep Fritz in Bonn, Germany. After the first game had ended in a draw, Kramnik, playing Black, was generally considered in a comfortable position in Game 2, and he thought so himself apparently, as he refused a draw by avoiding a potential threefold repetition on 29...Qa7. Kramnik's troubles began when he decided to play for a win and pushed his a-pawn, 31...a4. Commentators, including American grandmaster Yasser Seirawan, voiced concerns about Kramnik's intentions and the situation became more uncertain as the game went on with 32.Nxe6 Bxe3+ 33.Kh1 Bxc1 34.Nxf8, turning it into a likely draw. The game could have ended with 34...Kg8 35.Ng6 Bxb2 36.Qd5+ Kh7 37.Nf8+ Kh8 38.Ng6+.

However, Kramnik's next move, 34...Qe3?? (a move awarded "???" originally by ChessBase on a story covering Kramnik's blunder, and even "??????" by Susan Polgar), came as a big surprise and was described as possibly the "blunder of the century" and perhaps the "biggest blunder ever" by Susan Polgar, as Kramnik overlooked a mate in one. Deep Fritz immediately ended the game with 35.Qh7#. Seirawan later called Kramnik's move "a tragedy".

From ChessBase: "Kramnik played the move 34...Qe3 calmly, stood up, picked up his cup and was about to leave the stage to go to his rest room. At least one audio commentator also noticed nothing, while Fritz operator Mathias Feist kept glancing from the board to the screen and back, hardly able to believe that he had input the correct move. Fritz was displaying mate in one, and when Mathias executed it on the board, Kramnik briefly grasped his forehead, took a seat to sign the score sheet and left for the press conference." During it, he stated that he had planned the supposedly winning move 34...Qe3 already when playing 29...Qa7, and had rechecked the line after each subsequent move. After an exchange of queens, Black would win easily with his distant pawn; after 35.Qxb4 Qe2 or 35.Ng6+ Kh7 36.Nf8+ Kg8 Black also wins eventually.

Chess journalist Alexander Roshal attempted to explain the blunder by saying that the mating pattern of a queen on h7 protected by a knight on f8 is extremely rare and not contained in a grandmaster's automatic repertoire.

=== Bacrot vs. Inarkiev ===
Position: f8 black rook, g8 black knight, h8 black rook, b7 black pawn, g7 black king, a6 black pawn, c6 black pawn, d6 black pawn, h6 black pawn, f5 black queen, g5 black pawn, d4 white pawn, f3 white knight, h3 white pawn, a2 white pawn, b2 white pawn, c2 white pawn, e2 white queen, f2 white pawn, g2 white pawn, a1 white rook, c1 white bishop, g1 white king

White to make his 23rd move

This game was played in May 2008 at the Baku Grand Prix from the FIDE Grand Prix 2008–2010. In round 11, Étienne Bacrot played White against Ernesto Inarkiev. On move 23, he checked the black king with 23.Qe7+??. Both players calmly wrote down the move. Bacrot then realized that his queen was under attack by the black knight and resigned.

=== Firouzja vs. Carlsen ===
Position: d6 black king, f6 black pawn, e5 black pawn, e4 white pawn, d3 white king

White to make his 69th move

In this pawn ending (from a game in 2020, Alireza Firouzja as White, Magnus Carlsen as Black), White is a pawn down, and to hold the draw, he either needs to preserve his last pawn, or (if Black decides to play Ke6 followed by f5) bring the king close enough to the e-file and stop the king from reaching any key squares. The correct move to draw is 69.Kd2!, when 69...Kc5 70.Kc3 keeps the opposition and prevents Black from penetrating, while 69...Ke6 70.Ke3 f5 71.exf5+ Kxf5 72.Kf3 prevents the king from advancing any further and reaching a key square. Instead, White blundered with 69.Kc3?? and after 69...Kc5 White resigned, as he loses his last pawn: 70.Kb3 Kd4 or 70.Kd3 Kb4 71.Ke3 Kc4 72.Kf3 Kd4 73.Kg3 Kxe4. Thus, the position after 69.Kc3?? Kc5 is reciprocal zugzwang: if Black were to move, it would be a draw, while if White were to move, Black wins.

=== Nepomniachtchi vs. Carlsen ===
Position: d8 black rook, e8 black bishop, g8 black king, b7 white bishop, c7 black pawn, f7 black pawn, g7 black pawn, e6 black pawn, e5 white pawn, h5 black pawn, a4 black rook, c4 white pawn, g4 black knight, h4 white pawn, b3 white knight, g3 white pawn, a2 white pawn, f2 white pawn, a1 white rook, e1 white rook, g1 white king

White to make his 27th move

During the 9th game between Ian Nepomniachtchi and Magnus Carlsen in the World Chess Championship 2021, the game was equal until Nepomniachtchi played 27.c5??. This move handed the advantage to Carlsen, since after 27...c6, the White bishop on b7 is trapped and the knight on b3 cannot move to c5 to defend it. The game followed with 28.f3 Nh6 29.Re4 Ra7 30.Rb4 Rb8 31.a4 Raxb7, leaving Carlsen a bishop up. Nepomniachtchi resigned eight moves later.

Nepomniachtchi had previously blundered in game 8 and would do so again in game 11, both times losing a pawn and giving Carlsen winning positions that he converted to win the match. Chess players and commentators widely believed that Nepomniachtchi's mental state was significantly impacted by the nearly 8-hour-long game 6, and that the blunder in game 11 might have been him giving up on the match to get it over with.

=== Ding vs. Gukesh ===
Position: a8 white bishop, e6 black bishop, e5 black king, f5 black pawn, f4 white rook, g4 black pawn, g3 white pawn, b2 black rook, g1 white king

White to make his 55th move

The World Chess Championship 2024 was decided in dramatic fashion in the 14th and final game of the match due to a blunder by Ding Liren as White. Gukesh Dommaraju, playing Black, has an extra pawn but the position is even as Gukesh cannot break through and simplification to rook and pawn or rook and bishop versus rook is drawing. But on his 55th move, Ding offered a rook exchange with 55.Rf2?? that loses instantly, as 55...Rxf2 56.Kxf2 Bd5! forces a bishop exchange and simplifies the position to a king and pawn versus king endgame which is winning for Black. After 57.Bxd5 Kxd5 58.Ke3 Ke5, Ding resigned.

== Double blunders ==
Following a blunder, the opponent might not expect the move to be made and might overlook it, committing a blunder of their own and potentially missing the key vulnerability of the first blunder.

=== Ebralidze vs. Ragozin ===
Position: a7 black pawn, d7 white rook, e7 black bishop, f7 black king, h7 black pawn, g6 black pawn, c4 black rook, d4 white knight, b3 white pawn, a2 white pawn, h2 white king

Black to make his 40th move

Played at the USSR Chess Championship in 1937, held in Tbilisi, this game featured a double blunder.

Viacheslav Ragozin was planning to trade rooks with 40...Rc7 41.Rxc7 Bd6+ as this would transpose the game into a winning bishop versus knight endgame for Black. Therefore, Ragozin played 40...Rc7??, not realizing that after 41.Rxc7, the bishop would be pinned to the king, and would therefore be a full blunder of a rook.

Archil Ebralidze started to calculate, not wanting to be in a lost endgame. He, too, had not realized that after 41.Rxc7 the bishop would be pinned. After Ebralidze had thought for around 15 minutes, according to Adrian Mikhalchishin, "the crowd went literally crazy."

Someone in the audience shouted "Archil, take the rook!" Further shouts from the audience followed. Eventually, Ebralidze shouted back "I can see that, you patzers!" Ebralidze played 41.Rd5??, missing the free rook entirely.

The game continued 41...Bf6 42.Nb5 Rc2+ 43.Kg3 a6 44.Rd7+ Ke8 45.Rc7??. Ebralidze lost his rook to the bishop fork 45...Be5+, and resigned.

=== Carlsen vs. Aronian ===
Position: f8 black rook, g8 black king, c7 black pawn, g7 black pawn, b6 black pawn, c6 black pawn, e6 black knight, e5 black pawn, h5 black pawn, b4 black bishop, c4 white pawn, e4 white knight, d3 white pawn, e3 white bishop, f3 black rook, g3 white pawn, h3 black queen, c2 white pawn, f2 white pawn, h2 white pawn, a1 white rook, d1 white queen, f1 white rook, h1 white king

White to make his 27th move

The game between the world's two highest-rated players in the 2012 Grand Slam Master's final in São Paulo and Bilbao (this game was played in São Paulo) featured a double blunder. Magnus Carlsen, with White, played the tactical blunder 27.Bf4??, and saw almost immediately that this loses to 27...R8xf4!, in effect winning a piece since taking the rook gives Black a forced mate: 28.gxf4 Nxf4 (threatening Qg2#) 29.Rg1 Qxh2+ 30.Kxh2 Rh3#.

Carlsen waited for Levon Aronian to make his move, and Aronian eventually played the otherwise solid 27...Bc3??, allowing White back into the game. Aronian had seen 27...R8xf4, but playing quickly to avoid time trouble, he thought that White could strike back with 28.gxf4 Nxf4 29.Ra8+ since both 29...Kf7 and 29...Kh7 lose to the knight fork 30.Ng5+. He had missed, however, that the retreat 29...Bf8! ends White's brief counterattack and leaves White defenseless against the mate threat.

The game was eventually drawn by perpetual check on move 48.

=== Carlsen vs. Anand ===
Position: g8 black rook, h8 black rook, b7 black king, f7 black pawn, b6 black pawn, c6 black bishop, e6 black pawn, g6 black knight, h6 black pawn, a5 black pawn, c5 black pawn, e5 white pawn, h5 white rook, c4 white pawn, g4 white rook, c3 white pawn, e3 white bishop, a2 white pawn, c2 white bishop, f2 white pawn, g2 white pawn, c1 white king

White to make his 26th move

The sixth game of the World Chess Championship 2014 in Sochi between Magnus Carlsen and Viswanathan Anand also featured a double blunder. Carlsen adopted the space-gaining Maróczy Bind setup against the Kan Variation of the Sicilian Defence, and accepted a set of isolated doubled pawns in return for active play. After an early queen exchange he soon developed a commanding position and appeared to have excellent winning chances. On his 26th move Carlsen played 26.Kd2??, immediately realizing after making the move that 26...Nxe5! (with a discovered attack on the g4-rook) 27.Rxg8 Nxc4+ (zwischenzug) 28.Kd3 Nb2+ 29.Ke2 Rxg8 leads to Black picking up two extra pawns and gaining excellent winning chances. Anand, not expecting the blunder, replied with 26...a4?? in less than a minute. He, too, saw the missed tactic immediately after making his move. Carlsen made no further mistakes and converted his advantage into a win.

== Resignation in won positions ==
Sometimes players, including strong grandmasters, resign in a won position instead of a lost position. Chess historian Tim Krabbé calls this kind of mistake "the ultimate blunder".

=== Popiel vs. Marco ===
Position: h8 black king, b7 black bishop, d7 black rook, g7 black pawn, a6 black pawn, h6 black pawn, b5 black pawn, e5 black queen, f5 white knight, d4 black bishop, e4 white pawn, d3 white queen, a2 white pawn, g2 white pawn, h2 white pawn, b1 white bishop, d1 white rook, h1 white king

Black to make his 36th move

In this 1902 game between Ignatz von Popiel and Georg Marco, the black bishop on d4 is pinned to the rook on d7, and there are no additional friendly pieces to come to its defense. Seeing no way to save his bishop, Black resigned, missing 36...Bg1!, threatening ...Qxh2# and leaving no way for White to save both his queen and rook while staving off checkmate. Tim Krabbé called this the "earliest, most famous, and clearest example" of resigning with a winning position.

=== Négyesy vs. Honfi ===
Position: d8 black rook, g8 black king, a7 black pawn, b7 black pawn, e7 black pawn, f7 black pawn, h7 black pawn, e6 black queen, g5 black pawn, h5 black bishop, b4 black knight, e4 white pawn, c3 white knight, f3 white pawn, a2 white pawn, b2 white pawn, f2 white queen, g2 white pawn, h2 white pawn, b1 white king, f1 white bishop, h1 white rook

Black to make his 19th move

In this game played in Budapest in 1955 between György Négyesy and Károly Honfi, Black saw that White's c3-knight is stopping ...Rd1#. Therefore, Black played 19...Qxa2+??, deflecting the knight. White agreed and resigned. Both players overlooked that after 20.Nxa2 Rd1+, the deflected knight can still stop the mate with 21.Nc1.

=== Sanguineti vs. Najdorf ===
Position: f8 white queen, c7 white king, c6 black pawn, e6 black king, f6 black pawn, g6 black bishop, h6 black pawn, d5 black pawn, g5 black pawn, d4 white pawn, e4 black rook, g4 white pawn

White to make his 58th move

Raúl Sanguineti won playing White in this Mar del Plata tournament game in 1956. Miguel Najdorf with black pieces has a substantial material advantage, but due to Black's poor king safety, White has a forced win. Correct is 58.Qg8+ winning the bishop (58...Bf7 blocks the king's escape square on the seventh rank, allowing 59.Qd8 which leaves two mate threats, 60.Qd7# and 60.Qd6# which cannot both be prevented: 59...Rxd4 60.Qd6#; 59...Rxg4 Qd7#). Instead, White played 58.Kd8?? (threatening 59.Qe7#), thinking that it won on the spot. Miguel agreed, and resigned. Both players overlooked the defense 58...Rxg4, winning more material and allowing the black king to escape to f5. With the king on d8, White cannot play Qc8+, which would have won the rook.

=== Korchnoi vs. Van der Stricht ===
Position: g8 black rook, h8 black king, f7 black pawn, g7 black pawn, c6 black pawn, d6 black knight, e6 black queen, g6 white rook, h6 black pawn, b5 black pawn, d5 black pawn, e5 white bishop, h5 white queen, c4 black knight, d4 white pawn, c3 white pawn, d3 white bishop, f3 white pawn, a2 white pawn, f2 white pawn, g2 white king, h2 white pawn

Black to make his 36th move

In the game between Victor Korchnoi against Geert Van der Stricht, at the 2003 European Team Championship, Black seems helpless against White's kingside threats. Agreeing with this idea, Black resigned – presumably seeing 36...Nxe5! 37.Rxe6 Nxd3 (threatening 38...Nf4+ and 38...fxe6) 38.Rxh6+ gxh6 39.Qxh6#. However, he missed the fact that the White king was lined up with Black's rook, so 38...gxh6+ would have been discovered check and 39.Qxh6# is illegal. After 39.Kf1 Rg6, Black defends his h6-pawn and has a decisive material advantage.

=== Nakamura vs. Carlsen ===
Position: a8 black rook, h8 black king, a7 black pawn, h7 black knight, a6 black bishop, d6 black pawn, h6 black bishop, c5 black pawn, e5 black pawn, h5 white queen, c4 white pawn, e4 white pawn, b3 white knight, d3 white pawn, e3 black queen, h3 white knight, a2 white pawn, g2 black rook, h2 white pawn, a1 white rook, f1 white rook, h1 white king

Position after 28...Rxg2??

Position: g8 black rook, h8 black king, a7 black pawn, h7 black knight, d6 black pawn, h6 black bishop, c5 black pawn, e5 black pawn, h5 white queen, c4 white pawn, e4 white pawn, g4 black bishop, b3 white knight, d3 white pawn, f3 white rook, h3 white knight, a2 white pawn, e2 black queen, h2 white pawn, g1 white rook, h1 white king

Final position

In this 2025 game between the two highest-rated online Blitz players in the world, Magnus Carlsen mistakenly sacrificed his rook with 28...Rxg2?? (first diagram), immediately spotting the winning continuation after making the move. Hoping to confuse his opponent, Carlsen played on. He was rewarded when Hikaru Nakamura resigned following 32...Bg4 (second diagram), missing 33. Rfg3!, defending the queen by pinning the bishop to the g8-square. After 33. Rfg3 Qf3+ 34. Rxf3 Bxh5 35. Rxg8+, White is up an exchange, with a completely winning position.

== See also ==
- Back-rank checkmate
- Choke (sports)
- Kotov syndrome
- Swindle (chess)
