= Bogdan Śliwa =

Polish chess grandmaster (1922–2003)

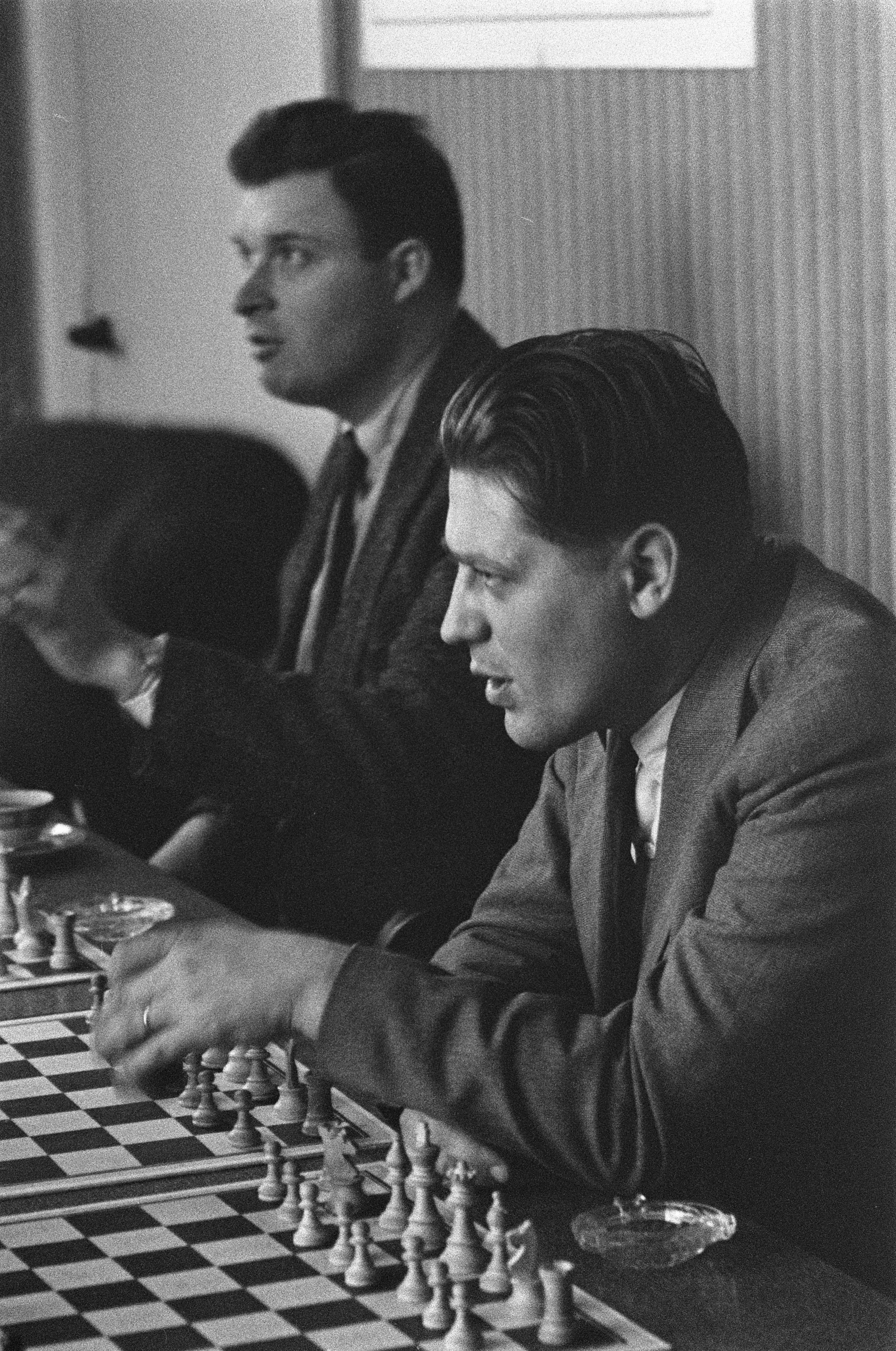
- Śliwa in 1960

Personal information
- Born: February 4, 1922 Kraków, Poland
- Died: May 16, 2003 (aged 81) Kraków, Poland

Chess career
- Country: Poland
- Title: Grandmaster (1987)
- Peak rating: 2370 (January 1979)

Bogdan Śliwa (4 February 1922 in Kraków – 16 May 2003) was a Polish chess master.

== Biography ==
Śliwa won the championship of Poland six times. In 1946, he won the first Polish Chess Championship after World War II in Sopot (5th POL-ch). In 1948, he took 3rd in Kraków (6th POL-ch; Kazimierz Makarczyk won). He won the Polish championship four consecutive times in 1951–1954. He won his last title at Wrocław 1960 (17th POL-ch).

In tournaments, Śliwa tied for 9-10th at Sopot 1951 (Ernő Gereben won). In 1952, he took 17th in Budapest (Paul Keres won). In 1954, he tied for 12-14th in Bucharest (Viktor Korchnoi won). His best achievement was 3rd, behind Luděk Pachman and László Szabó, at Mariánské Lázně (Marienbad) 1954 (zt). In 1955, he tied for 19th-21st in the Göteborg (interzonal), which David Bronstein won. In 1957, Śliwa tied for 2nd-4th with Oleg Neikirch and Alexander Matanović, behind Miroslav Filip in Sofia (zt). In 1959, he tied for 5-7th in Riga (Boris Spassky won). In 1962, he tied for 4-7th in Mariánské Lázně (Mark Taimanov won). In 1965, he tied for 12-14th in Belgrade (Milan Matulović won). In 1966, he took 9th in Polanica Zdrój (Vasily Smyslov won). In 1966, he tied for 9-10th in Tel Aviv (Svetozar Gligorić won).

One of Śliwa's most famous games is his win over Bronstein in the Immortal losing game.

He played for Poland in seven Chess Olympiads:

- In 1952, at fourth board in the 10th Chess Olympiad in Helsinki (+7 –1 =4);
- In 1956, at first board in the 12th Chess Olympiad in Moscow (+6 –4 =6);
- In 1958, at first board in the 13th Chess Olympiad in Munich (+6 –6 =5);
- In 1960, at first board in the 14th Chess Olympiad in Leipzig (+5 –5 =6);
- In 1962, at first board in the 15th Chess Olympiad in Varna (+7 –4 =5);
- In 1964, at third board in the 16th Chess Olympiad in Tel Aviv (+6 –2 =6);
- In 1966, at fourth board in the 17th Chess Olympiad in Havana (+7 –3 =5).

He won the individual silver medal at Helsinki 1952.

FIDE awarded Śliwa the International Master title in 1953, and the Honorary Grandmaster title in 1987.
