= Weaver W. Adams =

American chess player and author

Weaver Adams
Personal information
- Full name: Weaver Warren Adams
- Born: April 28, 1901 Dedham, Massachusetts, U.S.
- Died: January 6, 1963 (aged 61) Cedar Grove, New Jersey, U.S.

Chess career
- Country: United States
- Title: National Master

Weaver Warren Adams (April 28, 1901 – January 6, 1963) was an American chess master, author, and opening theoretician. His greatest competitive achievement was winning the U.S. Open Championship in 1948. He played in the U.S. Championship five times.

Adams is most famous for his controversial claim that the first move 1.e4 confers a winning advantage upon White. He continually advocated this theory in books and magazine articles from 1939 until shortly before his death. Adams' claim has generally been scorned by the chess world. However, International Master Hans Berliner in a 1999 book professed admiration for Adams, and similarly claimed that White may claim a winning advantage, albeit with 1.d4, not 1.e4.

Adams did not succeed in showing the validity of his theory in his own tournament and match play. His results suffered because he published his analysis of White's supposed winning lines, thus forfeiting the element of surprise and enabling his opponents to prepare responses to his pet lines. Future World Champion Bobby Fischer used the Adams Attack, the line Adams advocated against the Najdorf Variation of the Sicilian Defense (6.h3), with success.

== Playing career ==
Weaver Adams was one of the leading American masters during the 1930s and 1940s. He played in the U.S. Championship in 1936, 1940, 1944, 1946, and 1948. He won the Massachusetts State Championship in 1937, 1938, 1941, and 1945. In 1944, he won a master tournament in Ventnor City. He also won the Marshall Chess Club championship six times, and the New York State championship four times.

Adams' greatest competitive success was winning the 49th U.S. Open, held in Baltimore in 1948, for which achievement he appeared on the cover of the August 1948 issue of Chess Review magazine. Adams played in the 1950–51 Hastings Christmas Chess Congress, but finished 9th out of 10 players with 2½/9 (two wins, six losses, one draw).

Grandmaster Larry Evans wrote that Adams' "tournament results were damaged by his dogmatism. Playing under the self-inflicted handicap of arming his opponents with advance knowledge of his 'best' lines, he felt honor-bound to steer straight into them even though his adversary invariably had a cook up his sleeve. By the time Weaver found a refutation and published it, another player found a different cook and so on ad infinitum." According to Chess Review, this phenomenon may explain Adams' poor result at Hastings 1950–51.

== White to play and win theory ==
Position: a8 black rook, b8 black knight, c8 black bishop, d8 black queen, e8 black king, f8 black bishop, g8 black knight, h8 black rook, a7 black pawn, b7 black pawn, c7 black pawn, d7 black pawn, e7 black pawn, f7 black pawn, g7 black pawn, h7 black pawn, e4 white pawn, a2 white pawn, b2 white pawn, c2 white pawn, d2 white pawn, f2 white pawn, g2 white pawn, h2 white pawn, a1 white rook, b1 white knight, c1 white bishop, d1 white queen, e1 white king, f1 white bishop, g1 white knight, h1 white rook

After 1.e4, "White ought to win", according to Adams.

Adams was best known for his books and magazine articles in which he claimed and attempted to prove that White's first-move advantage is decisive, i.e. that White has a forced win from the starting position. His first and most famous book arguing this, White to Play and Win, was published in 1939. There, Adams claimed that 1.e4 was White's strongest move, and that if both sides played the best moves thereafter, "White ought to win." If Black responded with 1 ... e5, Adams advocated the Bishop's Opening, 1.e4 e5 2.Bc4.

Adams was unable to prove his theory in tournament or match practice. The year after his book was published, he played in the U.S. Open at Dallas, 1940. Ironically, in the finals he did not win a single game as White (three losses and one draw), but won all four of his games as Black. Adams also lost a match to IM I.A. Horowitz, who took the black pieces in every game.

Adams later wrote Simple Chess, which he revised several times; How to Play Chess; and Absolute Chess. Ultimately giving up on the Bishop's Opening, he switched to the Vienna Game, claiming a win with White after 1.e4 e5 2.Nc3 Nf6 3.Bc4 Nxe4 4.Qh5 Nd6 5.Bb3 Nc6 6.Nb5, a sharp line that has since been dubbed the Frankenstein–Dracula Variation.

When Adams was also unsuccessful with this variation, he switched to other lines. In 1962, he advocated what he called the Adams Gambit, substituting 6.d4!? for 6.Nb5. He explained his repudiation of 6.Nb5: "it is antipositional to move a developed piece a second time, and masters have long given it up as hopeless."

Adams' "White to Play and Win" thesis was widely ridiculed. Larry Evans wrote that "Mr. Adams and his cronies may be linked to the radical right wing of chess. ... Weaver is not content with such halfway measures as equality. All or nothing—right-wing logic, true to form."

However, IM Hans Berliner, a former world champion of correspondence chess, wrote that Adams' "theories, though looked upon with scorn by most top chess players, made an immediate and lasting impression on me. Weaver W. Adams was the first person I met who actually had theories about how chess should be played." Berliner is himself a controversial figure, who argued in his 1999 book The System, that 1.d4 may win by force for White.

Although Adams was rarely successful at the top levels, his ideas were studied and sometimes adopted by strong players. Future world champion Bobby Fischer scored notable wins using the Adams Attack against the Najdorf Variation of the Sicilian Defense: 1.e4 c5 2.Nf3 d6 3.d4 cxd4 4.Nxd4 Nf6 5.Nc3 a6 6.h3!?, preparing the pawn thrust g2–g4, and that line continues to be played at the top level today.

== Personal life ==
Adams' parents were Frank H. Adams and Ethel Weaver Adams. He wrote that he was not directly related to Presidents John Adams and John Quincy Adams, but that the Adamses "in and about Massachusetts are mostly of the same family, deriving from a Henry Adams who landed in Braintree in 1644". Both Weaver and Warren were his ancestral names. His mother's side has been traced back to the founding fathers of America. His father's side has not as yet been established.

Adams was homosexual, as discussed in his autobiographical article reprinted in Chess Pride.

== Notable games ==
Here is a game Adams won using the Albin Counter Gambit, a favorite of his, against National Master Erich Marchand, after White made an oversight on move 13. [Notes from Chess Review.]

Marchand vs. Adams, U.S. Open 1941
1. d4 d5 2. c4 e5 3. dxe5 d4 4. Nf3 Nc6 5. a3 a5 6. g3 Be6 7. b3 Bc5 8. Bg2 Nge7 9. 0-0 Ng6 10. Bb2 Ngxe5 11. Nxe5 Nxe5 12. e3 Bg4!? 13. f3?? After 13.Qd2!, it is difficult to see how Black would hold the position together. 13... dxe3! 14. Qe2 Black threatened 14...e2+. 14... Nxf3+! 15. Kh1 If 15.Bxf3, 15...Bxf3 16.Rxf3 (16.Qxf3 e2+) Qd1+!! 17.Qxd1 e2+ wins. 15... Nxh2 16. Qc2 Nxf1 17. Qe4+ Qe7 18. Qxg4 e2 19. Nd2 f5 20. Qh5+ g6 21. Qh6 Nxg3+ 22. Kh2 Nh5 23. Ne4 Qh4+ 24. Bh3 fxe4 25. Be5 Rf8 0–1
