= First-move advantage =

First-move advantage may refer to:

- First-move advantage in chess
- First-mover advantage, a strategy in marketing

== See also ==
- Komidashi, a compensation for first-move advantage in Go
