= Joseph Bertin =

Personal information
- Born: Joseph Bertin; 1690s
- Died: c. 1736

Chess career
- Country: France; England

Captain Joseph Bertin (c. 1690 – c. 1736) was one of the first authors to write about the game of chess. David Hooper and Kenneth Whyld in The Oxford Companion to Chess call his book The Noble Game of Chess "the first worthwhile chess book in the English language". B. Goulding Brown, writing in the December 1932 British Chess Magazine, called it the first original English chess book.

Bertin was a Huguenot born at Castelmoron-sur-Lot in the 1690s. He came to England during his youth, became a naturalized citizen in 1713, and married in 1719. In 1726, he joined a line regiment serving in the West Indies. He was later promoted to the rank of Captain, and ultimately was released from the Army as an invalid. In 1735 he published a small volume entitled The Noble Game of Chess. In the same year, he was recommissioned in a Regiment of Invalids and, according to Hooper and Whyld, "In all probability he died soon afterwards."

The Noble Game of Chess was sold only at Slaughter's Coffee House. It contained opening analysis and useful advice about the middlegame, and laid down 19 rules for chess play. Most of them are still useful today. Some examples:

"2. Never play your Queen, till your game is tolerably well opened, that you may not lose any moves; and a game well opened gives a good situation."
"3. You must not give useless checks, for the same reason."
"8. Consider well before you play, what harm your adversary is able to do to you, that you may oppose his designs."
"18. To play well the latter end of a game, you must calculate who has the move, on which the game always depends." (This is a reference to zugzwang.)

Bertin attached great value to maintaining White's first-move advantage. The book also contained 26 games, with each variation analyzed being treated as a separate game. They were divided into "gambets" and "the close-game".

== Problem ==
Position: a8 black bishop, c8 black rook, d8 black king, e8 black rook, c7 black bishop, e7 black pawn, f7 black knight, a6 white rook, d6 black pawn, e6 white queen, e5 white pawn, f5 black pawn, h5 black pawn, a4 white knight, d4 white pawn, f4 white pawn, b3 white knight, e3 black queen, g3 black pawn, h3 white pawn, g2 white pawn, d1 white bishop, f1 white king

Bertin, White to play and win

Position: c8 black rook, e8 black rook, c7 black bishop, e7 black pawn, f7 black knight, a6 white rook, c6 white bishop, e6 black king, d5 white pawn, e5 white pawn, f5 black pawn, h5 black pawn, f4 white pawn, e3 black queen, g3 black pawn, h3 white pawn, g2 white pawn, f1 white king

Bertin, final position

At left is a chess problem from page 54 of Bertin's book. White wins with 1.Qd7+! Kxd7 2.Nbc5+ Kd8 3.Ne6+ Kd7 4.Nac5+ dxc5 5.Nxc5+ Ke8 6.Ne6+ Kd7 7.Ba4+ Bc6 8.Bxc6+ Kxe6 9.d5#.
