= First-move advantage in chess =

Advantage of White over Black in chess

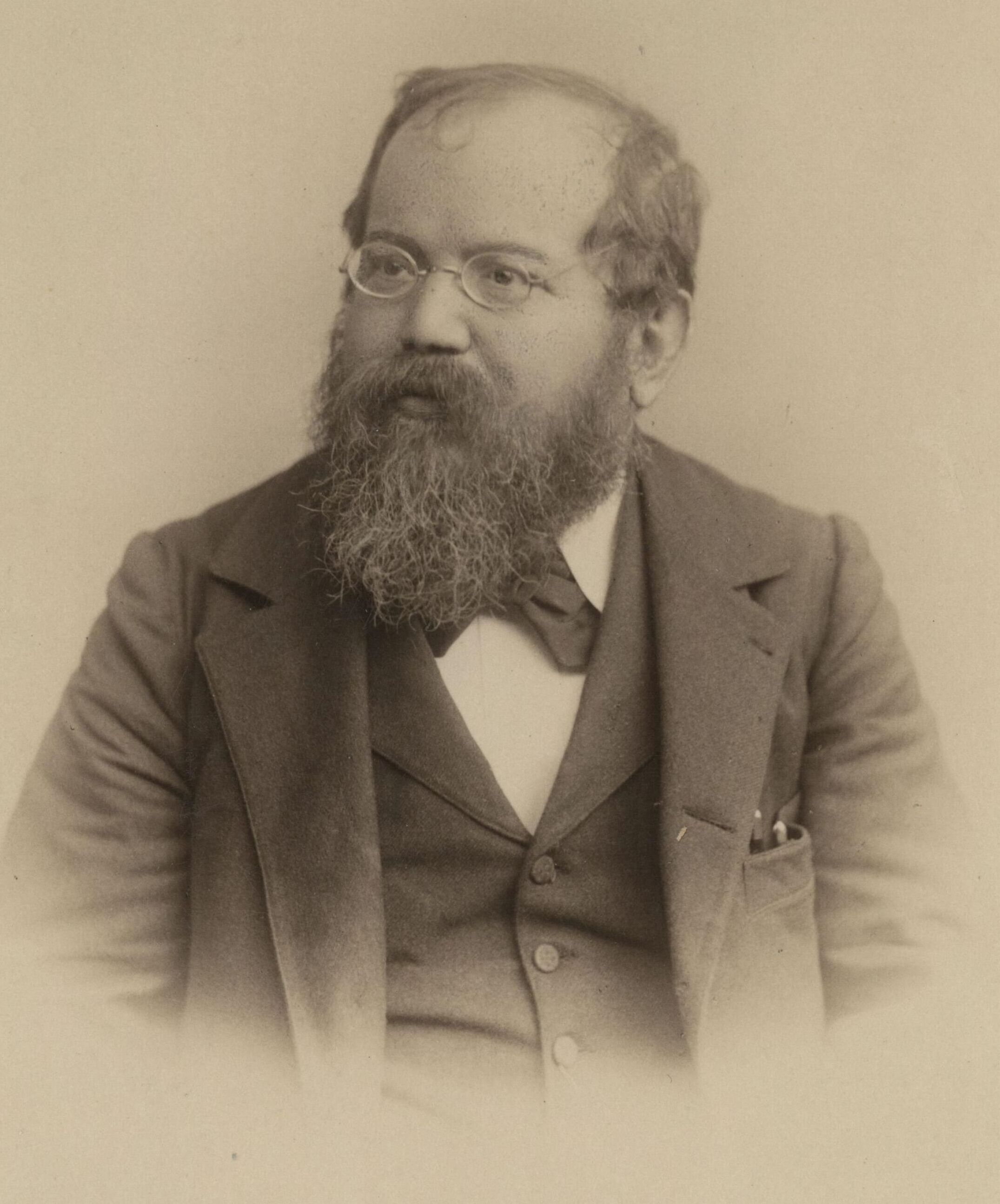
Wilhelm Steinitz, who in 1889 claimed chess is a draw with best play

In chess, there is a consensus among players and theorists that the player who makes the first move (White) has an inherent advantage, albeit not one large enough to win with perfect play. This has been the consensus since at least 1889, when the first World Chess Champion, Wilhelm Steinitz, addressed the issue, although chess has not been solved.

Since 1851, compiled statistics support this view; White consistently wins slightly more often than Black, usually achieving a winning percentage between 52 and 56 percent. (Note: White's overall winning percentage is calculated by taking the percentage of games won by White plus half the percentage of drawn games. Thus, if out of 100 games White wins 40, draws 32, and loses 28, White's total winning percentage is 40 plus half of 32, i.e. 56 percent.) White's advantage is less significant in blitz games and games between lower-level players, and becomes greater as the level of play rises; however, raising the level of play also increases the percentage of draws. As the standard of play rises, all the way up to top engine level, the number of decisive games approaches zero, and the proportion of White wins among those decisive games approaches 100%.

Some players, including world champions such as José Raúl Capablanca, Emanuel Lasker, Bobby Fischer, and Vladimir Kramnik, have expressed fears of a "draw death" as chess becomes more deeply analyzed, and opening preparation becomes ever more important. To alleviate this danger, Capablanca, Fischer, and Kramnik proposed chess variants to revitalize the game, while Lasker suggested changing how draws and stalemates are scored. Several of these suggestions have been tested with engines: in particular, Larry Kaufman and Arno Nickel's extension of Lasker's idea – scoring being stalemated, bare king, and causing a threefold repetition as quarter-points – shows by far the greatest reduction of draws among the options tested, and Fischer random chess (known today more extensively as Chess960), which obviates preparation by randomising the starting array, has obtained significant uptake at top level.

Some writers have challenged the view that White has an inherent advantage. András Adorján wrote a series of books on the theme that "Black is OK!", arguing that the general perception that White has an advantage is founded more in psychology than reality. Though computer analysis disagrees with his wider claim, it agrees with Adorján that some openings are better than others for Black, and thoughts on the relative strengths of openings have long informed the opening choices in games between top players. Mihai Șubă and others contend that sometimes White's initiative disappears for no apparent reason as a game progresses. The prevalent style of play for Black today is to seek unbalanced, dynamic positions with active counterplay, rather than merely trying to equalize. Modern writers also argue that Black has certain countervailing advantages. The consensus that White should try to win can be a psychological burden for the White player, who sometimes loses by trying too hard to win. Some symmetrical openings (i.e. those where Black's moves mirror White's) can lead to situations where moving first is a detriment, for either psychological or objective reasons.

== Winning percentages ==
	White wins	Drawn	Black wins	Total score for White
Tournaments; 1851–1878	45.52%	14.07%	40.41%	52.55%
Tournaments; 1881–1914	36.89%	31.76%	31.35%	52.77%
Tournaments; 1919–1932	36.98%	36.98%	26.04%	55.47%
Tournaments overall 1851–1932	38.12%	30.56%	31.31%	53.40%
New in Chess database 2000	N/A	N/A	N/A	54.8%
World Blitz Chess; Championship 2009	38.96%	26.41%	34.63%	52.16%
CEGT chess engines results (40/120) 2009	34.7%	41.3%	24.0%	55.4%
Chessgames.com database 2015	37.50%	34.90%	27.60%	54.95%

In 1946, W.F. Streeter examined the results of 5,598 games played in 45 international chess tournaments between 1851 and 1932. Streeter found that overall White scored 53.4% (W: 38.12; D: 30.56; L: 31.31). (Note: The letters W, D, and L refer to the percentage of games won, drawn, and lost, respectively.) White scored 52.55% in 1851–1878 (W:45.52; D: 14.07; L: 40.41), 52.77% in 1881–1914 (W: 36.89; D: 31.76; L: 31.35), and 55.47% in 1919–1932 (W: 36.98; D: 36.98; L: 26.04). Streeter concluded, "It thus appears that it is becoming increasingly difficult to win with Black, but somewhat easier to draw."

Two decades later, statistician Arthur M. Stevens concluded in The Blue Book of Charts to Winning Chess, based on a survey of 56,972 master games that he completed in 1967, that White scores 59.1%. However, Stevens assembled his games from those that had been published in chess magazines, rather than complete collections of all the games played in particular events.

More recent sources indicate that White scores approximately 54 to 56 percent. In 2005, Grandmaster (GM) Jonathan Rowson wrote that "the conventional wisdom is that White begins the game with a small advantage and, holding all other factors constant, scores approximately 56% to Black's 44%". International Master (IM) John Watson wrote in 1998 that White had scored 56% for most of the 20th century, but that this figure had recently slipped to 55%. The website Chessgames.com holds regularly updated statistics on its games database. As of January 12, 2015, White had won 37.50%, 34.90% were drawn, and Black had won 27.60% out of 739,769 games, resulting in a total White winning percentage of 54.95%.

New In Chess observed in its 2000 Yearbook that of the 731,740 games in its database, White scored 54.8% overall; with the two most popular opening moves, White scored 54.1% in 349,855 games beginning 1.e4 (moving the king's pawn two spaces forward), and 56.1% in 296,200 games beginning 1.d4 (moving the queen's pawn two spaces forward). The main reason that 1.e4 was less effective than 1.d4 was the Sicilian Defence (1.e4 c5), which gave White only a 52.3% score in 145,996 games. (Since then, 1.e4 e5 has replaced 1.e4 c5 as the top choice among the best players by 2021, due to analytical advances in favour of Black's chances in the Open Game and against them in the Sicilian.)

Statistician Jeff Sonas, in examining data from 266,000 games played between 1994 and 2001, concluded that White scored 54.1767% plus 0.001164 times White's Elo rating advantage, treating White's rating advantage as +390 if it is better than +390, or −460 if it is worse than −460. He found that White's advantage is equivalent to 35 rating points, i.e. if White has a rating 35 points below Black's, each player will have an expected score of 50%. Sonas also found that White's advantage is smaller (53%) in rapid games than in games at a slower ("classical") time control. In the 462 games played at the 2009 World Blitz Chess Championship, White scored only 52.16% (W38.96 D26.41 L34.63).

Other writers conclude that there is a positive correlation between the players' ratings and White's score. According to GM Evgeny Sveshnikov, statistics show that White has no advantage over Black in games between beginners, but "if the players are stronger, White has the lead". An analysis of the results of games in ChessBase's Mega 2003 database between players with similar Elo ratings, commissioned by GM András Adorján, showed that as the players' ratings went up, the percentage of draws increased, the proportion of decisive games that White won increased, and White's overall winning percentage increased. For example, taking the highest and lowest of Adorján's rating categories of 1669 games played by the highest-rated players (Elo ratings 2700 and above), White scored 55.7% overall (W26.5 D58.4 L15.2), whereas of 34,924 games played by the lowest-rated players (Elo ratings below 2100), White scored 53.1% overall (W37.0 D32.1 L30.8). Adorján also analyzed the results of games played at World Championship matches. Of 755 games played in 34 matches between 1886 and 1990, White won 234 (31.0%), drew 397 (52.6%), and lost 124 (16.4%), for a total white winning percentage of 57.3%. In the last five matches in Adorján's survey, all between Anatoly Karpov and Garry Kasparov, White won 31 (25.8%), drew 80 (66.7%), and lost 9 (7.5%), for a total white winning percentage of 59.2%. Since then, the draw percentage in World Championship games has increased further; notably, in the World Chess Championship 2018 between Magnus Carlsen and Fabiano Caruana, all classical games were drawn.

GM Larry Kaufman notes that in amateur games, the draw rate is low, but rises above 50% (in classical games) at the master level: in 2017 and 2018, the draw rate of players rated over 2750 surpassed 70%. In top-level correspondence chess (where engine assistance is allowed), the draw rate is much higher. Of 1512 games played in the World Correspondence Championship finals and the Candidates' sections between 2010 and 2013, 82.3% ended in a draw. Since that time, the draw rate in top-level correspondence play has been rising steadily, reaching 97% in 2019. Regarding computer play, Kaufman wrote: "As the level soars past 3000, the percentage of decisive games drops ever closer to zero, while the percentage of White wins among those decisive games approaches 100. This is why engine vs. engine tournaments and rating lists have to use arbitrarily chosen openings (playing each side once) to keep things interesting."

In 2017 AlphaZero, playing 100 games against Stockfish, won 25 and drew 25 as White, but won 3 and drew 47 as Black.

== Drawn with best play ==
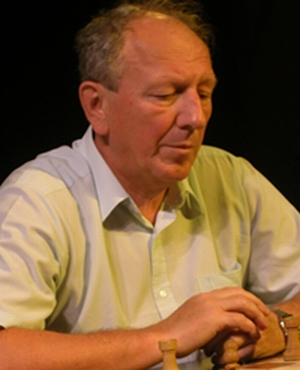
Evgeny Sveshnikov, who in 1994 claimed that White must play to win, while Black must play to draw

Joseph Bertin wrote in his 1735 textbook The Noble Game of Chess, "He that plays first, is understood to have the attack." This is consistent with the traditional view that White, by virtue of the first move, begins with the initiative and should try to extend it into the middlegame, while Black should strive to neutralize White's initiative and attain equality. Because White begins with the initiative, a minor mistake by White generally leads only to loss of the initiative, while a similar mistake by Black may have more serious consequences. Thus, Sveshnikov wrote in 1994, "Black players cannot afford to make even the slightest mistake ... from a theoretical point of view, the tasks of White and Black in chess are different: White has to strive for a win, Black—for a draw!" Kaufman gives Black slightly more scope for errors: he writes "if White plays a good opening, and Black wastes a move very early, Black can probably still draw if he plays perfectly thereafter, but a second pointless move should lose".

Chess theorists have long debated how enduring White's initiative is and whether, if both sides play perfectly, the game should end in a win for White or a draw. François-André Danican Philidor was of the opinion that White's first-move advantage should be sufficient to win. However, his contemporaries who wrote the Traité des Amateurs (published in 1786) disagreed: they wrote that White's advantage is not enough to win, that the result of a perfect game should be a draw, and that Black would seize the advantage if White made a mistake. George Walker wrote in 1846 that, "The first move is an advantage, ... but if properly answered, the first move is of little worth". Steinitz, the first World Champion, who is widely considered the father of modern chess, wrote in 1889, "It is now conceded by all experts that by proper play on both sides the legitimate issue of a game ought to be a draw." Lasker and Capablanca, the second and third World Champions, agreed. Reuben Fine, one of the world's leading players from 1936 to 1951, wrote that White's opening advantage is too intangible to be sufficient for a win without an error by Black.

The view that a game of chess should end in a draw given best play prevails. Even if it cannot be proved, this assumption is considered "safe" by Rowson and "logical" by Adorján. Watson agrees that "the proper result of a perfectly played chess game ... is a draw. ... Of course, I can't prove this, but I doubt that you can find a single strong player who would disagree. ... I remember Kasparov, after a last-round draw, explaining to the waiting reporters: 'Well, chess is a draw.'" Eleventh World Champion Bobby Fischer thought that "it's almost definite that the game is a draw theoretically". Similarly, British grandmaster and World Championship challenger Nigel Short wrote that "... with perfect play, God versus God ... chess is a draw".

Today some of the sharpest opening variations have been analyzed so deeply that they are often used as drawing weapons. For example, at the highest levels, Black often uses the Marshall Attack in the Ruy Lopez. In this line Black sacrifices a pawn for strong attacking chances, to obtain an endgame where Black is still a pawn down but is able to draw with correct play.

The perfect game? Vallejo Pons vs. Kasparov, 2004

Position: a8 black rook, b8 black knight, c8 black bishop, e8 black king, f8 black bishop, h8 black rook, b7 black pawn, f7 black pawn, g7 black pawn, h7 black pawn, a6 black pawn, d6 black pawn, e6 black pawn, f6 black knight, g5 white bishop, d4 white knight, e4 white pawn, f4 white pawn, a3 black queen, c3 white knight, a2 white pawn, c2 white pawn, d2 white queen, g2 white pawn, h2 white pawn, b1 white rook, e1 white king, f1 white bishop, h1 white rook

Position after 9...Qa3

Position: c8 black bishop, h8 black king, f7 white queen, h7 black pawn, a6 black pawn, c6 black pawn, e6 black pawn, f6 black pawn, e5 black pawn, c3 white king, g3 white rook, f2 black queen, g2 white pawn, h2 white pawn

Final position

In 2007, GMs Kiril Georgiev and Atanas Kolev asserted that much the same was true of the so-called Poisoned Pawn Variation of the Najdorf Sicilian, which arises after 1.e4 c5 2.Nf3 d6 3.d4 cxd4 4.Nxd4 Nf6 5.Nc3 a6 6.Bg5 e6 7.f4 Qb6!? This has long been considered one of the sharpest and most problematic, or even foolhardy, opening lines. The game usually continues 8.Qd2 Qxb2 9.Rb1 Qa3. Georgiev and Kolev stated that 6.Bg5 is seldom seen at the highest level because the main line of this variation leads, with best play, to a draw by perpetual check. They wrote that the following game "will probably remain the last word of theory":

Francisco Vallejo Pons vs. Garry Kasparov, Moscow 2004; Poisoned Pawn Variation
1. e4 c5 2. Nf3 d6 3. d4 cxd4 4. Nxd4 Nf6 5. Nc3 a6 6. Bg5 e6 7. f4 Qb6 8. Qd2 Qxb2 9. Rb1 Qa3 10. f5 Nc6 11. fxe6 fxe6 12. Nxc6 bxc6 13. e5 dxe5 14. Bxf6 gxf6 15. Ne4 Qxa2 16. Rd1 Be7 17. Be2 0-0 18. 0-0 Ra7 19. Rf3 Kh8 20. Rg3 Rd7 21. Qh6 Rf7 22. Qh5 Rxd1+ 23. Bxd1 Qa5 24. Kf1 Qd8 25. Qxf7 Qxd1+ 26. Kf2 Qxc2+ 27. Kf3 Qd1+ 28. Kf2 Qc2+ 29. Ke3 Bc5+ 30. Nxc5 Qxc5+ 31. Kd2 Qf2+ 32. Kc3 Qd4+ 33. Kc2 Qf2+ 34. Kc3 ½–½ (After 34...Qd4+, White cannot escape the checks.)

Georgiev and Kolev's pessimistic assessment of 6.Bg5 has since been called into question, however, as White succeeded with 10.e5 (another critical line) in several later high-level games. GM Zaven Andriasyan wrote in 2013 that after 10.f5, "a forced draw results", but that after 10.e5, "we reach a very sharp position, with mutual chances."

=== Draw death and proposed rule changes ===
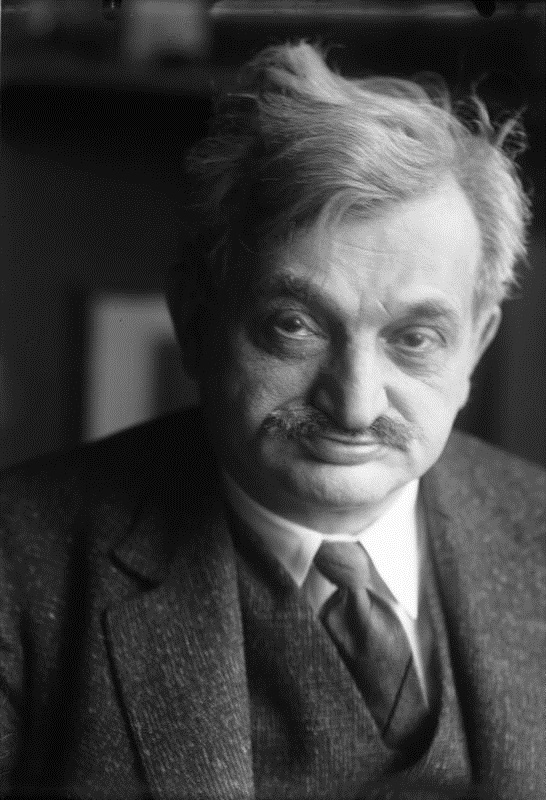
Emanuel Lasker, the second World Champion. To avoid draw death, he suggested that stalemate and bare king (king and minor piece versus king) should be scored as ¾–¼ rather than draws; Kaufman and Nickel suggest that an extension of this to score creating a threefold repetition as a ¼ point would be enough to dramatically reduce the draw problem.

Lasker and Capablanca both worried that chess would suffer a "draw death" as top-level players drew more and more of their games. More recently, Fischer considered that this had happened, saying that the game has become played out. Fourteenth World Champion Vladimir Kramnik agreed, writing: "From my own experience, I know how difficult it has become to force a complex and interesting fight if your opponent wants to play it safe. As soon as one side chooses a relatively sterile line of play, the opponent is forced to follow suit, leading to an unoriginal game and an inevitably drawish outcome."

These problems could be addressed by playing rapid instead of classical, as draws become much less common and the higher error rate means that preparation is less important: Larry Kaufman estimates that "the quality of play in fast rapid, say 10+2, is about 200 Elo below classical play". This is already done for xiangqi (Chinese chess), which is even more drawish than chess (because the elephants and advisors cannot cross the river and are hence relegated to defense only). However, this is impossible for correspondence chess, and brings a philosophical problem: Kaufman writes "For many chess players the beauty of the game is in the search for truth, and if allowing enough time to find the truth about positions makes for too many draws or makes preparation too critical that's a huge problem".

The preparation issue has also become more important in recent years; in the past, opening preparation meant the top players had to analyse by themselves, but now they only need to consult engines. Kaufman writes that "to a significant degree", the games of the top players are not "human play, but the play of engines with the humans merely choosing which engine they want to follow".

Rules prohibiting an early draw by agreement have been tried, but they do not address the problem, which is that chess is drawish enough at high levels that draws are too common even if one or both players is playing to win. Lasker, Capablanca, Fischer, and Kramnik all advocated changing the rules of chess to minimize the number of drawn games. Lasker suggested that stalemate or king and minor piece versus king (with the superior side to move) should receive ¾ of a point instead of being a draw, and was supported by Richard Réti. (This rewards the side that would have often been considered the winner in shatranj, and thus has a historical precedent.) More recently, correspondence chess grandmaster Arno Nickel has also favoured this idea and tested it in correspondence play: a form of it, giving a ¾–¼ result for stalemate only, has even been rated by FIDE. Kaufman and Nickel advocate extending Lasker's idea to scoring threefold repetition as ¾–¼ as well. This means penalising the player who brings about the repetition with only a quarter-point, even if the other side is forcing the repetition. This has similarities to the East Asian variants xiangqi (Chinese chess) and shogi (Japanese chess), as well as the game of Go, where repetition is forbidden either absolutely or under certain circumstances. (Shogi has a very low draw rate of about 1–2%, and under some rule sets used in some amateur events, draws are completely eliminated.) Kaufman does concede that this is a "much more extreme idea" than simply penalising perpetual check (which is more like the East Asian rules), but argues for it nonetheless because engine-play experiments show that most repetition draws occur when any other move would lead to a position that is not clearly drawn.

Kaufman has tested these ideas regarding the scoring of draws with the engine Komodo, and found the following results: chess at the level of a human World Championship match would have a draw rate of 65.6%; scoring stalemate as ¾–¼ reduces the draw rate to 63.4%; scoring stalemate and bare king as ¾–¼ brings it to 55.9%; and scoring stalemate, bare king, and threefold repetition as ¾–¼ brings it all the way down to 22.6%. Kaufman and Nickel thus argue that this last extension of Lasker's rule "is the simplest and most acceptable way to reduce draws dramatically without fundamentally changing the game." (The same reduction of draws would occur if stalemate, bare king, and threefold repetition were scored as 1–0 instead of ¾–¼, but the point of the ¾–¼ scoring is to allow the weaker side to still benefit from avoiding checkmate, while giving the stronger side something to play for even when checkmate cannot be attained.) The remaining draws would mostly be by the fifty-move rule; Kaufman notes that even these could be similarly addressed by giving ¾ of a point to the last player who captured or played a pawn move, but considers this too radical, noting that "it really does change the game drastically".

Capablanca in 1926 proposed Capablanca Chess, a chess variant played on a larger 10×10 board and with additional pieces (the chancellor and archbishop, moving as rook–knight and bishop–knight combinations respectively in the same way the queen could be said to be a rook–bishop combination). (He later changed his proposal to a 10×8 board.) Other masters were not in agreement with Capablanca's proposal. In 1928, Max Euwe (who later became the fifth World Champion) replied to Capablanca's proposal to the effect that he thought that changes were unnecessary, but that he was in agreement with Lasker and Réti that reevaluating stalemate and considering bare king as a victory "would do the game no harm". Siegbert Tarrasch and Akiba Rubinstein were against Capablanca's modifications. The fourth World Champion Alexander Alekhine considered in 1933 that chess did not need any changes at the time, but that combining "the best features" of the Asian varieties of chess with Western chess "would be a more natural evolution than adding new squares and pieces, or some of the other changes that have been proposed". In 1936, Capablanca advocated scoring two-thirds or three-quarters points for a stalemate, saying that that change would be enough to address the problem of the game being played out.

Position: a8 black knight, b8 black knight, c8 black rook, d8 black king, e8 black bishop, f8 black rook, g8 black queen, h8 black bishop, a7 black pawn, b7 black pawn, c7 black pawn, d7 black pawn, e7 black pawn, f7 black pawn, g7 black pawn, h7 black pawn, a2 white pawn, b2 white pawn, c2 white pawn, d2 white pawn, e2 white pawn, f2 white pawn, g2 white pawn, h2 white pawn, a1 white knight, b1 white knight, c1 white rook, d1 white king, e1 white bishop, f1 white rook, g1 white queen, h1 white bishop

One of the 960 possible setups of Fischerandom Chess, a commonly-played variant that reduces draws in human play.

Fischer advocated Fischerandom Chess, another chess variant, in which the initial position of the pieces is determined at random and identical for both players, subject to the constraints that the bishops be on opposite colours and that the king stand between the rooks. (Randomising the starting position has a long history: in 1792, Philip Julius van Zuylen van Nijevelt already advocated it as a solution to obviate the advantage of preparation.) In 2021, Larry Kaufman wrote that he considered the case for Fischerandom "very strong as the draw reduction is sizeable, memorization is almost eliminated, and the game already has strong support, being recognized by FIDE and quite popular among the top players." However, he added that while he supported Fischerandom for human play, it is still insufficient at reducing draws for computer play. Kaufman also wrote that his and Nickel's extension of the Lasker rule could be combined with Fischerandom in order to solve both draw death and opening preparation.

Kramnik has also advocated changes to the rules of chess, such as No Castling Chess where castling is forbidden. At one point, Kramnik advocated an alternative solution to avoid the issue of openings being prepared to extreme depth with engines: using the normal starting position, but choosing openings by lot or at random from a preselected list. Computer tournaments are run this way, though with two games per chosen opening, so that each player plays White once: this arrangement with two games per chosen opening was advocated in 1928 by Frank Marshall.

Other ideas have also been suggested, such as the "football scoring": 0 for a loss, 1 for a draw, and 3 for a win, which is equivalent to giving players a third of a point each for a draw rather than half. This has been criticised, however. Kaufman argues that this solution misses the point: it reduces the incentive to draw, but the reason for the high draw rate is not one of incentives, but rather that White's first-move advantage is not enough to win. Thus Kaufman calls this solution "terrible", going against "the very nature of the game": he writes that "The inferior side should be trying to draw, and to penalize Black for obtaining a good result is crazy. It makes chess like a game of 'chicken'; who will 'blink' first and play an unsound move to avoid the mutually bad result of a draw?" Nickel has likewise criticised this idea as "wholly inadequate", creating "an artificial and empty pressure at best", and creating unfairness and incentivising "game manipulations" in team events or double round-robins. In this format, players are simply incentivised to trade wins with each other rather than agree to draws, and players have an easier time cheating as a team. (A team of players enters an open event; one of them is selected to obtain the maximum score and portion of the prize fund, and the others throw their games to that player; the prize is then shared among the team. This is easier to do when a win earns more points.) Kaufman speaks more favourably of an idea by Ed Epp, which is to score draws as 0.4–0.6, equalising the expected score for White and Black; but while he writes that he is "all for this idea", he also admits that "the benefit would be small, most games would have the same outcome".

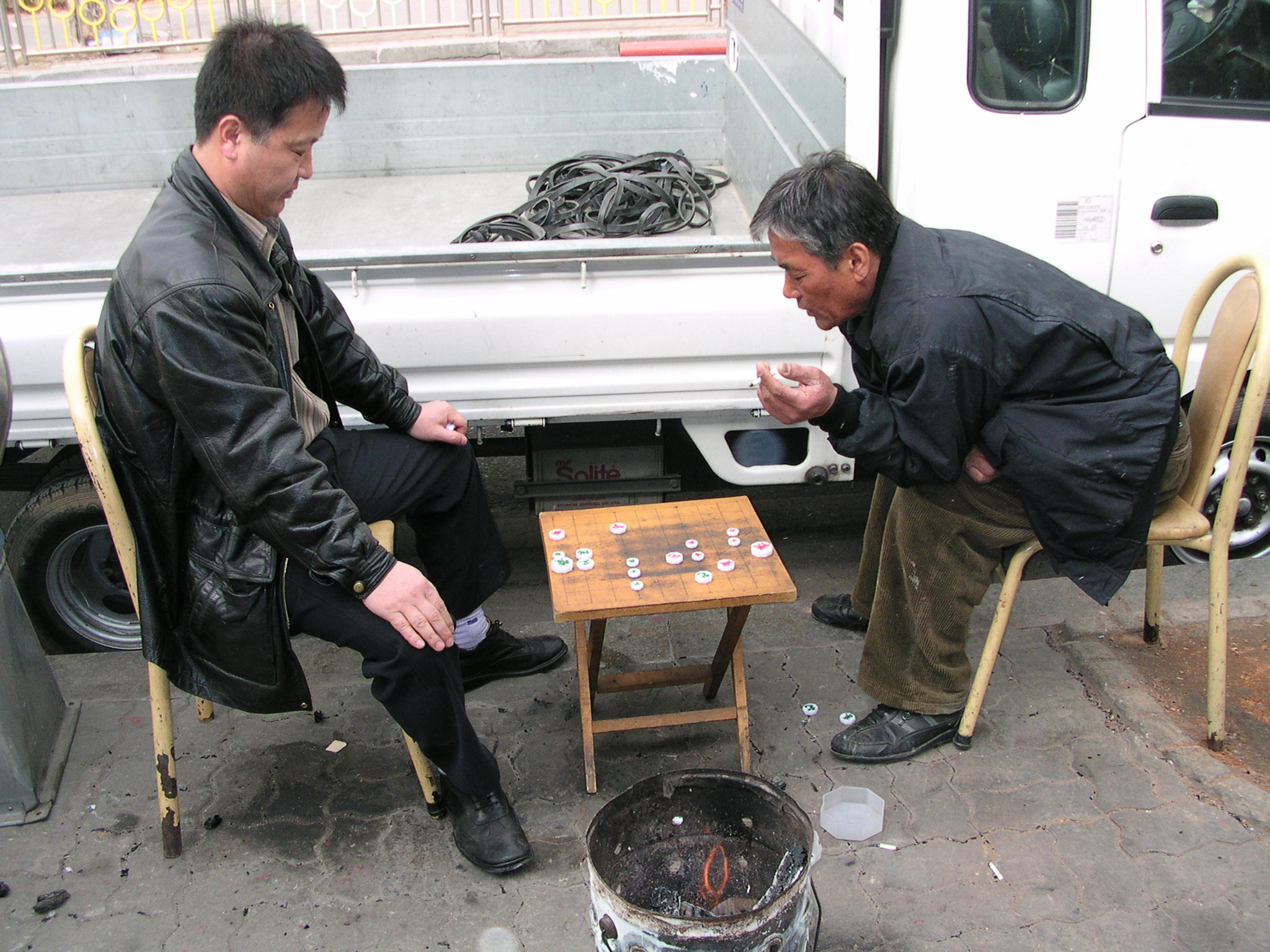
Playing janggi, the only competitively played version of chess with no draws, on Seoul's streets

Kaufman has also mentioned (but not advocated) the system used in janggi (Korean chess): in positions which otherwise would be draws, points are tallied up for the pieces and pawns remaining on the board, with the player moving second being given 1.5 points to compensate for the first-move advantage. Since every piece and pawn is given an integer number of points, the result can never be a draw, making janggi the only competitively played version of chess where draws do not exist (at least when played by the official South Korean tournament rules). He writes: "The chess analogue would perhaps be to count pawn 3, knight 10, bishop 11, rook 16, queen 31 in case of a draw by normal rules, with Black winning ties. It would probably be close to fair, but of course it would be a somewhat different chess."

The magnitude of the first-move advantage differs in other variants. In Fischerandom, as in normal chess, White has a first-move advantage that is probably insufficient to force a win. In shogi, the first move is only a "modest edge" even at top engine level according to Kaufman, whereas in Crazyhouse (which is basically chess with the shogi drop rule), the first player almost certainly has a forced win at engine level. Suicide chess is a weakly solved game: White wins with 1.e3. Kaufman has also mentioned the old Japanese variant chu shogi (played on a 12×12 board with 46 pieces per side) as a case where draws or opening theory should not be a problem.

== White wins ==
Although it is very much a minority view, three prominent twentieth-century masters claimed that White's advantage should or may be decisive with best play.

=== White wins with 1.e4 ===
Position: a8 black rook, b8 black knight, c8 black bishop, d8 black queen, e8 black king, f8 black bishop, g8 black knight, h8 black rook, a7 black pawn, b7 black pawn, c7 black pawn, d7 black pawn, e7 black pawn, f7 black pawn, g7 black pawn, h7 black pawn, e4 white pawn, a2 white pawn, b2 white pawn, c2 white pawn, d2 white pawn, f2 white pawn, g2 white pawn, h2 white pawn, a1 white rook, b1 white knight, c1 white bishop, d1 white queen, e1 white king, f1 white bishop, g1 white knight, h1 white rook

After 1.e4, "White ought to win", according to Adams.

Weaver Adams, then one of the leading American masters, was the best-known proponent of this view, which he introduced in his 1939 book White to Play and Win, and continued to expound in later books and articles until shortly before his death in 1963. Adams opined that 1.e4 was White's strongest move, and that if both sides played the best moves thereafter, "White ought to win." Adams' claim was widely ridiculed, and he did not succeed in demonstrating the validity of his theory in tournament and match practice. The year after his book was published, at the finals of the 1940 U.S. Open tournament, he scored only one draw in his four games as White, but won all four of his games as Black. Adams also lost a match to IM I.A. Horowitz, who took the black pieces in every game. Larry Kaufman wrote in 2020 that Adams "resorted to dubious gambits that were often just winning for Black".

According to Sveshnikov, Vsevolod Rauzer, a leading Soviet player and theoretician during the 1930s, likewise "claimed in the [1930s]: '1.e4—and White wins!' and he managed to prove it quite often".

=== White wins with 1.d4 ===
Position: a8 black rook, b8 black knight, c8 black bishop, d8 black queen, e8 black king, f8 black bishop, g8 black knight, h8 black rook, a7 black pawn, b7 black pawn, c7 black pawn, d7 black pawn, e7 black pawn, f7 black pawn, g7 black pawn, h7 black pawn, d4 white pawn, a2 white pawn, b2 white pawn, c2 white pawn, e2 white pawn, f2 white pawn, g2 white pawn, h2 white pawn, a1 white rook, b1 white knight, c1 white bishop, d1 white queen, e1 white king, f1 white bishop, g1 white knight, h1 white rook

After 1.d4, Berliner claimed that White may have a winning advantage.

More recently, IM Hans Berliner, a former World Champion of Correspondence Chess, claimed in his 1999 book The System that 1.d4 gives White a large, and possibly decisive, advantage. Berliner asserted that with best play White wins against the Grünfeld Defense, the Modern Benoni, the Benko Gambit and other (unnamed) "major defences", and achieves at least a large advantage in many lines of the Queen's Gambit Declined. He allowed, however, that "It is possible that the rules of chess are such that only some number of plausible-appearing defences to 1.d4 can be refuted." Berliner wrote that Adams' "theories, though looked upon with scorn by most top chess players, made an immediate and lasting impression on me. Weaver W. Adams was the first person I met who actually had theories about how chess should be played."

Berliner's thesis, like Adams', has been sharply criticized.

== Modern perspectives ==
As explained below, chess theorists in recent decades have continued to debate the size and nature of White's advantage, if any. Apart from Berliner, they have rejected the idea that White has a forced win from the opening position. Many also reject the traditional paradigm that Black's objective should be to neutralize White's initiative and obtain equality.

=== White has an enduring advantage ===
Starting from 2004, GM Larry Kaufman has expressed a more nuanced view than Adams and Berliner, arguing that the initiative stemming from the first move can always be transformed into some sort of enduring advantage, albeit not a decisive one. This has been the consensus for almost as long as players' views on the first-move advantage in chess have been recorded. He wrote in 2020, "I don't believe that White has a forced win in chess, but I do believe that if he starts with 1.e4 and makes no mistakes, he can retain at least the preferable position without allowing an obvious draw for 30 to 40 moves or so, beyond the point to which openings can generally be analyzed. He should normally get positions where it is fairly easy to explain why White is better, even if in many cases a grandmaster can expect to hold the draw against a similar opponent. Black should at least be the one who has to be careful to get the draw." Nonetheless, Kaufman considers it necessary for White to make no mistakes to achieve this evaluation. Kaufman writes that "once White makes one or two second-rate moves I start to look for a black advantage", which is similar to the view offered by the 1786 Traité des Amateurs.

In 2021, Kaufman wrote that "it appears that White is a long way off from having a forced win in chess", but also that "White is actually quite close to having enough to play for a win without risk at [3000+ Elo] level", and that "with powerful hardware and long time limits" Stockfish NNUE may already be "almost unbeatable", "even against a similar engine". Kaufman has tried to compare White's first-move advantage with various positional or material advantages by having engines play games from modified versions of the opening position: he concludes that "if we define 1.00 as the advantage of a clean extra pawn in the opening with all other factors being equal, it takes above a 0.70 advantage in the opening to be more likely to win than to draw with perfect play (or at least with the most perfect play available now)", and that White's first-move advantage on this scale would be "about 0.20" (assuming he is speaking of a linear scale, an advantage of 0.20 gives White 1 win and 6 draws in 7 games, and 1.50, half a minor piece, is already more than enough to start to look for a conversion). Thus a tempo is worth 0.4 (just under half a pawn), and Kaufman remarks that this means that even allowing White to start with a whole extra move before play (1.e4 2.d4 before Black makes a move) would only result in a 0.6 advantage, not enough to win (engine tests agree). Kaufman further makes the point that if White starts without the c-pawn, engine tests suggest that Black is only barely winning (roughly a 0.75 advantage for Black, because White has compensation from moving first and having an open diagonal for the queen), supporting his contention that "White's initial advantage in chess is way too small to win the game without significant mistakes by Black".

The above conclusions are about optimal play; human play is far from optimal. A pawn down without compensation is usually lost with perfect play, but accumulated small errors mean that grandmasters have a difficult time converting games against engines when they are a clean minor piece up, and have sometimes even lost. In a knight odds for compensation 16-game rapid match (the compensation being either a pawn, castling rights, or Chess960 with the king and rooks on their normal squares; time control 15+10 with the engine always playing White) between GM Alex Lenderman and the engine Komodo in 2020, Lenderman won 9–7 (+5 −3 =8), demonstrating the difficulties involved. Komodo played a six-game match at full knight odds against GM David Smerdon at the same time control the same year; Smerdon won 5–1 (+5 −1 =0). Thus, there is a large difference between the threshold of being objectively lost, and the threshold of resignability (not being able to create practical chances) in human play. As of 2025, strong grandmasters need roughly knight odds to be competitive against engines, and International Masters roughly rook odds.

=== Black is OK! ===
Starting in 1988, Adorján has argued in a series of books and magazine articles that "Black is OK!" Alone amongst modern writers, Adorján claims that White starts the game with essentially no advantage. He writes, "In my opinion, the only obvious advantage for White is that if he or she plays for a draw, and does so well, then Black can hardly avoid this without taking obvious risks." Adorján goes so far as to claim that, "The tale of White's advantage is a delusion; belief in it is based on mass psychosis." Rowson writes that Adorján's "contention is one of the most important chess ideas of the last two decades ... because it has shaken our assumption that White begins the game with some advantage, and revealed its ideological nature". Rowson rejects Adorján's claim, however, that White has essentially no advantage, reasoning that "'White is better' and 'Black is OK' need not be mutually exclusive claims". Kaufman writes that he has to disagree with Adorján's claim that "with the right choice of defenses Black should have roughly equal chances", but that Adorján is "correct in the sense that Black need not lose just because he moves second".

GM Lajos Portisch opined in 1994, and was quoted in one of Adorján's books, that "at least two-thirds of all 'tested' openings give White an apparent advantage." In 2021, Kaufman noted that the number of openings considered playable at the top level has shrunk further, because engines have shown that space advantages are worth more than had been previously supposed: consequently, he writes that "many defenses formerly considered to be playable, if slightly worse for Black, are now viewed as practically, if not theoretically, losing to a well prepared opponent", listing the King's Indian Defense as an example. According to Portisch, for Black, "The root of the problem is that very few people know which are the openings where Black is really OK. Those who find these lines have nothing to fear, as Black is indeed OK, but only in those variations!" Rowson considers this an important point, noting that "1.d4 players struggle to get anywhere against main-line Slavs and 1.e4 players find the Najdorf and Sveshnikov Sicilians particularly tough." Kaufman likewise writes that "White gets a real advantage against all Sicilians other than the Najdorf and Sveshnikov", and that the Berlin and Marshall defenses to the Ruy Lopez are "very close to equal"; indeed, he had to write a new edition of his opening repertoire book (switching from 1.d4 to 1.e4) because "it became nearly impossible to show a consistent advantage for White [after 1.d4], especially against the Grünfeld and Nimzo/Ragozin defenses".

Views on the best openings for Black have played a role in determining what opening moves are more fashionable for White. Kaufman wrote in 2004 that White's "only serious [tries] for advantage in the opening" are 1.e4 and the Queen's Gambit (by which he means playing d4 and c4 in the first few moves, thus also including diverse Black responses like the King's Indian, the Nimzo-Indian, the Modern Benoni, and the Grünfeld). In the 19th century, general opinion was that 1.e4 was obviously the best move and 1...e5 obviously the best reply; but in the first half of the 20th century, the French Defence (1.e4 e6) became popular, and Kaufman speculates that this led to 1.d4 surpassing 1.e4 in popularity among masters then. By the second half of the 20th century, the French had fallen out of favour, and the Najdorf was generally considered Black's best response to and perhaps the only way to equalise against 1.e4. Statistics in 2000 thus show 1.e4 as scoring worse than 1.d4, because of the Sicilian; Kaufman suggests that this may be a reason why Kasparov favoured 1.d4 for most of his career. However, analytical advances have since shown that there are many dangerous ways that White can play for an advantage against the Najdorf, that Black must be very well-prepared to survive, and that White can avoid the Najdorf and Sveshnikov altogether by playing 3.Bb5 and still have the better chances. Meanwhile, the Ruy Lopez, which previously was seen to give White an advantage, is now seen as very even because of the Berlin and Marshall – so much so that the Italian Game, which Kaufman writes "was considered to be a harmless sideline last century", is now seen as a "serious alternative" to the Ruy Lopez. As such, elite players currently prefer 1.e4 e5 to 1.e4 c5.

=== Dynamism ===
Modern writers often think of Black's role in more dynamic terms than merely trying to equalize. Rowson writes that "the idea of Black trying to 'equalize' is questionable. I think it has limited application to a few openings, rather than being an opening prescription for Black in general." Evans wrote that after one of his games against Fischer, "Fischer confided his 'secret' to me: unlike other masters, he sought to win with the Black pieces from the start. The revelation that Black has dynamic chances and need not be satisfied with mere equality was the turning point in his career, he said." Likewise, Watson surmised that Kasparov, when playing Black, bypasses the question of whether White has an opening advantage "by thinking in terms of the concrete nature of the dynamic imbalance on the board, and seeking to seize the initiative whenever possible". Watson observes that "energetic opening play by Black may ... lead to a position so complex and unclear that to speak of equality is meaningless. Sometimes we say 'dynamically balanced' instead of 'equal' to express the view that either player is as likely as the other to emerge from complications with an advantage. This style of opening play has become prevalent in modern chess, with World Champions Fischer and Kasparov as its most visible practitioners."

Modern writers also question the idea that White has an enduring advantage. Șubă, in his influential 1991 book Dynamic Chess Strategy, rejects the notion that the initiative can always be transformed into an enduring advantage. He contends that sometimes the player with the initiative loses it with no logical explanation, and that, "Sometimes you must lose it, just like that. If you try to cling to it, by forcing the issue, your dynamic potential will become exhausted and you won't be able to face a vigorous counter-attack." Rowson and Watson concur. Watson also observes, "Because of the presumption of White being better, the juncture of the game at which Black frees his game or neutralizes White's plans has often been automatically assumed to give him equality, even though in dynamic openings, the exhaustion of White's initiative very often means that Black has seized it with advantage."

=== Countervailing advantages ===
Rowson argues that both White and Black have certain advantages:

==== White's advantages ====
Position: a8 black rook, d8 black queen, f8 black rook, g8 black king, b7 black bishop, c7 black pawn, e7 black bishop, f7 black pawn, g7 black pawn, h7 black pawn, a6 black pawn, c6 black knight, d6 black pawn, f6 black knight, b5 black pawn, e5 black pawn, d4 white pawn, e4 white pawn, b3 white bishop, c3 white pawn, f3 white knight, h3 white pawn, a2 white pawn, b2 white pawn, f2 white pawn, g2 white pawn, a1 white rook, b1 white knight, c1 white bishop, d1 white queen, e1 white rook, g1 white king

Position after 12.Nf3: Black must either continue with the Zaitsev Variation (12...Re8), allowing White an immediate draw, or choose a different variation.

According to Rowson, White's first advantage is that "the first move has some similarities with the first serve in tennis in that White can score an 'ace' (for instance with a powerful opening novelty), he has more control over the pace and direction of the game, and he has a 'second serve' in that when things go wrong his position is not usually losing." Second, White begins the game with some initiative, although Rowson regards this as a psychological rather than a positional advantage, "and whether it leads to a positional advantage depends on the relative skill of the players." Third, some players are able to use the initiative to "play a kind of powerful 'serve and volley' chess in which Black is flattened with a mixture of deep preparation and attacking prowess." Fourth, "If White wants to draw, it is often not so easy for Black to prevent this. This advantage is particularly acute in cases where there is a possible threefold repetition, because White can begin the repetition without committing to a draw and Black has to decide whether to deviate before he knows whether White is bluffing."

Rowson cites as an example of the last phenomenon the well-regarded Zaitsev Variation of the Ruy Lopez. After 1.e4 e5 2.Nf3 Nc6 3.Bb5 a6 4.Ba4 Nf6 5.0-0 Be7 6.Re1 b5 7.Bb3 0-0 8.c3 d6 9.h3 Bb7 10.d4 Re8 (initiating the Zaitsev Variation), White can repeat moves once with 11.Ng5 Rf8 12.Nf3. This gives Black an awkward choice between (a) insisting on the Zaitsev with 12...Re8, which allows White to choose whether to draw by threefold repetition with 13.Ng5 Rf8 14.Nf3, or play on with a different move, or (b) playing something other than 12...Re8 and entering an inferior variation. Kaufman mentions this draw, as well as an early one in the Italian Game (1.e4 e5 2.Nf3 Nc6 3.Bc4 Bc5 4.c3 Nf6 5.d4 exd4 6.cxd4 Bb4+ 7.Bd2 Bxd2+ 8.Nbxd2 d5 9.exd5 Nxd5 10.Qb3 Na5 11.Qa4+ Nc6 12.Qb3), in the context of arguing for his proposed rule change to penalise threefold repetition: he argues that "the majority of repetitions occur when the game isn't otherwise clearly drawn".

==== Black's advantages ====
Rowson argues that Black also has several advantages. First, "White's alleged advantage is also a kind of obligation to play for a win, and Black can often use this to his advantage." Second, "White's 'extra move' can be a burden, and sometimes White finds himself in a mild form of zugzwang ('Zugzwang Lite')." Third, although White begins the game with the initiative, if "Black retains a flexible position with good reactive possibilities, this initiative can be absorbed and often passes over to Black." Fourth, "The fact that White moves before Black often gives Black useful information". Șubă likewise argues that White's advantage is actually less than a move, since White must tip his hand first, allowing Black to react to White's plans. Șubă writes, "In terms of the mathematical games theory, chess is a game of complete information, and Black's information is always greater—by one move!"

Rowson also notes that Black's chances increase markedly by playing good openings, which tend to be those with flexibility and latent potential, "rather than those that give White fixed targets or that try to take the initiative prematurely." He also emphasizes that "White has 'the initiative', not 'the advantage'. Success with Black depends on seeing beyond the initiative and thinking of positions in terms of 'potential'." These ideas are exemplified by the Hedgehog, a dynamic modern system against the English Opening that can arise from various move orders. A typical position arises after 1.c4 c5 2.Nf3 Nf6 3.g3 b6 4.Bg2 Bb7 5.0-0 e6 6.Nc3 Be7 7.d4 cxd4 8.Qxd4 d6 9.e4 a6. White has a spatial advantage, while Black often maneuvers his pieces on the last two ranks of the board, but White "has to keep a constant eye on the possible liberating pawn thrusts ...b5 and ...d5." Watson remarks, "Black's goal is to remain elastic and flexible, with many options for his pieces, whereas White can become paralyzed at some point by the need to protect against various dynamic pawn breaks." He also observes that, "White tends to be as much tied up by Black's latent activity as Black himself is tied up by White's space advantage." Moreover, attempts by White to overrun Black's position often rebound disastrously. An example of this is the following grandmaster game:

Polugaevsky vs. Ftáčnik, 1982

Position: c8 black rook, d8 black rook, g8 black king, b7 black bishop, c7 black queen, e7 black bishop, f7 black pawn, g7 black pawn, a6 black pawn, b6 black pawn, d6 black pawn, e6 black pawn, f6 black knight, g6 black knight, h5 black pawn, a4 white pawn, c4 white pawn, e4 white pawn, f4 white pawn, b3 white pawn, c3 white knight, f3 white knight, g3 white pawn, h3 white pawn, b2 white bishop, e2 white queen, g2 white bishop, a1 white rook, d1 white rook, g1 white king

Position after 19.Nf3

Position: c8 black rook, g8 black king, b7 black bishop, g7 black pawn, a6 black pawn, b6 black pawn, e6 black pawn, c5 black bishop, d5 black rook, e5 white pawn, h5 white queen, a4 white pawn, h4 white pawn, b3 white pawn, g3 black queen, h3 white pawn, b2 white bishop, g2 white bishop, a1 white rook, f1 white rook, h1 white king

Position after 28.Rf1

Lev Polugaevsky vs. Ľubomír Ftáčnik, Lucerne Olympiad 1982
1. Nf3 Nf6 2. c4 c5 3. Nc3 e6 4. g3 b6 5. Bg2 Bb7 6. 0-0 Be7 7. d4 cxd4 8. Qxd4 d6 9. Rd1 a6 10. b3 Nbd7 11. e4 Qb8 12. Bb2 0-0 Șubă wrote of a similar Hedgehog position, "White's position looks ideal. That's the naked truth about it, but the 'ideal' has by definition one drawback—it cannot be improved." 13. Nd2 Rd8 14. a4 Qc7 15. Qe3 Rac8 16. Qe2 Ne5 17. h3? According to Ftáčnik, 17.f4 Neg4 18.Rf1 is better. h5! 18. f4 Ng6 19. Nf3 Now Black breaks open the position in typical Hedgehog fashion. d5! 20. cxd5?! Ftáčnik considers 20.e5 or 20.exd5 preferable. h4! 21. Nxh4 Nxh4 22. gxh4 Qxf4 23. dxe6 fxe6 24. e5? Ftáčnik recommends instead 24.Rxd8 Rxd8 25.Rd1. Bc5+ 25. Kh1 Nh5! 26. Qxh5 Qg3 27. Nd5 Other moves get mated immediately: 27.Bxb7 Qh3#; 27.Qe2 Qxh3#; 27.Qg4 Bxg2#. Rxd5 28. Rf1 Qxg2+! 29. Kxg2 Rd2+ 0–1 White resigned. After 30.Kg3 (the only legal response to the double check), 30...Rg2+ 31.Kf4 Rf8+ forces mate.

An examination of reversed and symmetrical openings illustrates White's and Black's respective advantages:

===== Reversed openings =====
In a "reversed opening", White plays an opening typically played by Black, but with colors reversed and thus an extra tempo. Evans writes of such openings, "If a defense is considered good for Black, it must be even better for White with a move in hand." Former World Champion Mikhail Botvinnik reportedly expressed the same view regarding 1.c4 e5 (a reversed Sicilian), as has Kaufman. Watson questions this idea, citing Șubă's thesis that Black, by moving second, has more complete information than White. He writes, "everyone has such difficulties playing as White against a Sicilian Defence (1.e4 c5), but ... leading masters have no qualms about answering 1.c4 with 1...e5." To explain this paradox, Watson discusses several different reversed Sicilian lines, showing how Black can exploit the disadvantages of various "extra" moves for White. He concludes,

The point is, Black's set-up in the Sicilian is fine as a reactive system, but not worth much when trying to claim the initiative as White. This is true because Black is able to react to the specific plan White chooses; in Șubă's terms, his information is indeed a move greater! Furthermore, he is able to take advantage of dead equal positions which White (hoping to retain the advantage of the first move) would normally avoid.

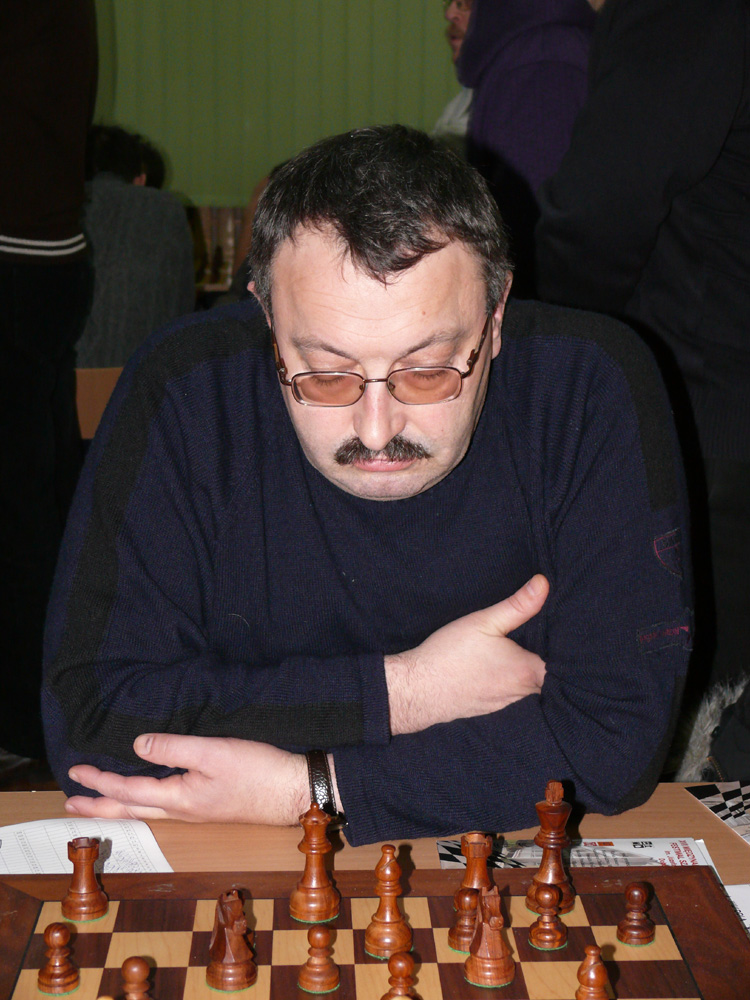
"That extra move's gonna hurt me." — Vladimir Malaniuk

Watson also observes, "Similarly, the Dutch Defence looks particularly sterile when White achieves the reversed positions a tempo up (it turns out that he has nothing useful to do!); and indeed, many standard Black openings are not very inspiring when one gets them as White, tempo in hand." GM Alex Yermolinsky likewise notes that GM Vladimir Malaniuk, a successful exponent of the Leningrad Dutch (1.d4 f5 2.g3 g6) at the highest levels, "once made a deep impression on me by casually dismissing someone's suggestion that he should try 1.f4 (Bird's Opening) as White. He smiled and said, 'That extra move's gonna hurt me.'" Indeed, Kaufman's preferred response to the Bird hinges on this point: against a Leningrad Dutch white would play c2–c4 early, but with colours reversed, White's extra move after 1.f4 Nf6 2.Nf3 d5 3.g3 means that Black can exploit the unmoved c-pawn and play the strong 3...c6.

Yermolinsky also agrees with Alekhine's criticism of 1.g3 e5 2.Nf3, a reversed Alekhine's Defense, in Réti–Alekhine, Baden-Baden 1925, writing that Alekhine "understood the difference in opening philosophies for White and Black, and realized they just can't be the same! White is supposed to try for more than just obtaining a comfortable game in reversed colour opening set-ups, and, as the statistics show—surprisingly for a lot of people, but not for me—White doesn't even score as well as Black does in the same positions with his extra tempo and all." Howard Staunton, generally considered to have been the strongest player in the world from 1843 to 1851, made a similar point over 160 years ago, writing that Owen's Defense (1.e4 b6) is playable for Black, but that 1.b3 is inferior to "the more customary [first] moves, from its being essentially defensive". The current view is that Owen's Defense is slightly better for White, while 1.b3 is playable but less likely to yield an opening advantage than 1.e4 or 1.d4.

Stefan Djuric, Dimitri Komarov, and Claudio Pantaleoni make a similar point regarding Anderssen's Opening (1.a3): "[...a6 for Black] is a useful pawn move, and it is often a fundamental component in many Black defences. ... It therefore comes as little surprise that some bright spark had the idea of playing these set-ups with an extra tempo. However, it is essential to remember that ...a6 is fundamentally a reactive move that prepares counterplay on the queenside in openings where White has already taken possession of the centre. The problem here is that it is impossible to have counterplay if the other side is not attacking you." They go on to recommend (as they do for the Clemenz Opening, 1.h3) that Black, faced with such a first move, can aim for a set-up where White's rook-pawn advance is not useful or even a liability.

Watson concludes that

1. "most moves have disadvantages as well as advantages, so an extra move is not always an unqualified blessing";
2. "with his extra information about what White is doing, Black can better react to the new situation"; and
3. because a draw is likely to be more acceptable to Black than to White, White is apt to avoid lines that allow drawish simplifications, while Black may not object to such lines.

===== Symmetrical openings =====
Rowson writes that "in general one would assume that whatever advantage White has would be revealed most clearly in symmetrical positions." Accordingly, Watson, Șubă, Evans, and the eminent player and theorist Aron Nimzowitsch (1886–1935) have all argued that it is in Black's interest to avoid symmetry.

General arguments, on the other hand, do not always stand up to concrete analysis. In the 1960s, Bobby Fischer considered the Sicilian (1.e4 c5) to be better than the Open Game (1.e4 e5), because of its asymmetry. He argued that after 1.e4 e5 2.Nf3 Nc6, White is better because he has the move and the attacking rather than defending knight, and is closer to being able to castle; whereas after 1...c5, White cannot play d4 without conceding one of his centre pawns. However, concrete analysis since then has led to the current world elite favouring the Open Game over the Sicilian.

Even symmetrical opening lines sometimes illustrate the tenuous nature of White's advantage, in several respects. It is often difficult for White to prove an advantage in symmetrical opening lines. As GM Bent Larsen wrote, annotating a game that began 1.c4 c5 2.b3 b6, "In symmetrical openings, White has a theoretical advantage, but in many of them it is only theoretical." GM Andrew Soltis wrote in 2008 that he hates playing against the symmetrical Petroff's Defense (1.e4 e5 2.Nf3 Nf6), and accordingly varies with 2.Nc3, the Vienna Game. However, there too he has been unable to find a way to an advantage after the symmetrical 2...Nc6 3.g3 g6 4.Bg2 Bg7, or after 3.Nf3 Nf6 (transposing to the Four Knights Game) 4.Bb5 Bb4 5.0-0 0-0 6.d3 d6 7.Bg5 Bg4 8.Nd5 Nd4 9.Nxb4 Nxb5, or 7.Ne2 Ne7 8.c3 Ba5 9.Ng3 c6 10.Ba4 Ng6 11.d4 d5, when 12.exd5?! e4! may even favor Black.

Moreover, symmetrical positions may be disadvantageous to White in that he has to commit himself first. Watson notes that it is even difficult for White to play noncommittally in a symmetrical position, since almost every move has certain drawbacks. Fischer once went so far as to claim that after 1.Nf3 Nf6 2.g3 g6 3.Bg2 Bg7 4.0-0 0-0 5.d3 d6 (Reinhard–Fischer, Western Open 1963), "'Believe it or not,' Black stands better! Now, whatever White does, Black will vary it and get an asymmetrical position and have the superior position due to his better pawn structure!" However, GM Paul Keres responded in CHESS magazine, "We just don't believe it!" In symmetrical positions, as the Hodgson–Arkell and Portisch–Tal games discussed below illustrate, Black can continue to imitate White as long as he finds it feasible and desirable to do so, and deviate when that ceases to be the case.

Further, a particular extra move is sometimes more of a liability than an asset. For example, Soltis notes that the Exchange French position arising after 1.e4 e6 2.d4 d5 3.exd5 exd5 4.Nf3 Nf6 "is pretty equal". The same position, but with Black's knight moved to e4, arises in Petroff's Defense after 1.e4 e5 2.Nf3 Nf6 3.Nxe5 d6 4.Nf3 Nxe4 5.d4 d5. That position offers White better chances precisely because Black's extra move (...Ne4) allows the advanced knight to become a target for attack.

On a guest appearance of the Lex Fridman Podcast in October 2022, grandmaster and current number-two classical chess player Hikaru Nakamura believes that Black can maintain sufficient symmetry to force a draw with perfect play.

Finally, symmetrical positions may be difficult for the white player for psychological reasons. Watson writes that anyone who tries the Exchange French, "even if he thinks he is playing for a win, assume[s] a psychological burden. White has already ceded the advantage of the first move, and knows it, whereas Black is challenged to find ways to seize the initiative." Two famous examples of White losses in the Exchange French are M. Gurevich–Short and Tatai–Korchnoi. In M. Gurevich–Short, a game between two of the world's leading players, White needed only a draw to qualify for the Candidates Matches, while Black needed to win. Gurevich played passively and was outplayed by Short, who achieved the necessary win. (Note: The win qualified Short for the Candidates, and he ultimately went on to challenge Kasparov for the World Championship.) In Tatai–Korchnoi, the Italian IM fell victim to Korchnoi's whirlwind mating attack, losing in just 14 moves.

Rowson gives the following example of Black outplaying White from the Symmetrical Variation of the English Opening. He remarks, "there is something compelling about Black's strategy. He seems to be saying: 'I will copy all your good moves, and as soon as you make a bad move, I won't copy you any more!'"

Hodgson vs. Arkell, 2001

Position: b8 black rook, c8 black bishop, d8 black queen, e8 black king, g8 black knight, h8 black rook, d7 black pawn, e7 black pawn, f7 black pawn, g7 black bishop, h7 black pawn, c6 black knight, g6 black pawn, b5 black pawn, b4 white pawn, c3 white knight, g3 white pawn, d2 white pawn, e2 white pawn, f2 white pawn, g2 white bishop, h2 white pawn, b1 white rook, c1 white bishop, d1 white queen, e1 white king, g1 white knight, h1 white rook

Position after 9...axb5

Position: c8 black rook, d8 black queen, e8 black rook, g8 black king, f7 black pawn, g6 black pawn, b5 white pawn, e5 black pawn, f5 black bishop, h5 black pawn, d4 black pawn, e4 black knight, b3 white rook, g3 white pawn, h3 white pawn, b2 white bishop, e2 white pawn, f2 white pawn, g2 white bishop, h2 white king, d1 white queen, f1 white rook

Position after 24...d4

Hodgson vs. Arkell, Newcastle 2001
1. c4 c5 2. g3 g6 3. Bg2 Bg7 4. Nc3 Nc6 5. a3 a6 6. Rb1 Rb8 7. b4 cxb4 8. axb4 b5 9. cxb5 axb5 (first diagram). Here Rowson remarks, "Both sides want to push their d-pawn and play Bf4/...Bf5, but White has to go first so Black gets to play ...d5 before White can play d4. This doesn't matter much, but it already points to the challenge that White faces here; his most natural continuations allow Black to play the moves he wants to. I would therefore say that White is in 'Zugzwang Lite' and that he remains in this state for several moves." 10. Nf3 d5 10...Nf6 11.0-0 0-0 12.d3 d6 13.Bd2 Bd7 would transpose to the Portisch–Tal game below. 11. d4 Nf6 12. Bf4 Rb6 13. 0-0 Bf5 14. Rb3 0-0 15. Ne5 Ne4 16. h3 h5!? Finally breaking the symmetry. 17. Kh2 The position is still almost symmetrical, and White can find nothing useful to do with his extra move. Rowson whimsically suggests 17.h4!?, forcing Black to be the one to break the symmetry. 17... Re8! Rowson notes that this is a useful waiting move, covering e7, which needs protection in some lines, and possibly supporting an eventual ...e5 (see Black's twenty-second move). White cannot copy it, since after 18.Re1? Nxf2 Black would win a pawn. 18. Be3?! Nxe5! 19. dxe5 Rc6! Rowson notes that with his more active pieces, "It looks like Black has some initiative." If now 20.Nxd5, Bxe5 "is at least equal for Black". 20. Nxb5 Bxe5! 20...Nxf2? 21.Qxd5! wins. 21. Nd4 Bxd4 22. Bxd4 e5 Rowson writes, "Now both sides have their trumps, but I think Black has some advantage, due to his extra central control, imposing knight and prospects for a kingside attack." 23. b5 Rc8 24. Bb2 d4 (second diagram). Now White has a difficult game: Rowson analyzes 25.e3?! Nxg3 24.fxg3 Bc2 25.Qf3 Bxb3 26.exd4 Bc4!, winning; 25.g4 hxg4 26.hxg4 Nxf2! 27.Rxf2 Bc2, winning; 25.Qe1!? Rc2! with advantage; and 25.f4 (risky-looking, but perhaps best) Nc3! 26.Bxc3 dxc3 27.Qxd8 Rexd8, and Black is better. 25. b6? Overlooking Black's threat. 25... Nxf2! 26. Qe1 If 26.Rxf2, Bc2 forks White's queen and rook. 26... Ne4 27. b7 Rb8 28. g4 hxg4 29. hxg4 Be6 30. Rb5 Nf6! 31. Rxf6 Qxf6 32. Qg3 Bc4 33. g5 Qh8+ 0–1

The opening of the following game between two world-class players, another Symmetrical English, took a similar course:

Portisch vs. Tal, 1965

Position: b8 black rook, d8 black queen, f8 black rook, g8 black king, d7 black bishop, e7 black pawn, f7 black pawn, g7 black bishop, h7 black pawn, c6 black knight, d6 black pawn, f6 black knight, g6 black pawn, b5 black pawn, b4 white pawn, c3 white knight, d3 white pawn, f3 white knight, g3 white pawn, d2 white bishop, e2 white pawn, f2 white pawn, g2 white bishop, h2 white pawn, b1 white rook, d1 white queen, f1 white rook, g1 white king

Position after 13...Bd7; White to play, but Black has the easier game

Position: c8 black rook, g8 black king, c7 black queen, d7 black bishop, e7 black pawn, f7 black pawn, h7 black pawn, d6 black pawn, f6 black knight, g6 black pawn, b5 black pawn, b4 white pawn, d4 white knight, c3 black rook, d3 white pawn, g3 white pawn, d2 white queen, e2 white pawn, f2 white pawn, g2 white bishop, h2 white pawn, b1 white rook, c1 white rook, g1 white king

Position after 19...Rc8

Lajos Portisch vs. Mikhail Tal, Candidates Match 1965
1. Nf3 c5 2. c4 Nc6 3. Nc3 Nf6 4. g3 g6 5. Bg2 Bg7 6. 0-0 0-0 7. d3 a6 8. a3 Rb8 9. Rb1 b5 10. cxb5 axb5 11. b4 cxb4 12. axb4 d6 13. Bd2 Bd7 (see first diagram). Once again, White is on move in a symmetrical position, but it is not obvious what he can do with his first-move initiative. Soltis writes, "It's ridiculous to think Black's position is better. But Mikhail Tal said it is easier to play. By moving second he gets to see White's move and then decide whether to match it." 14. Qc1 Here, Soltis writes that Black could maintain equality by keeping the symmetry: 14...Qc8 15.Bh6 Bh3. Instead, he plays to prove that White's queen is misplaced. 14... Rc8! 15. Bh6 Nd4! Threatening 16...Nxe2+. 16. Nxd4 Bxh6 17. Qxh6 Rxc3 18. Qd2 Qc7 19. Rfc1 Rc8 (second diagram). Although the pawn structure is still symmetrical, Black's control of the c-file gives him the advantage. Black ultimately reached an endgame two pawns up, but White managed to hold a draw in 83 moves.

Tal himself lost a famous game as White from a symmetrical position in Tal–Beliavsky, USSR Championship 1974.

== Tournament and match play ==
In chess tournaments and matches, the frequency with which each player receives white and black is an important consideration. In matches, the players' colors in the first game are determined by drawing lots, and alternated thereafter. In round robin tournaments with an odd number of players, each player receives an equal number of whites and blacks; with an even number of players, each receives one extra white or black. Where one or more players withdraws from the tournament, the tournament director may change the assigned colors in some games so that no player receives two more blacks than whites, or vice versa. The double-round robin tournament is considered to give the most reliable final standings, since each player receives the same number of whites and blacks, and plays both White and Black against each opponent.

In Swiss system tournaments, the tournament director tries to ensure that each player receives, as nearly as possible, the same number of games as White and Black, and that the player's color alternates from round to round. After the first round, the director may deviate from the otherwise prescribed pairings in order to give as many players as possible their equalizing or due colors. More substantial deviations are permissible to avoid giving a player two more blacks than whites (for example, three blacks in four games) than vice versa, since extra whites "cause far less player distress" than extra blacks, which impose "a significant handicap" on the affected player. Tournaments with an even number of rounds cause the most problems, since if there is a disparity, it is greater (e.g., a player receiving two whites and four blacks).

Armageddon chess is a variant of blitz chess that has often been used as a tiebreaker in recent years, such as in the Chess World Cup and in the Norway Chess tournament (where it was used for individual draws). In Armageddon chess, drawn games are counted as wins for Black (i.e. Black has draw odds), so that a decisive result is guaranteed. Since White's first-move advantage is nowhere near enough to counter that, White is compensated with extra time, usually 5 minutes to 4 minutes when there is no increment. (If there is no increment, then difficult questions arise when players must try to flag in trivial draws, which happened in the Women's World Chess Championship 2008 in the match between Monika Soćko and Sabina-Francesca Foisor. With a small increment, the time odds need to be larger to keep the situation balanced: Norway Chess has used 10 minutes to 7 minutes.)

Armageddon chess does not scale well to slower time controls, as even in rapid the necessary time odds would be too large; in correspondence events or engine vs. engine events, it is simply unworkable. Larry Kaufman, Kai Laskos, and Stephen Pohl have tested using engines (Stockfish, Komodo, and Houdini) an alternative solution, allowing for equal times: Black has draw odds, but is not allowed to castle short. Engine tests suggest that this is fair, which is suggestive as to the size of White's initial advantage, although it has yet to be tried in practice by human grandmasters.

== Solving chess ==
The game of chess is not solved, meaning it has not been determined with certainty whether a perfectly played game would end in a win for White, a draw, or even a win for Black. Due to its high level of complexity and the limitations of computer technology it is considered unlikely that it will be solved in the foreseeable future.

In his 1950 paper "Programming a Computer for Playing Chess", information theorist Claude Shannon argued that in principle the game of chess ought to be solvable. In practical terms, however, he argued that it is not feasible for any computer to actually do this. He estimated that a computer would need to calculate 10^{120} positions from the initial position, which he said would take 10^{90} years. It is thus theoretically possible to solve chess; however, according to Shannon, the time frame required puts this possibility beyond the limits of any feasible technology.

Hans-Joachim Bremermann, a professor of mathematics and biophysics at the University of California at Berkeley, further argued in a 1965 paper that the "speed, memory, and processing capacity of any possible future computer equipment are limited by certain physical barriers: the light barrier, the quantum barrier, and the thermodynamical barrier. These limitations imply, for example, that no computer, however constructed, will ever be able to examine the entire tree of possible move sequences of the game of chess." Nonetheless, Bremermann did not foreclose the possibility that a computer would someday be able to solve chess. He wrote, "In order to have a computer play a perfect or nearly perfect game [of chess] it will be necessary either to analyze the game completely ... or to analyze the game in an approximate way and combine this with a limited amount of tree searching. ... A theoretical understanding of such heuristic programming, however, is still very much wanting."

Recent advances in computer science have not significantly changed that assessment. The game of checkers was solved in 2007, but it has fewer possible positions than chess by several orders of magnitude. Jonathan Schaeffer, the scientist who led the effort, said a breakthrough such as quantum computing would be needed before solving chess could even be attempted, but he does not rule out the possibility, saying that the one thing he learned from his 16-year effort of solving checkers "is to never underestimate the advances in technology".

== Quotations ==
- "You will win with either color if you are the better player, but it takes longer with Black." — Isaac Kashdan
- "When I am White I win because I am White. When I am Black I win because I am Bogoljubow." — Efim Bogoljubow
- "To play for a draw, at any rate with White, is to some degree a crime against chess." — Mikhail Tal

== Sources ==
- Aagaard, Jacob (2004). Excelling at Technical Chess. Gloucester Publishers. ISBN 1-85744-364-0.
- Adams, Weaver W. (1939). White to Play and Win. David McKay. ISBN 978-0-923891-83-1. (2007 Ishi Press edition).
- Adorján, András (1988). Black is OK!. Batsford. ISBN 0-7134-5790-2.
- Adorján, András (1998). Black is O.K. in Rare Openings. CAISSA Ltd.
- Adorján, András (2004). Black is Still OK!. Batsford. ISBN 978-0-7134-8870-8.
- Adorján, András (2005). Black is OK Forever!. Batsford. ISBN 978-0-7134-8942-2.
- Berliner, Hans (1999). The System: A World Champion's Approach to Chess. Gambit Publications. ISBN 1-901983-10-2.
- Bologan, Victor (2014). Bologan's Black Weapons in the Open Games: How to Play for a Win if White Avoids the Ruy Lopez. New in Chess. ISBN 978-90-5691-543-8.
- Chernev, Irving (1955). 1000 Best Short Games of Chess. Fireside; Rei Sub edition. ISBN 978-0-671-53801-9.
- de Firmian, Nick (2008). Modern Chess Openings (15th ed.). McKay Chess Library. ISBN 978-0-8129-3682-7.
- Donaldson, John and Tangborn, Eric (1999). The Unknown Bobby Fischer. International Chess Enterprises. ISBN 978-1-879479-85-2.
- Evans, Larry (1970). Chess Catechism. Simon & Schuster. ISBN 978-0-671-21531-6.
- Georgiev, Kiril and Kolev, Atanas (2007). The Sharpest Sicilian. Simolini 94. ISBN 978-954-8782-56-2.
- Goichberg, Bill, Jarecki, Carol, and Riddle, Ira Lee (1993). U.S. Chess Federation's Official Rules of Chess (4th ed.). David McKay. ISBN 0-8129-2217-4.
- Hooper, David and Whyld, Kenneth (1992). The Oxford Companion to Chess (2nd ed.). Oxford University Press. ISBN 0-19-866164-9.
- Kaufman, Larry (2004). The Chess Advantage in Black and White. David McKay. ISBN 0-8129-3571-3.
- Kaufman, Larry (2020). Kaufman's New Repertoire for Black and White. New in Chess. ISBN 978-9-056-91862-0.
- Kaufman, Larry (2021). Chess Board Options. New in Chess. ISBN 978-9-056-91933-7.
- Kažić, Božidar M. (1980). The Chess Competitor's Handbook. Arco. ISBN 0-668-04963-4.
- Lasker, Emanuel (1960). Lasker's Manual of Chess. Dover Publications. ISBN 978-0-486-20640-0.
- Rowson, Jonathan (2005). Chess for Zebras: Thinking Differently About Black and White. Gambit Publications. ISBN 1-901983-85-4.
- Saidy, Anthony (1975). The Battle of Chess Ideas. RHM Press. ISBN 0-89058-018-9.
- Stevens, Arthur M. (1969). The Blue Book of Charts to Winning Chess. A. S. Barnes and Co.
- Suba, Mihai (1991). Dynamic Chess Strategy. Pergamon Chess. ISBN 0-08-037141-8.
- Watson, John (1986). Play the French. Pergamon Press. ISBN 0-08-026929-X.
- Watson, John (1998). Secrets of Modern Chess Strategy: Advances since Nimzowitsch. Gambit Publications. ISBN 1-901983-07-2.
- Watson, John (2006). Mastering the Chess Openings, Volume 1. Gambit Publications. ISBN 978-1-904600-60-2.
