= Serafino Dubois =

Italian chess player (1817–1899)

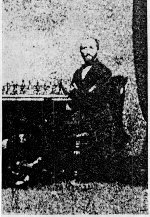
Serafino Dubois

Serafino Dubois (10 October 1817 – 15 January 1899) was an Italian chess Master and chess writer. Dubois was certainly among the strongest players in the world during the 1850s. He was known for his writings on the game and for his promotion of chess in Italy.

== Chess career ==
Serafino Dubois was born in Rome. His early career coincided with a time when the Italian rules of chess differed from those elsewhere in Europe, but he wasn't content with being recognized as the best player in Italy; he needed to prove himself on the European board as well.

During the early to middle part of the nineteenth century, chess tournaments were few and far between, and many of the top players were limited to playing matches against each other, usually for a substantial purse, which was either staked by themselves or by their patrons. From the 1840s to the 1860s, Dubois took part in many matches against the top players of Europe, and it was rare for him to lose, even when he gave odds of pawn and move to his opponents.

In 1846 he played a number of games in Rome against the strong English Master Marmaduke Wyvill, and it has been reported that Dubois won 55–26 when no odds were given by either side, but lost 39–30 when he gave odds of pawn and move to his opponent.

In 1855 he visited Paris and the famous Café de la Régence, a mecca for the leading French players and enthusiasts from abroad. He played no fewer than four matches, beating the strong French player Jules Arnous de Rivière by 25–7, Seguin by 5–1, Wincenty Budzyński by 13½–6½, but he did lose 4–1 to Lecrivain.

In 1856 he beat Kowsky 11½–1½, and played another match against de Rivière, but unfortunately the latter score has been lost. Two years later he played the celebrated Russian novelist Ivan Turgenev in the Cafe Antonini in Rome, and won a game in 25 moves, giving odds of a pawn and ceding the first move. This game was later published in La Nuova Rivista degli Scacchi in 1880.

His best tournament performance came in the London tournament of 1862, where he placed 5th with 9 points, ahead of Wilhelm Steinitz, who later went on to become the first official world chess champion. Dubois won £10 in prize money, now roughly equivalent to £700.

=== Loses match against Steinitz, wins three other matches ===
After the tournament ended, Steinitz challenged Dubois to a match. The future World Champion beat his Italian opponent by 5½–3½.

Just over 100 years after this match, world champion-to-be Bobby Fischer, who was very interested in 19th-century chess, annotated in depth all nine games from it in his monthly column for Chess Life magazine in 1964 (April, July, August, November and December issues).

But Dubois did win several other matches that same year. He defeated Cornelius Bonetti by 11½–1½. He won two matches against Valentine Green: the first by 5–0 and the second 5½–½.

== Dubois and Italian chess ==
Dubois moved to the Netherlands in April 1863, and reputedly stayed for about two years. However, he couldn't get used to the cooler climate, and returned to Rome, where he concentrated on his writing and his promotion of the Italian rules of the game.

From the late 1850s to the early 1870s, Serafino Dubois corresponded regularly with French and Russian masters about how to achieve unity in the rules of chess. In particular, he was an avid supporter of free castling, which was permitted under the Italian rules of the game but not elsewhere in Europe. Under free castling, the King and Rook, after jumping over each other, could go to any square up to and including the other's starting point, provided neither piece attacked an enemy piece.

There were other significant differences in the Italian rules, too: taking a pawn "en passant" was forbidden, and pawns could only be promoted into pieces captured during the game. There was an added twist to the latter rule – if a pawn reached the eighth rank before any piece of its colour had been captured, it had to wait there 'suspended' until a piece was captured, at which time the promotion was possible.

Dubois discussed these issues in his writings of the time. In 1847 he became the editor of the first Italian chess column, L'Album in Rome, and by 1859 he was co-editor with Augusto Ferrante of the chess journal La Rivista degli Scacchi, which was also based in his home city. Between 1868 and 1873, he published a three-volume work on the differences in the rules between the Italian and French versions, in which he tried hard to defend the practice of free castling.

However, by the 1880s, Italy toed the line and adopted the normal European laws of chess, although it wasn't until the end of the century that the new rules were widely accepted throughout the country.

== Legacy ==
Dubois was Italy's best player during the 1850s and 1860s, and a strong tactician, in keeping with the style of his times.

He was very influential within the world of Italian chess and, not surprisingly, chess politics played a big part in his later life. In addition, he wrote many articles on chess openings.

Dubois has several variations named in his honour: a) a line of the Vienna Game; b) the Dubois Variation of the Hamppe-Muzio Gambit (C25); c) the Dubois Variation of the Giuoco Pianissimo (C50); d) the Dubois-Reti Defence in the Scotch Gambit (C44).

However, he was not a keen fan of the French Defence, and commented: "This is the most monotonous and annoying play you can imagine – rarely it gives rise to combinations of some interest".

== Death ==
Dubois died on 15 January 1899.
