= Vienna Game, Würzburger Trap =

Position: a8 black rook, b8 black knight, c8 black bishop, e8 black king, f8 black bishop, h8 black rook, a7 black pawn, b7 black pawn, c7 black pawn, f7 black pawn, g7 black pawn, h7 black pawn, d5 black pawn, e5 white pawn, e4 black knight, h4 black queen, c3 white knight, d3 white pawn, a2 white pawn, b2 white pawn, c2 white pawn, g2 white pawn, h2 white pawn, a1 white rook, c1 white bishop, d1 white queen, e1 white king, f1 white bishop, g1 white knight, h1 white rook

5...Qh4+ "initiates 'Würzburger's Trap'." (Korn)

The Würzburger Trap is a chess opening trap in the Vienna Gambit. It was named around 1930 for German banker Max Würzburger.

== The trap ==
1. e4 e5 2. Nc3 Nf6 3. f4

White plays the Vienna Gambit.

3... d5

Thought to be the best reply.

4. fxe5 Nxe4 5. d3

White also has lines beginning 5.Qf3 (Steinitz) and 5.Nf3, but neither achieves an advantage.

5... Qh4+?

Initiating the trap. Black has other choices 5...Bb4 and 5...Nxc3.

6. g3 Nxg3 7. Nf3 Qh5 8. Nxd5 Bg4

8...Nxh1? 9.Nxc7+ Kd8 10.Nxa8 leads to advantage for White.

9. Nf4

White can obtain the better game with 9.Bg2 Nxh1 (9...Bxf3 10.Qxf3 Qxe5+ 11.Kd1 Nxh1 12.Bf4 Qxb2 13.Qe4+ +− Hamann–Schvenkrantz, Germany 1965; 10...Qxf3 11.Bxf3 Nxa1 12.Nxc7+ Kd7 13.Nxa8 Bc5 14.Bxh1 Nc6 15.Bf4± Arhangel'skij–Popov, USSR 1958; Larsen) 10.Nxc7+ Kd7 (10...Kd8 11.Nxa8 Nc6 12.d4 Bxf3 13.Qxf3 Qxf3 14.Bxf3 Nxd4 15.Bg5+ Be7 16.Rd1+−; Larsen) 11.Nxa8 Nc6.

9... Bxf3 10. Nxh5 Bxd1 11. hxg3 Bxc2?

Black tries to win a pawn, but instead loses a piece.

12. b3

The black bishop on c2 is trapped; White will win it by playing Kd2 or Rh2 next turn.

Position: a8 black rook, b8 black knight, e8 black king, f8 black bishop, h8 black rook, a7 black pawn, b7 black pawn, c7 black pawn, f7 black pawn, g7 black pawn, h7 black pawn, e5 white pawn, h5 white knight, b3 white pawn, d3 white pawn, g3 white pawn, a2 white pawn, c2 black bishop, a1 white rook, c1 white bishop, e1 white king, f1 white bishop, h1 white rook

Position after 12.b3. The bishop on c2 is lost.
