= Wincenty Budzyński =

- Born: 1815; Volhynia, Russian Empire
- Died: May 5, 1866; Paris, France
- Other names: Budzinski, Budzinsky
- Education: Liceum Krzemienieckie
- Occupations: Political agent, Chess master
- Known for: Political agent of Hôtel Lambert; chess master at Café de la Régence
- Notable work: Matches vs. Kieseritzky, Dubois, Morphy, Harrwitz
- Movement: Polish émigré politics
- Spouse: French citizen (m. 1850)

Wincenty Budzyński (Budzinski, Budzinsky) (1815, Volhynia – 5 May 1866, Paris) was a Polish politician agent and Polish–French chess master.

Born into a Polish noble family in Volhynia, he graduated from the Liceum Krzemienieckie. He fought against Russians in the November Uprising in 1831. After being injured in a battle, he went to Kingdom of Galicia and Lodomeria, where was arrested by Austrians and expelled two years later. He arrived in England, then in Belgium, and finally in France. He became a political agent of Adam Jerzy Czartoryski - a prominent Polish-émigré political figure, head of a political faction accordingly called the Hôtel Lambert - in the 1840s. After a collapse of the Hungarian Revolution of 1848, he married a French woman in 1850, and withdrew from political activity.

He played chess at the famous Café de la Régence in Paris, where - among others - lost casual and formal matches to Lionel Kieseritzky (1 : 2) in 1850, Serafino Dubois (6.5 : 13.5) in 1855, Paul Morphy (1.5 : 5.5, Morphy gave odds of pawn and move) in 1858 and (0 : 7) in 1859, and beat Daniel Harrwitz (3 : 1, Harrwitz gave odds of pawn and move) in 1859.
