= Vienna Game =

Chess opening

Position: a8 black rook, b8 black knight, c8 black bishop, d8 black queen, e8 black king, f8 black bishop, g8 black knight, h8 black rook, a7 black pawn, b7 black pawn, c7 black pawn, d7 black pawn, f7 black pawn, g7 black pawn, h7 black pawn, e5 black pawn, e4 white pawn, c3 white knight, a2 white pawn, b2 white pawn, c2 white pawn, d2 white pawn, f2 white pawn, g2 white pawn, h2 white pawn, a1 white rook, c1 white bishop, d1 white queen, e1 white king, f1 white bishop, g1 white knight, h1 white rook
- Moves: 1.e4 e5 2.Nc3
- ECO: C25–C29
- Named after: Vienna, Austria
- Parent: Open Game

The Vienna Game is an opening in chess that begins with the moves:

1. e4 e5
2. Nc3

White develops the queen's knight instead of immediately committing to Nf3, White's most common second move. Black usually responds with either 2...Nf6 or 2...Nc6. The original idea behind the Vienna Game was to play a delayed King's Gambit with f4, but in modern play White often adopts a more quiet approach, such as by playing 3.Bc4 or 3.g3.

The opening became popular in the 19th century. A book reviewer wrote in the New York Times in 1888 that "... since Morphy only one new opening has been introduced, the 'Vienna'." Weaver W. Adams famously claimed that the Vienna Game led to a forced win for White. However, Nick de Firmian concludes in the 15th edition of Modern Chess Openings that the opening leads to equality with best play by both sides.

== Analysis ==
Black's most common response is 2...Nf6, which usually continues with 3.f4, 3.Bc4, 3.g3, or 3.Nf3. 2...Nc6 is also quite common. The opening features many transpositional opportunities, such as to the King's Gambit. Some lines listed below are sometimes assigned to the Bishop's Opening, but to the Vienna Game by ECO. Some lines are reached without any dominant method, such as the Berlin-Vienna Hybrid Variation, commonly reached by all of 2.Nc3 Nf6 3.Bc4 Nc6 4.d3, 2.Nc3 Nc6 3.Bc4 Nf6 4.d3, and 2.Bc4 (the Bishop's Opening) Nf6 3.d3 Nc6 4.Nc3.

Examined in this article are the following common variations:

- 2...Nf6 (Falkbeer Variation)
  - 3.f4 d5 (classical line)
    - 4.fxe5 Nxe4
      - 5.Nf3 (main line)
      - 5.Qf3 (Spielmann's move)
      - 5.d3 (originally unpopular but now more common)
        - 5...Qh4? (trap)
      - 5.Qe2 (Paulsen's move)
    - 4.exd5 (King's Gambit, by transposition)
    - 4.d3 (Steinitz Variation)
  - 3.f4 exf4?! (trap)
  - 3.Bc4 (Stanley Variation, also often assigned to Bishop's Opening)
    - 3...Nxe4 4.Qh5 (Frankenstein-Dracula Variation)
    - 3...Nxe4 4.Nf3 (Boden-Kieseritzky Gambit)
    - 3...Nc6 4.d3 (Berlin-Vienna Hybrid Variation)
    - 3...Bc5 (Spielmann Attack)
    - 3...Bb4 (Reversed Spanish Variation)
  - 3.g3 (Mieses Variation)
    - 3...d5 4.exd5 Nxd5 5.Bg2 Nxc3 6.bxc3 (main line)
  - 3.Nf3 Nc6 (Four Knights Game)
  - 3.Nf3 Bb4 (Petrov's Defense, Three Knights Game, by transposition)
  - 3.d4 exd4 4.Qxd4 Nc6 (Center Game, by transposition)
  - 3.a3 (Mengarini Variation)
- 2...Nc6 (Max Lange Defense)
  - 3.f4 exf4 (Vienna Gambit)
    - 4.Nf3 g5 5.h4 g4 6.Ng5 (Hamppe–Allgaier Gambit)
    - 4.Nf3 g5 5.Bc4 g4 6.0-0 (Hamppe–Muzio Gambit)
    - 4.Nf3 g5 5.d4 (Pierce Gambit)
    - 4.d4 (Steinitz Gambit)
  - 3.Bc4 Nf6 4.d3 (Berlin-Vienna Hybrid Variation)
  - 3.Bc4 Bc5 (Symmetrical Variation)
  - 3.g3 (Paulsen Variation)
  - 3.Nf3 (Three Knights Game)
  - 3.d4 (Fyfe Gambit)
- 2...Bc5 (Anderssen Defense)
  - 3.Nf3 d6 4.d4 exd4 5.Nxd4 (main line)
  - 3.Nf3 d6 4.Na4 (exchange line)
  - 3.Bc4 (Bishop's Opening, Classical Variation, by transposition)
  - 3.f4 d6 4.Nf3 (King's Gambit Declined, Classical Variation, by transposition)
- 2...d6
  - 3.Bc4 Nf6 4.d3
  - 3.f4 (Omaha Gambit)
  - 3.Nf3 (Philidor Defense, by transposition)
- 2...Bb4 (Zhuravlev Countergambit)

== Falkbeer Variation: 2...Nf6 3.f4 ==
Position: a8 black rook, b8 black knight, c8 black bishop, d8 black queen, e8 black king, f8 black bishop, h8 black rook, a7 black pawn, b7 black pawn, c7 black pawn, f7 black pawn, g7 black pawn, h7 black pawn, d5 black pawn, e5 white pawn, e4 black knight, c3 white knight, a2 white pawn, b2 white pawn, c2 white pawn, d2 white pawn, g2 white pawn, h2 white pawn, a1 white rook, c1 white bishop, d1 white queen, e1 white king, f1 white bishop, g1 white knight, h1 white rook

Falkbeer Variation, classical line: 2...Nf6 3.f4 d5 4.fxe5 Nxe4

2...Nf6 is the most common move and is named after Ernst Falkbeer. 3.f4 is the classical reply. Black usually plays 3...d5, striking back in the center with a similar idea to the Falkbeer Countergambit of the King's Gambit. Black should not accept the gambit as 3...exf4 4.e5 forces Black to retreat with 4...Ng8 (4...Qe7 is even weaker and can be met with 5.Qe2, forcing 5...Ng8). The classical main line continues 4.fxe5 Nxe4, reaching a sharp position. 5.Nf3, the traditional main move, 5.Qf3, and 5.d3 are all frequently played.

Anthony Santasiere and Weaver W. Adams, among others, have advocated the gambit, but it also receives criticism. Raymond Keene wrote that the gambit is considered too risky at the grandmaster level.

=== Main line: 3...d5 4.fxe5 Nxe4 5.Nf3 ===
Position: a8 black rook, d8 black queen, e8 black king, h8 black rook, a7 black pawn, b7 black pawn, e7 black bishop, f7 black pawn, g7 black pawn, h7 black pawn, c6 black knight, e6 black bishop, c5 black pawn, d5 black pawn, e5 white pawn, f4 white bishop, h4 white pawn, c3 white pawn, f3 white knight, a2 white pawn, b2 white pawn, c2 white pawn, e2 white queen, g2 white pawn, c1 white king, d1 white rook, f1 white bishop, h1 white rook

Breyer Variation, main line, 3.f4 d5 4.fxe5 Nxe4 5.Nf3 Be7 6.Qe2 Nxc3 7.dxc3 c5 8.Bf4 Nc6 9.0-0-0 Be6 10.h4

This is the most common continuation. White obtains open lines and attacking chances, but Black can usually hold the balance with correct play. Black's most common reply is 5...Be7, the Breyer Variation. Other options include 5...Nc6, 5...Bc5 (threatening 6...Bf2+), and 5...Bg4, usually continuing 6.Qe2, the Kaufmann Variation.

In the Breyer Variation, the most common line continues 6.Qe2 Nxc3 7.dxc3 c5 8.Bf4 Nc6 9.0-0-0 Be6. Common deviations include 6.d4, 6...f5, and 7.0-0. White then often launches an attack on the kingside, most often playing 10.h4 (or a later h4). Black often attempts to counterattack on the queenside, frequently playing ...Qa5 at some point.

=== Spielmann's line: 5.Qf3 ===
Position: a8 black rook, c8 black bishop, e8 black king, f8 black bishop, h8 black rook, a7 black pawn, b7 black pawn, c7 black pawn, f7 black pawn, g7 black pawn, h7 black pawn, c6 black knight, b5 white bishop, e5 white pawn, e4 black pawn, c3 white pawn, g3 white pawn, a2 white pawn, b2 white pawn, c2 white pawn, h2 white pawn, a1 white rook, c1 white bishop, e1 white king, g1 white knight, h1 white rook

Paulsen Attack, main line, 3.f4 d5 4.fxe5 Nxe4 5.Qf3 Nc6 6.Bb5 Nxc3 7.dxc3 Qh4+ 8.g3 Qe4+ 9.Qxe4 dxe4

This develops White's queen aggressively and is also quite common. It has been advocated by Ben Finegold. Black usually responds with 5...Nxc3, 5...Nc6, or 5...f5 (the Bardeleben Variation).

After 5...Nc6, play most often continues 6.Bb5 Nxc3 7.dxc3 (or 7.bxc3, with the same continuation) Qh4+ 8.g3 Qe4+ 9.Qxe4 dxe4, followed by either 10.Bxc6, inflicting doubled pawns on Black before the knight can be reinforced with 10...Bd7, or alternatively 10.Ne2, allowing 10...Bd7 and often continuing 11.Bxc6 Bxc6 anyway. A less common alternative is 6.Nxe4. Black usually responds with 6...Nd4 (6...dxe4 7.Qxe4 gives up a pawn), with the knight threatening both White's queen and a fork of White's king and rook with ...Nxc2+. The line typically continues 7.Qc3 dxe4 8.Ne2, with Black regaining the knight.

=== Oxford Variation: 5.d3 ===
This most often continues 5...Nxc3 6.bxc3 d4 7.Nf3 Nc6. Black also commonly plays 7...c5 or 7...dxc3. 6...Be7 and 6...c5 are also seen, as well as 6...Nc6, which typically transposes to the main line after 7.Nf3 d4. It can lead to the Würzburger Trap following 5...Qh4+.

=== 4.exd5 ===
This is White's most notable alternative to 4.fxe5. Black usually continues with 4...Nxd5, 4...exf4, or 4...e4.

After 4...Nxd5, 5.Nxd5 Qxd5 is fine for Black, while 5.fxe5 Nxc3 6.bxc3 Qh4+ forces White either to give up a rook with 7.g3 Qe4+ or to play 7.Ke2. White can also play 5.Nf3.

4...exf4 transposes to the Modern Defense of the King's Gambit Accepted after 5.Nf3 (or to the Bishop's Gambit after 5.Bc4), a line also frequently reached from the Schallopp Defense.

4...e4 enters the old main line of the Falkbeer Countergambit.

=== Other lines ===
- 3...d6 is the only sound alternative for Black, entering a line of the King's Gambit Declined. It most often continues 4.Nf3, followed by 4...Nc6, 4...Nbd7, 4...Bg4, 4...exf4, or 4...Be7. A frequent continuation is 4...Nc6 5.Bb5 Bd7 6.d3. The threat of Bxc6 followed by fxe5 (with ...dxe5 and then Nxe5 losing a pawn) leaves Black with no better option than 6...exf4 7.Bxf4, leaving White with a pleasant position.
- 3...Nc6? is weak due to 4.fxe5! Nxe5 5.d4, when both 5...Nc6 and 5...Ng6 are met by 6.e5 with a strong attack available for White.
- 4.d3 is the Steinitz Variation, usually continuing 4...exf4 or 4...d4.

== Mieses Variation: 2...Nf6 3.g3 ==
Position: a8 black rook, b8 black knight, c8 black bishop, d8 black queen, e8 black king, f8 black bishop, h8 black rook, a7 black pawn, b7 black pawn, c7 black pawn, d7 black pawn, f7 black pawn, g7 black pawn, h7 black pawn, f6 black knight, e5 black pawn, e4 white pawn, c3 white knight, g3 white pawn, a2 white pawn, b2 white pawn, c2 white pawn, d2 white pawn, f2 white pawn, h2 white pawn, a1 white rook, c1 white bishop, d1 white queen, e1 white king, f1 white bishop, g1 white knight, h1 white rook

Mieses Variation: 3.g3

The move 3.g3, the Mieses Variation, is a quiet continuation in which White fianchettoes the king's bishop, a line played by Vasily Smyslov on a few occasions, most notably in a win over Lev Polugaevsky in the 1961 USSR Championship. This fianchetto plan anticipated elements of the later hypermodern treatment of the opening. The best-known example is Mieses's brilliancy-prize game against Eugene Znosko-Borovsky at Ostend 1907.

The main line of the variation begins with 3...d5, usually continuing 4.exd5 Nxd5 5.Bg2 Nxc3 6.bxc3, followed by 6...Bd6, 6...Nc6, or 6...Bc5. Black also has the more quiet alternatives 3...Bc5 and 3...Nc6, which normally transposes into one of the other lines. White often plays 4.Bg2 and 5.Nge2.

== Stanley Variation: 2...Nf6 3.Bc4 ==
The move 3.Bc4 leads to a position which can also be reached from the Bishop's Opening (1.e4 e5 2.Bc4). Black's main choices are 3...Nxe4; 3...Bc5, which transposes to the King's Gambit Declined after 4.d3 d6 5.f4 Nc6 6.Nf3; 3...Nc6, usually continuing 4.d3, entering the Berlin-Vienna Hybrid Variation, followed by 4...Na5, 4...Bc5, or 4...Bb4; and 3...Bb4, after which 4.f4 Nxe4 5.Qh5 0-0 leads to wild but probably equal play, or White may play 4.d3, 4.Nge2, or 4.Nf3.

After 3...Nxe4, White usually plays 4.Qh5 (threatening Qxf7#), and Black almost always replies with 4...Nd6. After 5.Bb3, Black can either go for the relatively quiet waters of 5...Be7 6.Nf3 Nc6 7.Nxe5, known as the Alekhine Variation, or the complexities of 5...Nc6 6.Nb5 g6 7.Qf3 f5 8.Qd5 Qe7 (or 8...Qf6 with the same continuation) 9.Nxc7+ Kd8 10.Nxa8 b6, which the Irish correspondence chess player and theorist Tim Harding extravagantly dubbed "the Frankenstein–Dracula Variation". White can also instead trade queens with 5.Qxe5+ Qe7 (5...Be7 allows 6.Qxg7) 6.Qxe7+ Bxe7.

If White instead plays 4.Nxe4, this permits the fork 4...d5. 4.Bxf7+ is considered weak, though after 4...Kxf7 5.Nxe4 d5! (inferior is 5...Nc6 6.Qf3+, when Black cannot play 6...Kg8?? because of 7.Ng5, while 6...Ke8 leaves the king awkwardly placed in the center) 6.Qf3+ (6.Qh5+ g6 7.Qxe5? Bh6! wins for Black) Kg8 7.Ng5!? (hoping for 7...Qxg5?? 8.Qxd5+ and mate the next move, Qd7!, with a large advantage for Black in view of having the bishop pair and a strong pawn center. 4.Nf3 is another option, entering the Boden–Kieseritzky Gambit.

== Vienna Gambit: 2...Nc6 3.f4 exf4 ==
With 3.f4, White sacrifices a pawn to gain control of the center, with a similar idea to the King's Gambit. The term "Vienna Gambit" traditionally applies to the move sequence 2...Nc6 3.f4. It is frequently used online to refer to the equivalent move in the Falkbeer Variation (2...Nf6 3.f4).

=== Steinitz Gambit: 4.d4 ===
Position: a8 black rook, c8 black bishop, e8 black king, f8 black bishop, g8 black knight, h8 black rook, a7 black pawn, b7 black pawn, c7 black pawn, d7 black pawn, f7 black pawn, g7 black pawn, h7 black pawn, c6 black knight, d4 white pawn, e4 white pawn, f4 black pawn, h4 black queen, c3 white knight, a2 white pawn, b2 white pawn, c2 white pawn, e2 white king, g2 white pawn, h2 white pawn, a1 white rook, c1 white bishop, d1 white queen, f1 white bishop, g1 white knight, h1 white rook

Steinitz Gambit after 4.d4 Qh4+ 5.Ke2

The Steinitz Gambit, 1.e4 e5 2.Nc3 Nc6 3.f4 exf4 4.d4, was a favourite of Wilhelm Steinitz, the first World Champion. White allows Black to misplace White's king with 4...Qh4+ 5.Ke2 (see diagram), hoping to prove that White's pawn center and the exposed position of Black's queen are more significant factors. Unlike Steinitz, who famously opined that, "The King is a fighting piece!", few modern players are willing to expose their king this way, and the Steinitz Gambit is rarely seen today.

=== Hamppe–Muzio Gambit: 4.Nf3 g5 5.Bc4 g4 6.0-0 ===
Position: a8 black rook, c8 black bishop, d8 black queen, e8 black king, f8 black bishop, g8 black knight, h8 black rook, a7 black pawn, b7 black pawn, c7 black pawn, d7 black pawn, f7 black pawn, h7 black pawn, c6 black knight, c4 white bishop, e4 white pawn, f4 black pawn, c3 white knight, f3 white queen, a2 white pawn, b2 white pawn, c2 white pawn, d2 white pawn, g2 white pawn, h2 white pawn, a1 white rook, c1 white bishop, f1 white rook, g1 white king

Hamppe–Muzio Gambit after 6.0-0 gxf3 7.Qxf3

This extremely sharp gambit is usually followed by gxf3 7.Qxf3 (see diagram). As with its close relative in the King's Gambit, the Muzio Gambit, White sacrifices the knight on f3 in return for a powerful attack against the black king. It is named after Austrian theoretician Carl Hamppe and classified under ECO code C25. The Dubois Variation continues 7...Ne5 8.Qxf4 Qf6.

=== Hamppe–Allgaier Gambit: 4.Nf3 g5 5.h4 g4 6.Ng5 ===
This is another extremely sharp line that resembles the Allgaier Gambit of the King's Gambit. Unlike in that line, after 5...g4, White cannot play 6.Ne5, which would be the equivalent of the Kieseritzky Gambit, due to Black's knight on c6. Black's knight is not particularly useful in defending against White's attack after 6.Ng5, however.

=== Pierce Gambit: 4.Nf3 g5 5.d4 ===
The Pierce Gambit, 3...exf4 4.Nf3 g5 5.d4, usually continues 5...g4 6.Bc4, and is also often reached by transposition with 5.Bc4 g4 6.d4. It is also frequently reached from the Quaade Gambit of the King's Gambit. After this, the most common continuation is 6...gxf3, followed by 7.0-0 or 7.Qxf3, with White sacrificing a knight for activity. Black's main fifth-move alternative is 5...d6, a line also frequently reached from the Fischer Defense of the King's Gambit. 5...Bg7 is also played but is less well regarded.

== Paulsen Variation: 2...Nc6 3.g3 ==
Louis Paulsen played 1.e4 e5 2.Nc3 four times with the white pieces – games against Meitner, Rosenthal, Gelbfuhs, and Bird in the Vienna 1873 chess tournament. Three wins with the variation 1.e4 e5 2.Nc3 Nc6 3.g3 named the "Paulsen Variation" of the Vienna Game, and the fourth win after 1.e4 e5 2.Nc3 Bc5 3.Nf3 vs. Henry Bird.

== Symmetrical Variation: 2...Nc6 3.Bc4 Bc5 ==
Position: a8 black rook, c8 black bishop, d8 black queen, e8 black king, g8 black knight, h8 black rook, a7 black pawn, b7 black pawn, c7 black pawn, d7 black pawn, f7 black pawn, g7 black pawn, h7 black pawn, c6 black knight, c5 black bishop, e5 black pawn, c4 white bishop, e4 white pawn, g4 white queen, c3 white knight, a2 white pawn, b2 white pawn, c2 white pawn, d2 white pawn, f2 white pawn, g2 white pawn, h2 white pawn, a1 white rook, c1 white bishop, e1 white king, g1 white knight, h1 white rook

Symmetrical Variation, main line, 2...Nc6 3.Bc4 Bc5 4.Qg4

White's most common move after 2...Nc6, the Max Lange Defense, is 3.Bc4. Black most often replies with the solid 3...Nf6, but an alternative is 3.Bc4 Bc5. White's move 4.Qg4 is awkward to meet. 4...Kf8 and 4...g6 are thought the best moves, but neither is too appealing for Black. The natural 4...Qf6?? loses to 5.Nd5! Qxf2+ 6.Kd1, when White's king is in no real danger, and White has multiple threats: 7.Qxg7; 7.Nxc7+; and 7.Nh3 Qd4 8.d3 threatening to trap Black's queen with 9.c3. Despite this, 3...Bc5 still sees play.

== Anderssen Defense: 2...Bc5 ==
Position: a8 black rook, b8 black knight, c8 black bishop, d8 black queen, e8 black king, g8 black knight, h8 black rook, a7 black pawn, b7 black pawn, c7 black pawn, d7 black pawn, f7 black pawn, g7 black pawn, h7 black pawn, c5 black bishop, e5 black pawn, e4 white pawn, c3 white knight, a2 white pawn, b2 white pawn, c2 white pawn, d2 white pawn, f2 white pawn, g2 white pawn, h2 white pawn, a1 white rook, c1 white bishop, d1 white queen, e1 white king, f1 white bishop, g1 white knight, h1 white rook

2...Bc5

This is an offbeat but playable alternative, as played (for example) by former world champion José Raúl Capablanca against Ilya Kan at Moscow 1936. Some possible moves are 3.Bc4, 3.Nf3, and 3.f4. With move 3.Bc4, ...Nf6 and ...Nc6 can be found above, or Black can play ...d6.

White can continue with 3.Nf3, and if the move 3...Nc6?! (transposing to the Three Knights Game) 4.Nxe5! Nxe5 5.d4 Bd6 6.dxe5 Bxe5 7.Bd3 leads to a large advantage for White. Stronger is 3...d6! Then 4.Na4 Nd7 5.d3 Ngf6 6.Be2 0-0 7.0-0 c6 8.Nxc5 Nxc5 9.Ne1 Ne6 10.c3 d5 is about even. The main line runs 4.d4 exd4 5.Nxd4 Nf6 6.Bg5 (6.Be2 d5 7.e5 Ne4 8.0-0 Nxc3 leads to equality) h6 7.Bh4 0-0 8.Nb3 and now de Firmian in MCO-15 gives 8...Bb4 9.Bd3 Re8 10.0-0 Bxc3 11.bxc3 g5! 12.Bg3 Nxe4, when Black's "chances are at least equal".

After 3.f4, ...d6 leads to the King's Gambit Declined. Weak is 3.Qg4 Nf6! 4.Qxg7 Rg8 5.Qh6 Bxf2+ when Black had a large advantage in Tsikhelashvili–Karpov, USSR 1968, since 6.Kxf2?? Ng4+ would win White's queen.

Another offbeat possibility is 3.Na4, the Hamppe Variation, when 3...Bxf2+! 4.Kxf2 Qh4+ 5.Ke3 Qf4+ 6.Kd3 d5 leads to wild complications favouring Black, as in the famous Immortal Draw game Hamppe–Meitner, Vienna 1872. The quiet 3...Be7, however, leaves Black with a good game.

== Other lines ==
- 2...Nf6 3.a3, sometimes called Mengarini's Opening – though Ariel Mengarini actually advocated the move order 1.e4 e5 2 a3, after which 2...Nf6 3.Nc3 transposes; it was Hugh Myers who inserted 2.Nc3 Nf6 before pushing the a-pawn – is not a serious try for advantage but is essentially a useful waiting move that gives White an improved version of Black's position after 1.e4 e5 2.Nf3 Nc6. First, the "Reversed Ruy Lopez" with 3...Bb4 is ruled out. Second, after 3...d5, 4.exd5 Nxd5 5.Qh5!? gives White an improved version of the Steinitz Variation of the Scotch Game, since Black can never play ...Nb4, an important idea for White in the mirror-image position. Third, after 3...Bc5, 4.Nf3 gives a reversed Two Knights Defense. Then the typical 4...Ng4 may be met by 5.d4 exd4 6.Na4, when 6...Bb4+, White's usual move in the mirror-image position, is impossible. After 4...Ng4, White may also play improved versions of the Ulvestad Variation (6.b4 in the above line) and Fritz Variation (6.Nd5 c6 7.b4), since when White plays b4, the pawn is protected, unlike in the mirror-image position. If Black plays more quietly with 3...Bc5 4.Nf3 Nc6, then 5.Nxe5! Nxe5 6.d4 gives White some advantage. The best line for Black may be 3...Bc5 4.Nf3 d5 5.exd5 0-0 (better than 5...e4 6.d4, when the normal 6...Bb4 is impossible). Also possible is 3...Bc5 4.Nf3 d6, leading to a reversed position of the Giuoco Piano after 5.Bc4, while 5.d4 exd4 6.Nxd4 gives White little or no advantage. Also good for Black is 3...Nc6, when 4.Bc4 can be met with the familiar sacrifice 4...Nxe4, while 4.Nf3 leads to the Gunsberg Variation of the Scotch Four Knights Game.
- 2...Nc6 3.Nf3 transposes to the Three Knights Game, which most often leads to the Four Knights Game after 3...Nf6.
- 2...d6 is occasionally seen. A common quieter line is 3.Bc4 Nf6 4.d3. White also has the sharp alternative 3.f4 (the Omaha Gambit), or may transpose to the Philidor Defense with 3.Nf3.

== See also ==
- List of chess openings
- List of chess openings named after places
- Vienna Game, Würzburger Trap
