= Francis Kowsky =

American architectural historian

Francis ("Frank") R. Kowsky (born 1943) is a notable architectural historian and State University of New York (SUNY) Distinguished Professor of Fine Arts at Buffalo State College, SUNY, Buffalo, New York. He has published books and articles about nineteenth-century American architects such as Frederick Withers, Calvert Vaux, and H. H. Richardson, as well as the architecture and landscape of Buffalo and northwestern New York State. He is active in the field of historic preservation having served on the New York State Board for Historic Preservation, and the Board of Directors of the Preservation Coalition of Erie County, New York, and currently serving as a trustee of the National Association for Olmsted Parks.

== Writings ==
Authored Books

- Kowsky, Francis R., The Architecture of Frederick Clarke Withers and the Progress of the Gothic Revival in America after 1850, Wesleyan University Press, Middletown CT 1980; ISBN 0-8195-5041-8
- Kowsky, Francis R., Buffalo Architecture: A Guide, MIT Press, Cambridge MA and London 1981; ISBN 0-262-52063-X
- Kowsky, Francis R., Country, Park & City: The Architecture and Life of Calvert Vaux, Oxford University Press, New York 1998; ISBN 0-19-511495-7
- Kowsky, Francis R., The Best Planned City in the World: Olmsted, Vaux, and the Buffalo Park System, Library of American Landscape History, Amherst, MA 2018; ISBN 978-1-952620-27-0
- Kowsky, Francis R. with Lucille Gordon, Hell on Color, Sweet on Song. Jacob Wrey Mould and the Artful Beauty of Central Park, Fordham University Press, New York 2023; ISBN 9781531502577

Articles

- Kowsky, Francis R., "The Architecture of Frederick C. Withers (1828-1901)," Journal of the Society of Architectural Historians 35, No. 2 (May, 1976), pp. 83-107
- Kowsky, Francis R., "H.H. Richardson's Project for the Young Men's Association Library in Buffalo," Niagara Frontier 25/2 (1978), pp. 29–35
- Kowsky, Francis R., "The William Dorsheimer House: A Reflection of French Suburban Architecture in the Early Work of H. H. Richardson," Art Bulletin 62 (March 1980), pp. 321–147
- Kowsky, Francis R., "Municipal Parks and City Planning: Frederick Law Olmsted's Buffalo Park and Parkway System," Journal of the Society of Architectural Historians 46, No. 1 (March 1987), pp. 49–64
- Kowsky, Francis R., "H. H. Richardson's Ames Gate Lodge and the Romantic Landscape Tradition," Journal of the Society of Architectural Historians, 50/2 (June 1991), pp. 181–188.
- Kowsky, Francis R., "From Newburgh to Brookline: The Rise of Landscape in American Culture," View 16, (Summer 2016), pp. 36–41
