= Atanas Kolev =

Bulgarian chess grandmaster (born 1967)

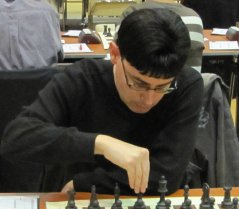

Personal information
- Born: July 15, 1967 (age 58) Botevgrad, Bulgaria

Chess career
- Country: Bulgaria
- Title: Grandmaster (1993)
- FIDE rating: 2529 (July 2026)
- Peak rating: 2604 (July 2012)

Atanas Kolev (Bulgarian: Атанас Колев; born July 15, 1967) is a Bulgarian chess grandmaster. His highest rating was in July 2012 at 2604 points. Kolev was the coach of the Bulgarian women's national chess team 2004–2006. Kolev and fellow Bulgarian grandmaster Kiril Georgiev are co-authors of the best-seller The Sharpest Sicilian, a book about the Najdorf Variation of the Sicilian Defense, which was published in 2007. Five years after the first edition, the book was completely rewritten and redesigned and "The Sharpest Sicilian 2012" was published in October 2012. Atanas and Macedonian grandmaster Trajko Nedev are co-authors of The Easiest Sicilian, a book about the Sveshnikov Variation of the Sicilian, which was published in 2008.

He won the 33rd Plovdiv Open 2011, shared first place with GM Cheparinov at Albena Open 2011, won the 20th annual Midway Championship in Chicago 2011, and the First Annual International Chess Festival in Detroit 2011. He won five of the six tournaments he played in 2011 and by the end of that year he had accomplished a remarkable career milestone: he had won (or shared first place) 60 international chess tournaments (1988–2011, active chess tournaments included).
