= White and Black in chess =

Chess convention for first and second player

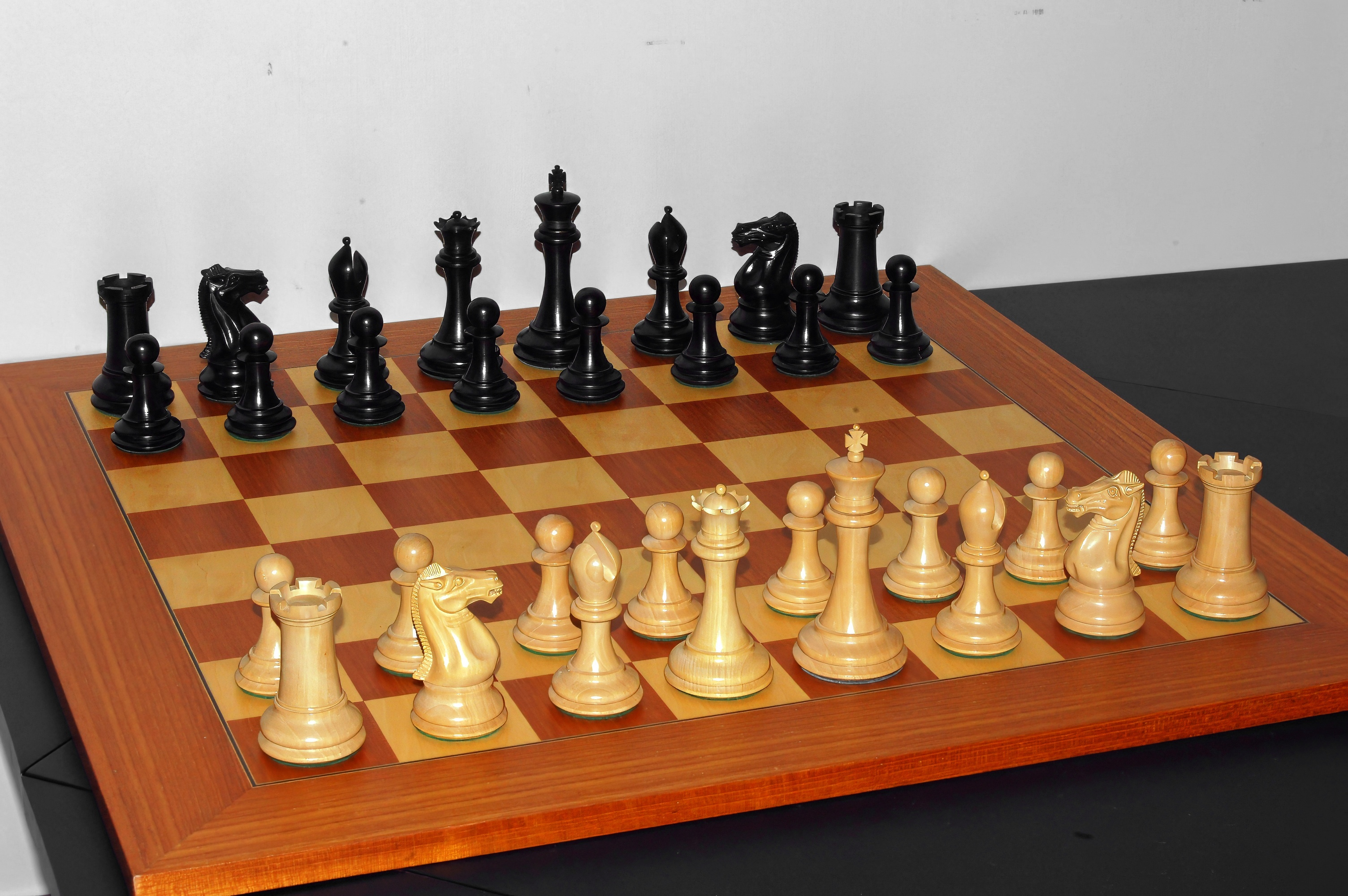
In this chess set, the white pieces are tan in color.

In chess, the player who moves first is called White, and the player who moves second is called Black. Their pieces are the white pieces and the black pieces. The pieces are often not literally white and black, but usually contrasting light and dark colors. The 64 squares of the chessboard, which is colored in a checkered pattern, are likewise the "white squares" or "light squares", and "black squares" or "dark squares"; they are usually of contrasting light and dark color rather than literally white and black. For example, the squares on vinyl boards may be off-white ("buff") and green, while those on wood boards are often light brown and dark brown.

white: 1. There are 16 light-colored pieces and 32 squares called white. 2. When capitalized, the word refers to the player of the white pieces.

An entry in the Glossary of terms in the Laws of Chess at the end of the current FIDE laws also appears for Black.

In old chess writings, the sides are often called Red and Black because those were the two colors of ink then commonly available when hand-drawing or printing chess position diagrams.

== History ==
Early descriptions of chess, such as the Versus de scachis, usually describe the pieces as red and white, with black and white pieces coming later.

As Howard Staunton observed, "In the earlier ages of chess, the board was simply divided into sixty-four squares, without any difference of colour". The checkering of the squares was a European innovation, introduced in the thirteenth century.

The convention of White having the first move is much more recent than that. François-André Danican Philidor in the original (1749) edition of his famous treatise Analyse du jeu des Échecs cited a game in which Black moved first. Johann Horny, in a book published in Germany in 1824, wrote that Black moves first. Phillip Sergeant wrote in his book A History of British Chess of the great Alexander McDonnell (1798–1835), remembered today for his series of matches with Labourdonnais:

He preferred to have Black, as first player as well as second ... this was a common fad in his day, which persisted with a great number of players, as a study of the Chess Players' Chronicle and other magazines shows.

Some sources report that in the Immortal Game (Anderssen–Kieseritzky, offhand game, London 1851), one of the most famous games in history, Anderssen had the Black pieces but moved first. He also took the Black pieces but moved first in the sixth, eighth, and tenth games of his famous 1858 match against Paul Morphy. Each of those games began 1.a3 e5 2.c4, when Anderssen was effectively playing the Sicilian Defense with an extra tempo.

As late as the mid-to-late 19th century, the practice of White moving first had not yet become standard. George Walker in his popular treatise The Art of Chess-Play: A New Treatise on the Game of Chess (4th edition 1846), set forth the rules of London's St George's Chess Club in June 1841. "Law III" provided that the player who moved first had the choice of color; if the players played more games at the same sitting, the first move would alternate, but each player would continue to use the same colored pieces as he had in the first game. Staunton observed in 1871 that "many players still cultivate the foolish habit of playing exclusively with one colour."

On October 19, 1857, Mr. Perrin, the Secretary of the New York Chess Club, informed those assembled at the First American Chess Congress that he had received a letter from Johann Löwenthal, a leading English master, "suggesting the advisableness of always giving the first move in public games, to the player of the white pieces". Löwenthal also wrote that London's chess clubs had adopted a new rule that White always moves first. The club evidently did not follow Löwenthal's advice, since in its match the following year against its Philadelphia counterpart, Philadelphia played White in both games, but moved first only in the second game.

Chess historian Robert John McCrary writes that the earliest rule he has found requiring that White move first is Rule 9 given on page 126 of the New York, 1880 tournament book, which specified, "In each round the players shall have the first move alternately; in the first game it shall be determined by lot. The one having the move, in every case, is to play with the white pieces." McCrary observes:

Prior to that, it had gradually become conventional, over a number of years, to have White move first in published analysis, and by about 1862 to have White move first in all published games. But it was evident that players could in many cases choose Black when they had the first move, even if the published game-score indicated that White had moved first.

Three years after the example cited by McCrary, the "Revised International Chess Code" issued at the London 1883 tournament (one of the strongest in history) provided that the player who won by lot the right to move first had the choice of color.

In 1889, Wilhelm Steinitz, the first World Champion, wrote that "In all international and public Chess matches and tournaments ... it is the rule for the first player to have the white men". Emanuel Lasker, the second World Champion, stated in Lasker's Manual of Chess (first published in 1927) that "White makes the first move".

== First-move advantage ==
There has been debate among chess players since at least the 18th century about whether playing first gives White a significant advantage. Statistical analysis shows that White scores between 52 and 56 percent at most levels of play, with White's margin increasing as the standard of play improves.

== See also ==
- Chess equipment
- Rules of chess
