= Economical mate =

Special checkmate position

Economical mate

Position: f8 black rook, a7 black king, a6 white knight, b6 black pawn, h5 black pawn, b4 white pawn, e4 black bishop, g4 black pawn, h4 white pawn, e3 white pawn, f3 black rook, a2 white rook, f2 white pawn, g2 white king, h2 white bishop

A mate in one problem with White to move, given by László Polgár. The answer, 1. Nc5#, is a discovered check which gives an economical mate. Once the move is made, all three of White's remaining pieces (Note: In chess literature, the word piece is commonly used to refer to the more powerful units, all units other than the pawns. However, in some contexts it may refer to all material on the board, including the pawns.) apart from the king—the knight, the bishop and the rook—help to prevent the black king from moving to any of its flight squares. White's king and pawns do not contribute to the mating attack.

In chess, an economical mate is a checkmate position such that all of the attacker's remaining knights, bishops, rooks and queens contribute to the mate. The attacker's king and pawns may also contribute, but their assistance is not required, nor does it disqualify the position from being an economical mate. Economical mates are of interest to chess problem composers for their aesthetic value. In real gameplay, their occurrence is incidental; nevertheless, some notable games have concluded with an economical mate, such as the Opera game.

In chess problem composition, the concept of an economical mate is motivated by the aesthetic notion of economy of force, the idea that a composition is simpler and more beautiful when minimal material is used to maximal effect. When all of the attacker's pieces (apart from the king and pawns) contribute to a checkmate, it means that none of the more powerful units have been left unused, an economical use of material.

Economical mate is one of a few terms used by composers to describe the properties of checkmate positions; related concepts include pure mate, model mate and ideal mate. A pure mate is a position such that the mated king is attacked once and prevented from moving to any of the adjacent squares in its field for exactly one reason per square. Model mate and ideal mate are both stronger forms of pure mate. When a checkmate is both "pure and economical", it is said to be a model mate. When, in a pure mate, all material on the board of either color plays a direct role in the checkmate, it is said to be an ideal mate.

== Definition ==
An economical mate is a checkmate position such that all of the attacker's pieces other than the king and pawns contribute to the checkmate. This definition neither requires the king or pawns to contribute to the mating attack, nor that their participation disqualifies a position from being an economical mate. All that is required is that all of the player's other remaining pieces—whether knights, bishops, rooks or queens—play a direct role in the checkmate.

In his Dictionary of Modern Chess, Byrne J. Horton gave a similar definition:

ECONOMICAL MATE: A term used by problem composers to indicate a mating situation in which every one of White's chesspieces on the board is utilized in some way, with the optional exception of the King and Pawns.

Horton's definition assumes a historical norm in chess problems, in which White is the attacking and mating side, while Black is the mated and losing side. The color roles can also be reversed, however.

== Examples ==
=== The "Opera Game" ===
Morphy vs. The Count of Brunswick and Duke Isouard, 1858

Position: b8 black knight, d8 white rook, e8 black king, f8 black bishop, h8 black rook, a7 black pawn, f7 black pawn, g7 black pawn, h7 black pawn, e6 black queen, e5 black pawn, g5 white bishop, e4 white pawn, a2 white pawn, b2 white pawn, c2 white pawn, f2 white pawn, g2 white pawn, h2 white pawn, c1 white king

Final position after 17.Rd8#. White has played an economical mate with his remaining bishop and rook The king and pawns are uninvolved.

In 1858, the American master Paul Morphy visited Europe to play against the continent's leading masters. Morphy won several matches against Europe's best players, and he also engaged in casual and exhibition play.

One of Morphy's best-known casual games was a miniature and consultation game, played against two members of the European nobility while Morphy was in Paris. The game was played in a box at an opera house while an opera was performed onstage, hence its name. While Morphy controlled the white pieces, his opponents jointly decided each move for the black pieces. Morphy quickly mated his opponents following rapid development and a queen sacrifice. In the final position, Morphy's remaining bishop and rook were used to give an economical mate. The position nearly qualifies as a pure mate (and thus as a model mate), but it fails on one point: the black king cannot access f8 both because it is occupied by a friendly bishop and because the square is guarded by the checking rook.

The Opera Game is frequently reproduced in chess primers as a tool to teach the importance of rapid development.

=== The "Immortal Game" ===
Anderssen vs. Kieseritzky, 1851

Position: a8 black rook, c8 black bishop, d8 black king, h8 black rook, a7 black pawn, d7 black pawn, e7 white bishop, f7 black pawn, g7 white knight, h7 black pawn, a6 black knight, f6 black knight, b5 black pawn, d5 white knight, e5 white pawn, h5 white pawn, g4 white pawn, d3 white pawn, a2 white pawn, c2 white pawn, e2 white king, a1 black queen, g1 black bishop

Final position of a frequently reproduced continuation, after 23.Be7#. A model mate, with White the winner.

The Immortal Game was a casual game played by Adolf Anderssen and Lionel Kieseritzky in 1851. Anderssen allowed a double rook sacrifice in order to develop an attack using his remaining minor pieces. Hooper, Whyld and Kasparov report that Kieseritzky resigned the game following 20.Ke2. However, the continuation 20...Na6 21.Nxg7+ Kd8 22.Qf6+ Nxf6 23.Be7# is commonly reported in treatments of the game. If played, this continuation would have resulted in an economical mate, while also being a pure mate, and thus by definition a model mate. Kasparov described the continuation as both "pure" and "economic", adjectives which, taken together, are synonymous with a model mate.

Objectively the game is rather weak and superficial, but what a finish! After sacrificing both rooks, a bishop and a queen, the mate was simultaneously pure, economic and smooth!

=== Keres vs. Fischer, 1959 ===
Keres vs. Fischer, 1959

Position: c6 white pawn, d5 white king, e5 black queen, f5 black king, c4 white rook, g4 black pawn

Final position. A relatively simple economical mate, assisted by the black king.

During the 1959 Candidates Tournament, Paul Keres lost a game to a young Bobby Fischer, which ended with a simple checkmate satisfying the conditions of economical mate. In the final position, the black queen gave mate with assistance from the black king. As the black king contributed additional attacking force along the e-file, the final position was neither pure, model, nor ideal.

== Bibliography ==
- Hooper, David; Whyld, Kenneth (1996) [first pub. 1992]. The Oxford Companion to Chess (second ed.). Oxford: Oxford University Press. ISBN 9780198661641.
- Horton, Byrne J. (1959). Dictionary of Modern Chess. Philosophical Library.
