= Pure mate =

Special checkmate position

Pure mate

Position: c7 white king, f7 white bishop, c5 black pawn, d5 black king, e4 black knight, f3 white knight

A composed example of a pure mate. The black king is attacked once. Every square surrounding the king is covered exactly once: c6 and d6 are attacked by the white king, e6 is attacked by the white bishop, e5 and d4 are attacked by the white knight, and e4 and c5 are each blocked by black units which are not also attacked by white units. c4 is guarded by the white bishop.

In chess, a pure mate is a checkmate position such that the mated king is attacked exactly once, and prevented from moving to any of the adjacent squares in its field for exactly one reason per square. Each of the squares in the mated king's field is attacked or "guarded" by one—and only one—attacking unit, or else a square which is not attacked is occupied by a friendly unit, a unit of the same color as the mated king. Some authors allow that special situations involving double check or pins may also be considered as pure mate.

Pure mates are of interest to chess problem composers for their aesthetic value. In real gameplay, their occurrence is incidental. Nevertheless, several famous games have concluded with a pure mate, including the Immortal Game and the Evergreen Game, both won by Adolf Anderssen; the Peruvian Immortal; and the Game of the Century, an early brilliancy won by Bobby Fischer. Siegbert Tarrasch was fond of pure mates, often pointing them out when they occurred.

Pure mate is one of a few terms used by composers to describe the properties of a checkmate position; related concepts include economical mate, model mate, and ideal mate. An economical mate is a position such that all of the attacker's pieces (Note: In chess literature, the word piece is commonly used to refer to the more powerful units, all units other than the pawns. In some contexts, however, it may refer to all material on the board, including the pawns.) contribute to the checkmate, with the (optional) exception of the king and the pawns. (Note: In an economical mate, the king and pawns may play a role in the checkmate, but it is not required.) The model mate and the ideal mate are both stronger forms of pure mate. When a checkmate is both "pure and economical", it is said to be a model mate. When, in a pure mate, all material on the board of either color plays a direct role in the checkmate, it is said to be an ideal mate.

== Definitions ==
A pure mate is a checkmate position such that each of the squares in the king's field is guarded, attacked, or blocked in exactly one way, while the king itself is attacked exactly once. In practice, this means that for each of the squares in the king's field, there is exactly one reason why the mated king cannot be moved to that square to escape check. (Note: According to Hooper and Whyld, the king's field as-such consists only of the squares adjacent to the king, and does not include the square occupied by the king itself: "It is incorrect to include the square on which the king stands as part of the field." Nevertheless, inspection of the king's field—together with the square on which it stands—is important both to confirm checkmate, and also to investigate whether a pure mate exists.) Some authors omit the detail that the mated king itself is attacked only once. In his Dictionary of Modern Chess, Byrne J. Horton provided the following definition:

PURE MATE: A mating problem situation in which every square next to the black King is guarded by a single white man or occupied by a black man.

Horton's definition assumes a historical norm in chess problems, in which White is the attacking and mating side, while Black is the mated and losing side. However, the concept of a pure mate is also applicable to positions in which Black is the mating side.

In the Oxford Companion to Chess, David Hooper and Kenneth Whyld gave a more complex definition, allowing for exceptions in the cases of pins and double check:

pure mate, or clean mate, a checkmate that meets the following criteria: unoccupied squares in the king's field are attacked once only; pieces that function as self-blocks (Note: Hooper and Whyld use the term "self-block" to refer to squares in the king's field which are occupied by friendly units of the same color.) are not under attack unless necessarily pinned; and the mating move is not a double check unless this is necessary to prevent the defender from interposing a man or capturing a checking piece. (Note: The composer Gady Costeff noted that this definition does not stipulate that squares in the mated king's field occupied by attacking units must be defended or "covered" exactly once, contrary to the spirit of the basic concept of a pure mate. He also noted that several definitions of pure mate have been given which, although they convey the basic concept, can be construed as having imprecise wording and can be read as mutually incompatible definitions.)

== Examples ==
=== Steinkühler vs. Blackburne, 1863 ===
Steinkühler vs. Blackburne, 1863

Position: a8 black rook, f8 black rook, h8 black king, a7 black pawn, b7 black pawn, g7 black pawn, h7 black pawn, d6 black pawn, d5 white bishop, b3 white queen, c3 white knight, g3 white pawn, h3 black bishop, a2 white pawn, b2 white pawn, f2 black knight, g2 white king, h2 white pawn, a1 white rook, g1 white rook

The final position, a pure mate

After providing their own definition, Hooper and Whyld cited a miniature won by Joseph Henry Blackburne against Alexander Steinkühler as an example of pure mate with Black as the mating side. Playing as Black and beginning with Black's 19th move, Blackburne initiated an attack on White's kingside consisting of three consecutive checks (19...Qxf2+ 20.Kh1 Qg1+ 21.Rxg1 Nf2+ 22.Kg2) such that after each check, White had exactly one legal forced response, involving a queen sacrifice. Black then played his only available check (and mate) 22...Bh3#, a pure mate in which Black's knight, light-squared bishop and king's rook coordinated with each other to give mate.

In the final position, the White king occupied a square away from the board's edge, such that its field consisted of the maximum eight squares. The three squares g1, h2 and g3 were blocked by friendly pieces (referred to by Hooper and Whyld as self-blocks), none of which were also attacked by opposing units. h1 and h3 were attacked (or guarded) by the knight, and f3 and f2 were attacked (or guarded) by the king's rook. The square f1 is not attacked by the rook (the knight limits its line of attack); however, it is guarded by the bishop in that although the bishop may be said not to attack the square in the given position, the king is nevertheless prevented from fleeing along the bishop's line of attack, as it would remain in check. For this reason, some authors prefer to use the word "guarded" rather than "attacked" to describe such limitations on the king's movement. In any case, the king itself is attacked exactly once by the bishop, and is prevented from moving to any of the squares in its field for exactly one reason per square. Although it is a pure mate, the position is not an economical mate, as Black's queen's rook does not contribute to the checkmate. It is therefore also not a model mate, and thus also not an ideal mate.

Giuoco Piano (ECO C54)
1.e4 e5 2.Nf3 Nc6 3.Bc4 Bc5 4.c3 Nf6 5.d4 exd4 6.cxd4 Bb4+ 7.Bd2 Bxd2+ 8.Nfxd2 Nxd4 9.0-0 d6 10.Nb3 Nxb3 11.Qxb3 0-0 12.Re1 Nh5 13.e5 Qg5 14.exd6 Nf4 15.Bxf7+ Kh8 16.g3 cxd6 17.Nc3 Nh3+ 18.Kg2 Qf6 19.Bd5 Qxf2+ 20.Kh1 Qg1+ 21.Rxg1 Nf2+ 22.Kg2 Bh3# 0–1

=== The "Game of the Century" ===
Byrne vs. Fischer, 1956

Position: b8 white queen, f7 black pawn, g7 black king, c6 black pawn, g6 black pawn, b5 black pawn, e5 white knight, h5 black pawn, b4 black bishop, h4 white pawn, b3 black bishop, c3 black knight, c2 black rook, g2 white pawn, c1 white king

The final position, another pure mate won by Black

In 1956, Bobby Fischer, a 13-year-old boy and future world champion, won a famous game against the master player Donald Byrne, establishing himself as a skilled player. Following an early queen sacrifice, Fischer coordinated his pieces to win a rook, two bishops, and a pawn for the sacrificed queen, thus gaining a winning material advantage.

In professional chess, when a game is clearly lost, it is customary for the losing player to resign rather than play until checkmate, both out of respect for one's opponent and also to avoid the tedium of forcing the opponent to play until checkmate, which the winning player may view as poor sportsmanship. However, Byrne is supposed to have conferred with some of his fellow players, deciding to play until checkmate for the same reason that most players resign ahead of time: as a sign of respect for Fischer's skill and also to allow the young Fischer the satisfaction of mate. The final result was a pure mate, with a black rook, bishop and knight trapping the white king against the edge of the board.

=== The "Immortal Game" ===
Anderssen vs. Kieseritzky, 1851

Position: a8 black rook, c8 black bishop, d8 black king, h8 black rook, a7 black pawn, d7 black pawn, e7 white bishop, f7 black pawn, g7 white knight, h7 black pawn, a6 black knight, f6 black knight, b5 black pawn, d5 white knight, e5 white pawn, h5 white pawn, g4 white pawn, d3 white pawn, a2 white pawn, c2 white pawn, e2 white king, a1 black queen, g1 black bishop

Final position of a frequently reproduced continuation, after 23.Be7#. A model mate, with White the winner.

The Immortal Game was a casual game played by Adolf Anderssen and Lionel Kieseritzky in 1851. Anderssen allowed a double rook sacrifice in order to develop an attack using his remaining minor pieces. Hooper, Whyld and Kasparov report that Kieseritzky resigned the game following 20.Ke2. However, the continuation 20...Na6 21.Nxg7+ Kd8 22.Qf6+ Nxf6 23.Be7# is commonly reported in treatments of the game. If played, this continuation would have resulted in a model mate. Kasparov described the continuation as being both "pure" and "economic", two adjectives which, taken together, are synonymous with a model mate.

Objectively the game is rather weak and superficial, but what a finish! After sacrificing both rooks, a bishop and a queen, the mate was simultaneously pure, economic and smooth!

== Non-examples ==
Position: e7 white queen, c6 black pawn, d5 black king, f5 white rook, c4 black bishop, c3 white king

A composed non-example

Non-examples of pure mate have been composed. In the given non-example, the black king cannot move to either c5 or e5 for the same two reasons: these squares are attacked by both the white queen and the white rook. The black king also cannot move to c4 for two reasons: the square is occupied by a friendly bishop, but even if it weren't, it is also attacked by the white king.

== Exceptions for double check and pins ==
Some authors allow exceptional cases involving double check and pins to count as pure mates, even if they violate the basic concept that each square of the field (and the king's square itself) is covered exactly once. Such exceptions are allowed if the existence of a double check or a pin is necessary in order for the position to be a checkmate, preventing the mated party from responding to the check, which they might otherwise have done.

In chess composition, the aesthetic concept which allows for this expanded definition of pure mate is called economy of force. Economy of force refers to the idea that a chess composition is simpler and more beautiful when it uses minimal material to maximal effect, e.g. in a checkmate or some particular tactic. Ideally, in order to avoid redundancy, no more than one unit should attack a given square. But if the minimum force necessary in order to ensure checkmate requires a double check or a pin, then the resulting position may be regarded as a pure mate.

In the first diagrammed position, Black has been mated by a double check. Every square of the king's field is attacked, guarded, or blocked exactly once. However, the king's square itself is attacked twice. In a double check, it is impossible for a defender to block or capture both attackers simultaneously. Therefore the king must move, and in the given position, it cannot. If the position were not a double check, then the black queen would be able to deal with either check, either by interposing between the rook and the king at e5, between the bishop and the king at e4, or else by capturing the rook at f5. Double check prevents the queen from moving at all. The fact that the position is a double check is necessary in order for it to be a checkmate, and therefore some authors allow it as a pure mate. (Note: Other authors may allow such a position to count as a pure mate, for the simple reason that they do not consider the king's square itself in their definition.)

In the second diagrammed position, Black has been mated by the knight at e3. Every square in the king's field and the king's square itself are each covered exactly once, with one exception. The black king cannot move to e4 for two reasons: the square is occupied by a friendly rook, but even if it weren't, the square is also attacked by the white bishop, which pins the rook to its king. However, the fact that the rook is pinned is necessary in order for the position to be a checkmate. If the rook were not pinned, it would be able to deal with the check by capturing the knight at e3. Both of these examples satisfy Hooper and Whyld's expanded definition of pure mate.

Position: d6 black pawn, e6 black queen, d5 black king, f5 white rook, c3 white king, g2 white bishop

A position involving a double check may be regarded as pure mate, if the double check was necessary to ensure checkmate.

Position: d7 white king, d5 black king, e5 black pawn, e4 black rook, b3 white knight, e3 white knight, g2 white bishop

A position involving a friendly piece pinned in the mated king's field may be regarded as pure mate, if the pin is necessary to ensure checkmate.

=== Non-examples ===
In the first non-example shown, White can play 1.Re8#. If this move is played, Black will be mated by double check. The position might be a pure mate, except that a8 is attacked twice, by both the white rook and bishop. Even if the resulting position were not a double check, Black has no way of addressing either or both attacks. In other words, it was not necessary to play the double check in order to prevent Black from capturing an attacker or interposing into a line of attack. Therefore, the double check would represent additional and unnecessary attacking force, above the minimum required for mate and contrary to the concept of economy of force. Thus, the position following 1.Re8# fails to satisfy Hooper and Whyld's definition of a pure mate. White could instead play 1.Qc8#, a genuine pure mate delivered by an unassisted queen.

In the second non-example, White can play 1.Bd5#. If this move is played, Black will be mated in a position involving a pinned piece in the king's field. The position might be a pure mate, except that a7 is both occupied by a friendly pawn and also attacked by the white queen. The pin is unnecessary to the checkmate, because even if the pawn were not pinned, it would still not be able to capture the attacking bishop or to interpose in the bishop's line of attack. If, after 1.Bd5#, the white queen were removed from the board, the position would still be a checkmate. Therefore, the pin represents additional and unnecessary attacking force, above the minimum required for mate and contrary to the concept of economy of force. Thus, the position fails to satisfy Hooper and Whyld's definition of a pure mate. White could instead play 1.Qd5#, simultaneously unpinning the black pawn and delivering a genuine pure mate.

Non-example 1

Position: a8 black king, a7 black pawn, e4 white rook, f3 white bishop, f2 white king, c1 white queen

The position following 1.Re8# is not accepted as pure mate, because the double check involves superfluous attacking force. Instead, 1.Qc8# would be a pure mate.
Non-example 2

Position: a8 black king, b8 black bishop, a7 black pawn, f7 white bishop, a2 white queen, f2 white king

The position following 1.Bd5# is not accepted as pure mate, because there is no need to keep the pawn pinned to a7 in order to checkmate. Instead, 1.Qd5# unpins the pawn and delivers a pure mate.

== Bibliography ==
- Hooper, David; Whyld, Kenneth (1996) [first pub. 1992]. The Oxford Companion to Chess (second ed.). Oxford: Oxford University Press. ISBN 9780198661641.
- Horton, Byrne J. (1959). Dictionary of Modern Chess. Philosophical Library.
