= Opera Game =

Famous 1858 chess game played at an opera house in Paris

Animation of the Opera Game

The Opera Game was a chess game played in October or November 1858 at the Salle Ventadour in Paris. The American master Paul Morphy played against two amateurs: the German noble Karl II, Duke of Brunswick, and the French aristocrat Comte Isouard de Vauvenargues. It was played as a consultation game, with Duke Karl and Count Isouard jointly deciding each move for the black pieces, while Morphy controlled the white pieces by himself. The game was played in a box while an opera was performed on stage. Morphy quickly checkmated his opponents following rapid development and sacrifice of material, including a queen sacrifice.

It is among the most famous chess games. It is often used by chess instructors to teach the importance of piece development, the value of sacrifices in mating combinations, and other concepts.

== Circumstances ==
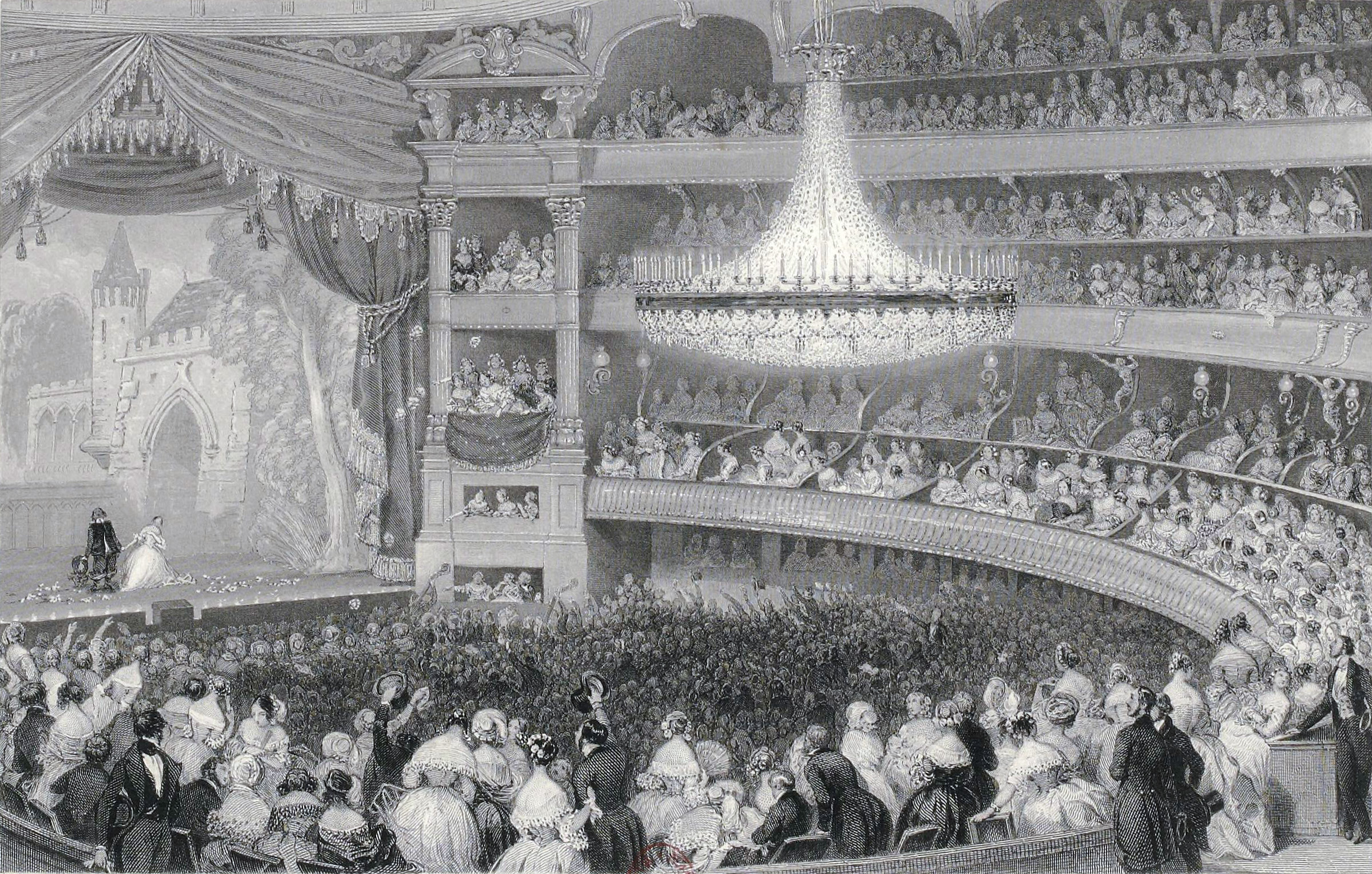
A performance by the Théâtre-Italien at the Salle Ventadour (c. 1842)

Frederick Milnes Edge recounted seeing Morphy play a game with the Duke and the Count in the Duke's opera box as follows:

H. R. H. the Duke of Brunswick is a thorough devotee to Caïssa; we never saw him but he was playing chess with some one or other. We were frequent visitors to his box at the Italian Opera; he had got a chess-board even there, and played throughout the performance. On our first visit “Norma” was performed. The Duke's box is right on the stage; so close, indeed, that you might kiss the prima donna without any trouble. Morphy sat with his back to the stage, and the Duke and Count Isouard facing him. Now it must not be supposed that he was comfortable. Decidedly otherwise; for I have already stated that he is passionately fond of music, and, under the circumstances, wished chess at Pluto. The game began and went on: his antagonists had heard Norma so often that they could, probably, sing it through without prompting; they did not even listen to most of it, but went on disputing with each other as to their next move. Then Madame Penco, who represented the Druidical priestess, kept looking towards the box, wondering what was the cause of the excitement inside; little dreaming that Caïssa was the only Casta Diva the inmates cared about. And those tremendous fellows, the “supes,” who “did” the Druids, how they marched down the stage, chaunting fire and bloodshed against the Roman host, who, they appeared to think, were inside the Duke's box.

The Duke of Brunswick's penchant for playing chess in his box is attested to by newspaper reports from November 1857, the year before he met Morphy, that he had caused a scandal at the Théâtre Italien by playing chess during a performance of La traviata and making so much noise that the director had to tell him to be quiet.

Johann Löwenthal, making no mention of this game's being played at an opera, places it among three games which "were played in the months of October and November, 1858, in Paris". Max Lange states that the Opera Game was played in October during a performance of The Barber of Seville. David Lawson says that this game was played during a performance of The Barber of Seville, and that Edge's anecdote refers to an earlier occasion when Morphy played the duo at a performance of Norma. Chess historian Edward Winter cites other authors who assert with no apparent contemporary source that the opera was La Cenerentola or The Marriage of Figaro.

Contemporary opera announcements in La presse record that there were performances of Norma at the Italiens on October 21, 23, 26, and 30, and performances of The Barber of Seville on November 4, 13, and 14; Lange's statements that the game was played in October and at a performance of The Barber of Seville are therefore irreconcilable.

George Frederick Pardon states that a different game of Morphy's against another opponent, Wincenty Budzyński, was played during a performance of The Barber of Seville.

== The game ==
White: Paul Morphy Black: Duke of Brunswick and Count Isouard Opening: Philidor Defence (ECO C41)
Paris, October/November 1858

1. e4 e5 2. Nf3 d6

This is Philidor's Defence, named after François-André Danican Philidor, the leading chess master of the second half of the 18th century and a pioneer of modern chess strategy. He was also a noted opera composer. It is a solid opening, but slightly passive, and it ignores the important d4-square. Most modern players prefer 2...Nc6 or 2...Nf6, Petrov's Defence.

3. d4 Bg4?

3...Bg4 has long been considered inferior. Bobby Fischer, in his analysis of the game, called it a weak move. Today 3...exd4 or 3...Nf6 are more commonly played. 3...Nd7, the Hanham Variation, intends to establish a solid position with a strongpoint on e5, although White can cause Black difficulties with 4.Bc4 c6 5.0-0 Be7 6.dxe5 dxe5 7.Ng5!. Philidor's original idea, 3...f5, is a risky alternative.

4. dxe5 Bxf3

If 4...dxe5, then 5.Qxd8+ Kxd8 6.Nxe5 and White wins a pawn and Black has lost the ability to castle, and White is threatening Nxf7+ winning the rook. If 4...Qe7, White remains a pawn up with 5.Qd5. Black, however, did have the option of 4...Nd7 5.exd6 Bxd6. In this position, Black is down a pawn but has some compensation in the form of better development.

5. Qxf3

Steinitz's recommendation 5.gxf3 dxe5 6.Qxd8+ Kxd8 7.f4 is also good; Maróczy, however, gives White the upper hand in the endgame. Morphy prefers to keep the queens on. After Black recaptures the pawn on e5, White has a significant lead in development. A recapture with the queen is the most natural as it keeps a healthy kingside pawn structure.

5... dxe5 6. Bc4 Nf6?

Steinitz remarks that 3...Bg4 was not good, "and this is worse." This seemingly sound developing move runs into a surprising refutation. After White's next move, both f7 and b7 will be under attack. Better would have been to directly protect the f7-pawn with 6...Qf6 or 6...Qd7!? (Maróczy), making White's next move less potent.

Position: a8 black rook, b8 black knight, e8 black king, f8 black bishop, h8 black rook, a7 black pawn, b7 black pawn, c7 black pawn, e7 black queen, f7 black pawn, g7 black pawn, h7 black pawn, f6 black knight, e5 black pawn, c4 white bishop, e4 white pawn, b3 white queen, a2 white pawn, b2 white pawn, c2 white pawn, f2 white pawn, g2 white pawn, h2 white pawn, a1 white rook, b1 white knight, c1 white bishop, e1 white king, h1 white rook

Position after 7...Qe7

7. Qb3 Qe7 (diagram)

Black's only reasonable move. White was threatening mate in two, for example, 7...Nc6 8.Bxf7+ Ke7 (or Kd7) 9.Qe6#. 7...Qd7 loses the rook to 8.Qxb7 followed by 9.Qxa8 (since 8...Qc6? would lose the queen to 9.Bb5).
Although this move prevents immediate disaster, Black blocks the f8-bishop, impeding development and kingside castling.

8. Nc3

Morphy could have won a pawn by 8.Qxb7 Qb4+ 9.Qxb4 Bxb4+. White can also win more material with 8.Bxf7+ Qxf7 9.Qxb7, but Black has dangerous counterplay after 9...Bc5! and 10.Qxa8 0-0, or 10.Qc8+ Ke7 11.Qxh8 Bxf2+!. "But that would have been a butcher's method, not an artist's." (Lasker). In keeping with his style, Morphy prefers rapid development and initiative over material.

8... c6

The best move, allowing Black to defend his pawn while strengthening the light squares, which have already been weakened by Black trading off his light-square bishop.

9. Bg5 b5?

Black attempts to drive away the bishop and gain some time, but this move allows Morphy a strong sacrifice to keep the initiative. This move loses but it is difficult to find anything better; for example 9...Na6 10.Bxf6 gxf6 11.Bxa6 bxa6 12.Qa4 Qb7 and Black's position is very weak.

10. Nxb5!

Morphy chooses not to retreat the bishop, which would allow Black to gain time for development. Steinitz called this "the first link in the chain of a most beautiful combination." Löwenthal said that this move and those that follow "display a depth and accuracy to which too high praise cannot be awarded."

10... cxb5

Black could have prolonged the game by playing 10...Qb4+, forcing the exchange of queens, but White wins comfortably after either 11.Nc3 or 11.Qxb4 Bxb4+ 12.c3!

11. Bxb5+

Not 11.Bd5? Qb4+, unpinning the knight and allowing the rook to evade capture.

11... Nbd7

11...Kd8 holds out longer, but 12.0-0-0+ still gives White a winning attack.

Position: d8 black rook, e8 black king, f8 black bishop, h8 black rook, a7 black pawn, d7 black knight, e7 black queen, f7 black pawn, g7 black pawn, h7 black pawn, f6 black knight, b5 white bishop, e5 black pawn, g5 white bishop, e4 white pawn, b3 white queen, a2 white pawn, b2 white pawn, c2 white pawn, f2 white pawn, g2 white pawn, h2 white pawn, c1 white king, d1 white rook, h1 white rook

Position after 12...Rd8

12. 0-0-0 Rd8 (diagram)

The combination of the pins on the knights and the open file for White's rook will lead to Black's defeat. If 12...0-0-0, 13.Ba6+ Kc7 14.Qb7#.

13. Rxd7 Rxd7

Removing another defender. Steinitz calls Morphy's move as "all powerful and exact."

14. Rd1

White's piece activity is in marked contrast to Black's passivity. Black's d7-rook cannot be saved, since it is pinned to the king by the bishop and attacked by the rook, and though the knight defends it, the knight is pinned to the queen.

14... Qe6

Qe6 is a futile attempt to unpin the knight (allowing it to defend the rook) and offer a queen trade, to take some pressure out of the white attack. Even if Morphy did not play his next crushing move, he could have always traded his bishop for the knight, followed by winning the rook.

15. Bxd7+ Nxd7

If 15...Qxd7, then 16.Qb8+ Ke7 17.Qxe5+ Kd8 18.Bxf6+ gxf6 19.Qxf6+ Kc8 20.Rxd7 Kxd7 21.Qxh8 and White is clearly winning. Moving the king leads to mate: 15...Ke7 16.Qb4+ Qd6 (16...Kd8 17.Qb8+ Ke7 18.Qe8#) 17.Qxd6+ Kd8 18.Qb8+ Ke7 19.Qe8# or 15...Kd8 16.Qb8+ Ke7 17.Qe8#.

16. Qb8+!

Morphy finishes with a queen sacrifice. "A sparkling finish." (Tartakower)

16... Nxb8 17. Rd8# 1–0

Steinitz praises this "very fine finish to a most elegant game." Sergeant remarks, "No doubt the opposition was weak; but Morphy's method of overcoming it was most beautifully logical—a Damascus blade cutting a silk cushion."

Position: b8 black knight, d8 white rook, e8 black king, f8 black bishop, h8 black rook, a7 black pawn, f7 black pawn, g7 black pawn, h7 black pawn, e6 black queen, e5 black pawn, g5 white bishop, e4 white pawn, a2 white pawn, b2 white pawn, c2 white pawn, f2 white pawn, g2 white pawn, h2 white pawn, c1 white king

Final position after 17.Rd8#. White mates with his two remaining pieces.

This mating pattern is sometimes called the "opera mate" in reference to this game. Other than the king, all of White's remaining pieces play a role in the checkmate. Therefore, the position satisfies the definition of an economical mate. Economical mate is one of a few terms used by chess problem composers to describe the aesthetic properties of a checkmate position; related concepts include pure mate, model mate, and ideal mate. The final position nearly satisfies the criteria of a model mate, but fails on one condition: there are two reasons why the black king cannot be moved to the square f8. It is occupied by a bishop of the same colour, and it is guarded by the white rook.

Tommaso Cambray-Digny celebrated this game in a poem titled "Scacchi e Musica."
