= Traxler =

Traxler may refer to:

== People ==
- Brian Traxler (1967–2004), American baseball player
- J. Bob Traxler (1931-2019), American politician
- Jiří Traxler (1912–2011), Czech-Canadian jazz and swing pianist, composer, lyricist and arranger
- Karel Traxler (1866–1936), Czech chess player chess-composer and Roman Catholic priest
- Margaret Traxler (1924–2002), American Roman Catholic nun and women's rights activist
- William Byrd Traxler, Jr. (born 1948), circuit judge and former Chief Judge of the U.S. Court of Appeals for the Fourth Circuit

== Places ==
=== United States ===
- Traxler, Florida, a ghost town
- Thaxler, Mississippi, an unincorporated community

== Other ==
- The Traxler Variation, a chess opening
