= Game of the Century (chess) =

1956 chess game

The Game of the Century is a chess game that was won by the 13-year-old future world champion Bobby Fischer against Donald Byrne in the Rosenwald Memorial Tournament at the Marshall Chess Club in New York City on October 17, 1956. In Chess Review, Hans Kmoch dubbed it "The Game of the Century" and wrote: "The following game, a stunning masterpiece of combination play performed by a boy of 13 against a formidable opponent, matches the finest on record in the history of chess prodigies."

== Background ==
Donald Byrne (1930–1976) was one of the leading American chess masters at the time of this game. He won the 1953 U.S. Open Championship, and represented the United States in the 1962, 1964, and 1968 Chess Olympiads. He became an International Master in 1962, and probably would have risen further if not for ill health. Bobby Fischer (1943–2008) was at this time a promising junior facing one of his first real tests against master-level opposition. His overall performance in the tournament was mediocre, but he soon had a meteoric rise, winning the 1957 U.S. Open on tiebreaks, winning the 1957–58 U.S. (Closed) Championship (and all seven later championships in which he played), qualifying for the Candidates Tournament and becoming in 1958 the world's youngest Grandmaster at age 15. He won the world championship in 1972, and is considered one of the greatest chess players of all time.

In this game, Fischer (playing Black) demonstrates noteworthy innovation and improvisation. Byrne (playing White), after a standard opening, makes a seemingly minor mistake on move 11, losing a tempo by moving the same piece twice. Fischer pounces with brilliant sacrificial play, culminating in a queen sacrifice on move 17. Byrne captures the queen, but Fischer gets copious material for it – a rook, two bishops, and a pawn. At the end, Fischer's pieces coordinate to force checkmate, while Byrne's queen sits useless on the other side of the board.

== The game ==
White: Donald Byrne Black: Bobby Fischer Opening: Grünfeld Defense (ECO D92)

1. Nf3

A noncommittal move by Byrne. From here, the game can develop into a number of different openings.

1... Nf6 2. c4 g6 3. Nc3 Bg7

Fischer defends based on "hypermodern" principles, inviting Byrne to establish a classical pawn stronghold in the center, which Fischer intends to target and undermine with his fianchettoed bishop and other pieces.

4. d4 0-0

Fischer castles, bringing his king to safety. The Black move 4...d5 would have reached the Grünfeld Defense immediately. After Fischer's 4...0-0, Byrne could have played 5.e4, whereupon 5...d6 6.Be2 e5 reaches the main line of the King's Indian Defense.

Position: a8 black rook, b8 black knight, c8 black bishop, d8 black queen, f8 black rook, g8 black king, a7 black pawn, b7 black pawn, c7 black pawn, e7 black pawn, f7 black pawn, g7 black bishop, h7 black pawn, f6 black knight, g6 black pawn, d5 black pawn, c4 white pawn, d4 white pawn, f4 white bishop, c3 white knight, f3 white knight, a2 white pawn, b2 white pawn, e2 white pawn, f2 white pawn, g2 white pawn, h2 white pawn, a1 white rook, d1 white queen, e1 white king, f1 white bishop, h1 white rook

Position after 5...d5

5. Bf4 d5 (diagram)

The game has now transposed to the Grünfeld Defense (5...d5, ECO code D92), in a line with Bf4. The Grünfeld is usually initiated by 1.d4 Nf6 2.c4 g6 3.Nc3 d5.

6. Qb3

A form of the so-called Russian System (the usual move order is 1.d4 Nf6 2.c4 g6 3.Nc3 d5 4.Nf3 Bg7 5.Qb3), putting pressure on Fischer's central d5-pawn. Garry Kasparov points out that 6.Rc1 or 6.e3 both have extensive theory behind them, and that 6.cxd5 Nxd5 7.Nxd5 Qxd5 8.Bxc7 favors Black.

6... dxc4

Fischer relinquishes his center, but draws Byrne's queen to a square where it is exposed and can be attacked.

7. Qxc4 c6 8. e4 Nbd7

In later games, Black played the more active 8...b5 followed by 9...Qa5. An example is Bisguier–Benko, U.S. Championship 1963–64. Fischer's choice is a little slow, although one would not guess that from the subsequent play. Another possible move for Black is 8...Qa5, Boleslavsky's move.

9. Rd1 Nb6 10. Qc5

An awkward square for the queen, which leaves it exposed to a possible ...Na4 or ...Ne4, as Fischer demonstrates. Since both those squares are protected by Byrne's knight on c3, he understandably did not appreciate the danger. 10.Qd3 would have left the queen better placed.

10... Bg4

Byrne's pawns control the center squares, but Fischer is ahead in development and has castled, while Byrne's king is still in the center. These factors would not have been very significant had Byrne attended to his development on his next move.

Position: a8 black rook, d8 black queen, f8 black rook, g8 black king, a7 black pawn, b7 black pawn, e7 black pawn, f7 black pawn, g7 black bishop, h7 black pawn, b6 black knight, c6 black pawn, f6 black knight, g6 black pawn, c5 white queen, g5 white bishop, d4 white pawn, e4 white pawn, g4 black bishop, c3 white knight, f3 white knight, a2 white pawn, b2 white pawn, f2 white pawn, g2 white pawn, h2 white pawn, d1 white rook, e1 white king, f1 white bishop, h1 white rook

Position after 11.Bg5

11. Bg5? (diagram)

Intended to prevent 11...Nfd7 followed by ...e5, but Byrne errs by not completing his development. Numerous authors suggest 11.Be2 instead, protecting the king and preparing kingside castling. Flear–Morris, Dublin 1991, continued 11.Be2 Nfd7 12.Qa3 Bxf3 13.Bxf3 e5 14.dxe5 Qe8 15.Be2 Nxe5 16.0-0 and White was slightly better.

11... Na4!!

When this move was made, a number of people went over to the table to start watching the game.

"One of the most powerful moves of all time." (Jonathan Rowson). Fischer offers a knight sacrifice. If Byrne plays 12.Nxa4, Fischer will reply 12...Nxe4, leaving Byrne with some terrible choices:
- 13.Qxe7 Qa5+ 14.b4 Qxa4 15.Qxe4 Rfe8 16.Be7 Bxf3 17.gxf3 Bf8 produces a deadly pin;
- 13.Bxe7 Nxc5 14.Bxd8 Nxa4 15.Bg5 Bxf3 16.gxf3 Nxb2 gives Fischer an extra pawn and ruins Byrne's pawn structure;
- 13.Qc1 Qa5+ 14.Nc3 Bxf3 15.gxf3 Nxg5 regains the sacrificed piece with a better position and extra pawn;
- 13.Qb4 Nxg5 14.Nxg5 Bxd1 15.Kxd1 Bxd4 16.Qd2 Bxf2 with a winning material advantage.

12. Qa3 Nxc3 13. bxc3 Nxe4!

Fischer again offers material in order to open the e-file and get at White's uncastled king.

14. Bxe7 Qb6 15. Bc4

Byrne wisely declines the offered material. If 15.Bxf8 Bxf8 16.Qb3, we have 16...Nxc3! 17.Qxb6 (17.Qxc3?? Bb4 wins the queen) axb6 18.Ra1 Bxf3 (Fischer's 1959 analysis gives instead 18...Re8+ 19.Kd2 Ne4+ 20.Kc2 Nxf2 21.Rg1 Bf5+ and winning) 19.gxf3 Ba3 20.Kd2 Bb2 21.Re1 Nd5 and Black is winning.

15... Nxc3!

If 16.Qxc3, then 16...Rfe8 17.Qe3 Bxf3! (and not 17...Qc7 because of 18.Bxf7+!) 18.gxf3 Qc7; if 16.Bxf8, then 16...Bxf8 17.Qxc3 Bb4.

Position: a8 black rook, e8 black rook, g8 black king, a7 black pawn, b7 black pawn, f7 black pawn, g7 black bishop, h7 black pawn, b6 black queen, c6 black pawn, g6 black pawn, c5 white bishop, c4 white bishop, d4 white pawn, g4 black bishop, a3 white queen, c3 black knight, f3 white knight, a2 white pawn, f2 white pawn, g2 white pawn, h2 white pawn, d1 white rook, f1 white king, h1 white rook

Position after 17.Kf1. Instead of protecting his queen, Fischer launches a stunning counterattack with 17...Be6!!

16. Bc5 Rfe8+ 17. Kf1 (see diagram)

Byrne threatens Fischer's queen; Fischer brings his rook into play, displacing Byrne's king. It appears that Fischer must solve his problems with his queen, whereupon White can play 18.Qxc3, with a winning material advantage. Jack Straley Battell writes that the masters observing the game considered Black's position lost.

17... Be6!!

This is the move that made this game famous. Instead of saving his queen, Fischer offers to sacrifice it. Fischer pointed out that 17...Nb5? loses to 18.Bxf7+ Kxf7 19.Qb3+ Be6 20.Ng5+ Kg8 21.Nxe6 Nxd4 22.Nxd4+ Qxb3 23.Nxb3.

Position: a8 black rook, e8 black rook, g8 black king, a7 black pawn, b7 black pawn, f7 black pawn, g7 black bishop, h7 black pawn, b6 white bishop, c6 black pawn, e6 black bishop, g6 black pawn, c4 white bishop, d4 white pawn, a3 white queen, c3 black knight, f3 white knight, a2 white pawn, f2 white pawn, g2 white pawn, h2 white pawn, d1 white rook, f1 white king, h1 white rook

Position after 18.Bxb6

18. Bxb6? (diagram)

Byrne takes the offered queen, hoping to outplay his 13-year-old opponent in the ensuing complications, but Fischer gets far too much for it, leaving Byrne with a hopeless game. 18.Bxe6? would have been even worse, leading to a smothered mate with 18...Qb5+ 19.Kg1 Ne2+ 20.Kf1 Ng3+ 21.Kg1 Qf1+! 22.Rxf1 Ne2#. 18.Qxc3 would have been met by 18...Qxc5! and if 19.dxc5, 19...Bxc3 and Black should win the endgame. White's best chance may have been 18.Bd3 Nb5!, which Kmoch wrote would also result in "a win for Black in the long run".

18... Bxc4+

Fischer now begins a 'windmill' series of discovered checks, picking up material.

19. Kg1 Ne2+ 20. Kf1 Nxd4+ 21. Kg1

21.Rd3? axb6 22.Qc3 Nxf3 23.Qxc4 Re1#

21... Ne2+ 22. Kf1 Nc3+ 23. Kg1 axb6

Fischer captures a piece, simultaneously revealing a discovered attack against Byrne's queen.

24. Qb4 Ra4!

Fischer was now sitting very calmly and making moves at a steady pace. His pieces cooperate nicely: the bishop on g7 protects the knight on c3, which protects the rook on a4, which in turn protects the bishop on c4 and forces Byrne's queen away. 24...Nxd1? 25.Qxc4 is much less clear.

25. Qxb6

Trying to protect his rook with 25.Qd6 loses the queen to 25...Nxd1 26.Qxd1 Rxa2 threatening 27...Ra1.

Position: e8 black rook, g8 black king, b7 black pawn, f7 black pawn, g7 black bishop, h7 black pawn, b6 white queen, c6 black pawn, g6 black pawn, a4 black rook, c4 black bishop, f3 white knight, a2 white pawn, f2 white pawn, g2 white pawn, h2 white pawn, d1 black knight, g1 white king, h1 white rook

Position after 25...Nxd1. Fischer has more than enough material for his sacrificed queen.

25... Nxd1 (see diagram)

Fischer has gained a rook, two bishops, and a pawn for his sacrificed queen, leaving him ahead the equivalent, roughly, of one minor piece – an easily winning advantage in master play. White's queen is far outmatched by Black's pieces, which dominate the board and will soon overrun White's position. Moreover, Byrne's remaining rook is stuck on h1 and it will take precious time (and the loss of the pawn on f2) to free it. Byrne could have resigned here, but chose to play on until checkmate, as a courtesy to Fischer's skill.

26. h3 Rxa2 27. Kh2 Nxf2 28. Re1 Rxe1 29. Qd8+ Bf8 30. Nxe1 Bd5 31. Nf3 Ne4 32. Qb8 b5

Every piece and pawn of Black's is defended, leaving White's queen with nothing to do.

33. h4 h5 34. Ne5 Kg7

Fischer breaks the pin, allowing the bishop to attack as well.

Position: b8 white queen, f7 black pawn, g7 black king, c6 black pawn, g6 black pawn, b5 black pawn, c5 black bishop, d5 black bishop, e5 white knight, h5 black pawn, e4 black knight, h4 white pawn, a2 black rook, g2 white pawn, g1 white king

Position after 35...Bc5+. Mate is inevitable.

35. Kg1 Bc5+ (see diagram)

Now Fischer uses his pieces in concert to force mate.

36. Kf1 Ng3+ 37. Ke1 Bb4+

Kmoch notes that with 37...Re2+ Fischer could have mated a move sooner.

38. Kd1 Bb3+ 39. Kc1 Ne2+ 40. Kb1 Nc3+ 41. Kc1 Rc2# 0–1

Position: b8 white queen, f7 black pawn, g7 black king, c6 black pawn, g6 black pawn, b5 black pawn, e5 white knight, h5 black pawn, b4 black bishop, h4 white pawn, b3 black bishop, c3 black knight, c2 black rook, g2 white pawn, c1 white king

Final position after 41...Rc2# (a pure mate)

Asked how he was able to pull off such a brilliant win, Fischer said: "I just made the moves I thought were best. I was just lucky."

== See also ==
- Immortal Game
- List of books and documentaries by or about Bobby Fischer
- List of chess games
