= Peruvian Immortal =

Famous chess game

The Peruvian Immortal is the name given to a chess game played by the Peruvian master (later grandmaster) Esteban Canal against an unknown amateur (his surname is given as Horvath on Chessgames.com) in a simultaneous exhibition he gave at Budapest in 1934. In just 14 moves, Canal sacrificed both his rooks and his queen, finishing with Boden's mate.

Julius du Mont calls it, "A charming game." Irving Chernev writes, "In 13 moves, Canal sacrifices both Rooks and his Queen—and then mates on his 14th move! ... A man might play a million games of chess and never duplicate Canal's feat." Fred Reinfeld writes,

When Anderssen sacrificed two Rooks, the Queen etc. against Kieseritzky, the finished product was described as 'the immortal game'. It might be more accurate to call it 'an immortal game', for since that time there have been many claimants to the title. Not the least deserving is [this] little gem, on which Canal may have lavished something less than five minutes. The game has the blazing quality of a Liszt improvisation.

== The game ==
White: Esteban Canal Black: NN Opening: Scandinavian Defense (ECO B01)
Budapest 1934

Position: c8 black king, d8 black rook, g8 black knight, h8 black rook, a7 black pawn, b7 black pawn, d7 black knight, f7 black pawn, g7 black pawn, h7 black pawn, c6 black pawn, e6 black pawn, a5 black queen, b4 black bishop, d4 white pawn, f4 white bishop, a3 white pawn, c3 white knight, f3 white queen, h3 white pawn, b2 white pawn, c2 white pawn, e2 white bishop, f2 white pawn, g2 white pawn, a1 white rook, e1 white king, h1 white rook

Position after 10...0-0-0??

1. e4 d5 2. exd5 Qxd5 3. Nc3 Qa5 4. d4 c6 5. Nf3 Bg4 6. Bf4 e6 7. h3 Bxf3 8. Qxf3 Bb4 9. Be2 Nd7 10. a3 0-0-0?? (diagram)

Incredibly, castling queenside turns out to be a blunder which at the least loses a piece. In another book, Reinfeld writes, "Black mistakenly thinks that [11.axb4] is out of the question. But White, seeing further ahead and relying on his excellent attacking position, has a stunning surprise continuation." Iakov Neishtadt writes, "Black is convinced that his opponent cannot take the Bishop. This would indeed have been the case if he had played not 10...0-0-0, but 10...Ngf6." Seirawan and Minev advise, "Motto: Think twice before castling on the Queenside!"

11. axb4!!

If a6, b7, and c6 are unprotected by black pieces, then Boden's mate would be possible, so White starts to deflect the black queen from guarding these squares by force.

11... Qxa1+

If Black plays 11...Qb6 in order to protect a6, b7, and c6, then (besides already being a piece up) White could continue to attack the black queen with 12.Na4.

12. Kd2!

Another deflection. Black is doomed now, for after capturing the white rook at a1, Black loses the last chance to protect c6, and the black queen is unable to stay on the a-file to protect a6.

12... Qxh1

Reinfeld writes, "Microscopically preferable was 12...Ne5 13.Bxe5 Qxh1 14.Qxf7 Rd7 (amusing would be 14...Ne7 15.Qxe6+! Rd7 16.Bg4 Rhd8 17.Qd6! forcing mate) 15.Qe8+ Rd8 16.Qxe6+ Rd7 17.Qe8+ Rd8 18.Bg4#!"

13. Qxc6+! bxc6 14. Ba6# 1–0

Position: c8 black king, d8 black rook, g8 black knight, h8 black rook, a7 black pawn, d7 black knight, f7 black pawn, g7 black pawn, h7 black pawn, a6 white bishop, c6 black pawn, e6 black pawn, b4 white pawn, d4 white pawn, f4 white bishop, c3 white knight, h3 white pawn, b2 white pawn, c2 white pawn, d2 white king, f2 white pawn, g2 white pawn, h1 black queen

Final position after 14.Ba6# (a pure mate)

== See also ==
- List of chess games
