= Immortal Game =

Chess game played in London in 1851

Immortal Game animation. Anderssen shown playing as White.

The Immortal Game was a chess game played in 1851 between Adolf Anderssen and Lionel Kieseritzky during the London 1851 chess tournament, an event in which both players participated. It was itself a casual game, however, not played as part of the tournament. Anderssen won the game by sacrificing all of his major pieces while developing a mating attack with his remaining minor pieces. Despite losing the game, Kieseritzky was impressed with Anderssen's performance. Kieseritzky published the game shortly afterwards in La Régence, a French chess journal which he helped to edit. Ernst Falkbeer published an analysis of the game in 1855, describing it for the first time with its sobriquet "immortal".

The Immortal Game is among the most famous chess games ever played. As a miniature game, it is frequently reproduced in chess literature to teach simple themes of gameplay. Although Kieseritzsky himself indicated that the game ended before checkmate, the Immortal Game is frequently reproduced with a brief continuation involving a queen sacrifice—a further loss of material—leading to checkmate. This continuation is commonly presented as part of the complete game, as if the final moves were actually played as part of the real historical game. Some authors also permute certain moves, deviating from Kieseritzky's report, although such permutations typically transpose to distinct lines of play that eventually return to the moves and positions reported by Kieseritzky.

Although both players made moves that are regarded as unsound by modern players, the game is appreciated as an example of the Romantic school of chess, a style of play that prized bold attacks and sacrifices over deep strategy. The game—especially its mating continuation—is also appreciated for its aesthetic value, as a plausible example of how a player with a significant material deficit but having an advantageous position can give mate. The continuation's mating position is a model mate, a strong form of pure mate (i.e. all of the attacker's remaining pieces contribute to the checkmate, while the mated king is prevented from moving to any other square for exactly one reason per square). In 1996, Bill Hartston called the game an achievement "perhaps unparalleled in chess literature".

== Overview ==
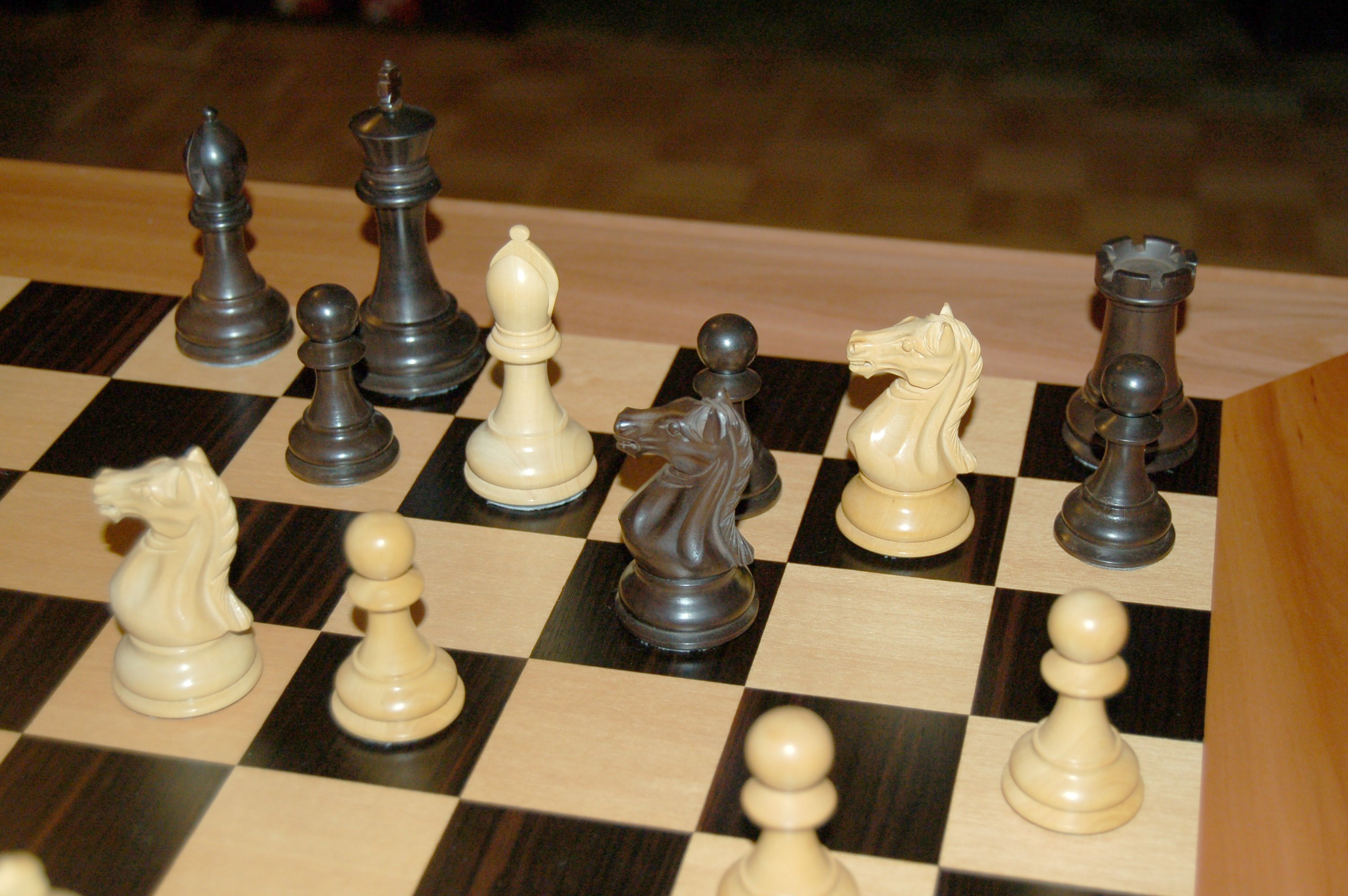
Immortal Game checkmate

Anderssen was one of the strongest players of his time, and many consider him to have been the world's strongest player after his victory in the London 1851 chess tournament. Kieseritzky lived in France much of his life, where he gave chess lessons and played games for five francs an hour at the Café de la Régence in Paris. His strength was shown most favorably when giving substantial odds to weak players; against masters, he was less convincing.

The Immortal Game was an informal one, played during a break in a formal tournament in London; the exact venue is uncertain. Kieseritzky was very impressed with Anderssen's performance; after the game was over, Kieseritzky telegraphed the moves of the game to his Parisian chess club. The French chess magazine La Régence published the game in July 1851. The Austrian Ernst Falkbeer nicknamed it "The Immortal Game" in 1855.

This game is acclaimed as an exemplar of the 19th-century Romantic style of chess, where rapid development and attack were considered the most effective way to win, many gambits and countergambits were offered (and not accepting them would be considered slightly ungentlemanly), and material was often held in contempt. These games, with their rapid attacks and counterattacks, are often entertaining to review, even if some of the moves are no longer considered optimal.

In this game, Anderssen won despite sacrificing a bishop (on move 11), both rooks (starting on move 18), and the queen (on move 22) to produce checkmate against Kieseritzky, who lost only three pawns. Anderssen later demonstrated the same kind of approach in the Evergreen Game.

Some published versions of the game have errors, as described in the annotations below.

== Publication ==
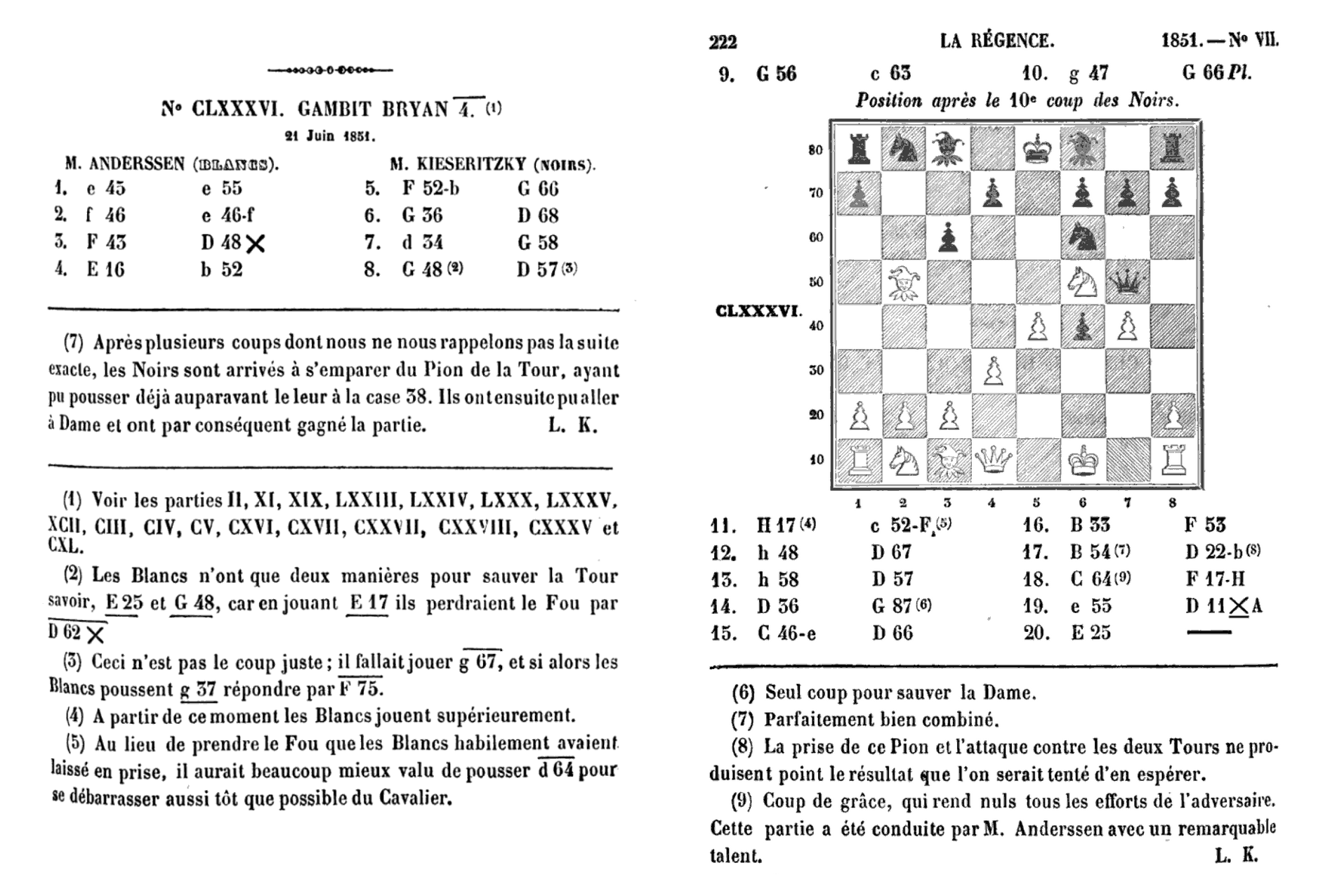
Record of the game, as communicated by Kieseritzky

Shortly after the game was played, Kieseritzky is believed to have telegraphed a report of the game to La Régence, a French chess journal which he helped to edit. The game was reported in an 1851 issue of the journal, with the piece attributed to Kieseritzky himself. La Régence used an "obscure" and prototypical form of algebraic notation to record chess games. Pawns were denoted using lowercase letters indicating their starting files (a–h), while pieces were denoted using uppercase letters (A–H) based on the file the piece started on (so rooks are A or H, knights are B or G, bishops are C or F, the queen is D, and the king is E). Squares were described beginning with their rank, then file, e.g. the square "e4" was instead described as "45".

The game has been republished many times, often with inconsistencies about the order of moves.

== Annotated game ==
White: Adolf Anderssen (Note: Among the historical sources, there is some confusion as to who used the white pieces, and who used the black pieces. The convention in chess that the player controlling the white pieces always moves first was not firmly established until the late 19th century. This article follows Kieseritzky's original account of the game, which agrees with the modern convention in chess: The player who moved first—Anderssen—used the white pieces, while Kieseritzky used the black pieces.) Black: Lionel Kieseritzky Opening: King's Gambit Accepted: Bishop's Gambit, Bryan Countergambit (ECO C33)

1. e4 e5 2. f4

This is the King's Gambit: Anderssen offers his pawn in exchange for faster development. This was one of the most popular openings of the 19th century and is still occasionally seen, though defensive techniques have improved since Anderssen's time.

2... exf4 3. Bc4

The Bishop's Gambit; this line allows 3...Qh4+, depriving White of the right to castle, and is less popular than 3.Nf3. This check, however, also exposes Black's queen to attack with a gain of tempo on the eventual Ng1–f3.

Position: a8 black rook, b8 black knight, c8 black bishop, e8 black king, f8 black bishop, g8 black knight, h8 black rook, a7 black pawn, c7 black pawn, d7 black pawn, f7 black pawn, g7 black pawn, h7 black pawn, b5 black pawn, c4 white bishop, e4 white pawn, f4 black pawn, h4 black queen, a2 white pawn, b2 white pawn, c2 white pawn, d2 white pawn, g2 white pawn, h2 white pawn, a1 white rook, b1 white knight, c1 white bishop, d1 white queen, f1 white king, g1 white knight, h1 white rook

Position after 4...b5

3... Qh4+ 4. Kf1 b5?! (diagram)

This is the Bryan Countergambit, deeply analysed by Kieseritzky, and which sometimes bears his name. It is not considered a sound move by most players today.

5. Bxb5 Nf6 6. Nf3

This is a common developing move, but in addition the knight attacks Black's queen, forcing Black to move it instead of developing his other pieces.

6... Qh6 7. d3

With this move, White solidifies control of the critical center of the board. German grandmaster Robert Hübner recommends 7.Nc3 instead.

7... Nh5

This move threatens ...Ng3+, and protects the pawn on f4, but also sidelines the knight to a poor position at the edge of the board, where knights are the least powerful, and does not develop a new piece.

8. Nh4 Qg5

Better was 8...g6, according to Kieseritzky.

9. Nf5 c6

This simultaneously unpins the queen pawn and attacks the bishop. Modern chess engines suggest 9...g6 would be better, to deal with a very troublesome knight.

Position: a8 black rook, b8 black knight, c8 black bishop, e8 black king, f8 black bishop, h8 black rook, a7 black pawn, d7 black pawn, f7 black pawn, g7 black pawn, h7 black pawn, c6 black pawn, f6 black knight, b5 white bishop, f5 white knight, g5 black queen, e4 white pawn, f4 black pawn, g4 white pawn, d3 white pawn, a2 white pawn, b2 white pawn, c2 white pawn, h2 white pawn, a1 white rook, b1 white knight, c1 white bishop, d1 white queen, f1 white king, g1 white rook

Position after 11.Rg1

10. g4? Nf6 11. Rg1! (diagram)

This is an advantageous passive piece sacrifice. If Black accepts, his queen will be boxed in, giving White a lead in development.

11... cxb5?

Hübner believes this was Black's critical mistake; this gains material but lacks in development, at a point where White's strong development is able to quickly mount an offensive. Hübner recommends 11...h5 instead.

12. h4!

White's knight at f5 protects the pawn, which attacks Black's queen.

12... Qg6 13. h5 Qg5 14. Qf3

White now has two threats:
- Bxf4, trapping Black's queen (the queen having no safe place to go);
- e5, attacking Black's knight at f6 while simultaneously exposing an attack by White's queen on the unprotected black rook on a8.

14... Ng8

This deals with the threats, but undevelops Black even further—now the only black piece not on its starting square is the queen, which is about to be put on the run, while White has control over a great deal of the board.

15. Bxf4 Qf6 16. Nc3 Bc5

An ordinary developing move by Black, which also attacks the rook at g1.

17. Nd5

White responds to the attack with a counterattack. This move threatens the black queen and also Nc7+, forking the king and rook. Richard Réti recommends 17.d4 followed by 18.Nd5, with advantage to White, although if 17.d4 Bf8 then 18.Be5 would be a stronger move.

Position: a8 black rook, b8 black knight, c8 black bishop, e8 black king, g8 black knight, h8 black rook, a7 black pawn, d7 black pawn, f7 black pawn, g7 black pawn, h7 black pawn, b5 black pawn, c5 black bishop, d5 white knight, f5 white knight, h5 white pawn, e4 white pawn, f4 white bishop, g4 white pawn, d3 white pawn, f3 white queen, a2 white pawn, b2 black queen, c2 white pawn, a1 white rook, f1 white king, g1 white rook

Position after 17...Qxb2

17... Qxb2 (diagram)

Black gains a pawn, and threatens to gain the rook on a1 with check.

18. Bd6!

With this move White offers to sacrifice both of his rooks. Hübner comments that, from this position, there are actually many ways to win, and he believes there are at least three better moves than 18.Bd6: 18.d4, 18.Be3, or 18.Re1, which lead to strong positions or checkmate without needing to sacrifice so much material. The Chessmaster computer program annotation says "the main point [of 18. Bd6] is to divert the black queen from the a1–h8 diagonal. Now Black cannot play 18...Bxd6? 19.Nxd6+ Kd8 20.Nxf7+ Ke8 21.Nd6+ Kd8 22.Qf8#." Garry Kasparov comments that the world of chess would have lost one of its "crown jewels" if the game had continued in such an unspectacular fashion. 18. Bd6! is surprising, because White is willing to give up so much material.

18... Bxg1?

Wilhelm Steinitz suggested in 1879 that a better move would be 18...Qxa1+; likely moves to follow are 19.Ke2 Qb2 20.Kd2 Bxg1. The continuation played is still winning for White, however, despite having many complications. The variation continues 21.e5! Ba6 22.Bb4! Qxe5 (22...Be3+ 23.Qxe3+/−; 22...Nh6 23.Nd6+ Kf8 24.g5+−) 23.Nd6+ Qxd6 24.Bxd6+/−.

19. e5!

This sacrifices yet another white rook. More importantly, this move blocks the queen from participating in the defense of the king, and threatens mate in two: 20.Nxg7+ Kd8 21.Bc7#.

19... Qxa1+ 20. Ke2

At this point, Black's attack has run out of steam; Black has a queen and bishop on White's back rank, but cannot effectively mount an immediate attack on White, while White can storm forward. According to Kieseritzky, he resigned at this point. Hübner notes that an article by Friedrich Amelung in the journal Baltische Schachblaetter, 1893, reported that Kiesertizky probably played 20...Na6, but Anderssen then announced the mating moves. The Oxford Companion to Chess also says that Black resigned at this point, citing an 1851 publication. In any case, it is suspected that the last few moves were not actually played on the board in the original game.

20... Na6

The black knight covers c7 as White was threatening 21.Nxg7+ Kd8 22.Bc7#. Another attempt to defend is 20...Ba6, allowing the black king to flee via c8 and b7, although White has enough with the continuation 21.Nc7+ Kd8 and 22.Nxa6, where if now 22...Qxa2 (to defend f7 against Bc7+, Nd6+ and Qxf7#) White can play 23.Bc7+ Ke8 24.Nb4, winning; or, if 22...Bb6 (stopping Bc7+), 23.Qxa8 Qc3 24.Qxb8+ Qc8 25.Qxc8+ Kxc8 26.Bf8 h6 27.Nd6+ Kd8 28.Nxf7+ Ke8 29.Nxh8 Kxf8, with a winning endgame for White.

Position: a8 black rook, c8 black bishop, d8 black king, g8 black knight, h8 black rook, a7 black pawn, d7 black pawn, f7 black pawn, g7 white knight, h7 black pawn, a6 black knight, d6 white bishop, f6 white queen, b5 black pawn, d5 white knight, e5 white pawn, h5 white pawn, g4 white pawn, d3 white pawn, a2 white pawn, c2 white pawn, e2 white king, a1 black queen, g1 black bishop

Position after 22.Qf6+

21. Nxg7+ Kd8 22. Qf6+! (diagram)

This queen sacrifice forces Black to give up his defense of e7.

22... Nxf6 23. Be7# 1–0

At the end, Black is ahead in material by a considerable margin: a queen, two rooks, and a bishop. But the material does not help Black. White has been able to use his remaining pieces—two knights and a bishop—to force mate.

Position: a8 black rook, c8 black bishop, d8 black king, h8 black rook, a7 black pawn, d7 black pawn, e7 white bishop, f7 black pawn, g7 white knight, h7 black pawn, a6 black knight, f6 black knight, b5 black pawn, d5 white knight, e5 white pawn, h5 white pawn, g4 white pawn, d3 white pawn, a2 white pawn, c2 white pawn, e2 white king, a1 black queen, g1 black bishop

Final position after 23.Be7# (a pure mate)

== In popular culture ==
- In Poul Anderson's 1954 short story of the same name, computer chess programs reproduce the Immortal Game's moves.
- In the 2014 video game Dragon Age: Inquisition this game is played sans voir by Iron Bull and Solas during in-game banter.
- In Lily King's 2020 novel Writers & Lovers.
- In the 2025 Filipino film Quezon senatorial maneuvers amongst 64 desks custom-made for the biodrama exactly depict the game.

== See also ==
- Evergreen Game – also won by Anderssen
- Kasparov's Immortal
- List of chess games
