= Karel Traxler =

Czech chess player

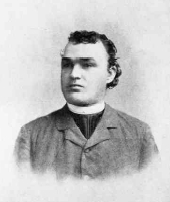
- Chess master, problem composer

Personal information
- Full name: Karel Traxler
- Born: January 17, 1866 Vlachovo Březí
- Died: May 15, 1936 (aged 70) Volyně

Chess career
- Country: Czech Republic

Karel Traxler (1866 – 1936) was a Czech chess master and composer of chess problems. He is best known for the hyper-aggressive variation named after him, the Traxler Variation in the Two Knights Defense.

== Traxler Variation ==
The Traxler Variation was first shown in the following game against Reinisch, played in Hostouň in 1890:

1.e4 e5 2.Nf3 Nc6 3.Bc4 Nf6 4.Ng5 Bc5!? 5.Nxf7?! (modern theory suggests that 5.Bxf7+! is better) Bxf2+! 6.Ke2 (Traxler recommends 6.Kf1! Qe7 7.Nxh8 d5 8.exd5 Nd4, where Black has a strong attack but White may nonetheless hold) 6...Nd4+ 7.Kd3? b5! 8.Bb3 Nxe4!! 9.Nxd8 Nc5+ 10.Kc3 Ne2+! 11.Qxe2 Bd4+ 12.Kb4 a5+ 13.Kxb5 Ba6+ 14.Kxa5 Bd3+ 15.Kb4 Na6+ 16.Ka4 Nb4+ 17.Kxb4 c5#

== Problem composer ==
Because Traxler was a Roman Catholic priest, he rarely played chess in serious competitions. As a composer of chess problems he pursued the style of Bohemian school. He wrote under a number of pseudonyms: Anonymus z Tábora, Karel Kaplan, Vis Maior und Karel Zboněk. From 1896 to 1899, he edited, in part, the journal České listy šachové (Czech chess letters). He composed over 900 chess problems, mainly 2-, 3-, and 4-move problems, but also multiple-move ones, and more rarely, selfmates. With his brother-in-law, Jan Kotrč, he published a selection of 247 problems that he'd composed by 1910.

Karel Traxler
Illustrirte Zeitung, Leipzig 1906

Position: a8 white queen, g7 white king, e5 black king, e4 white knight, f4 white knight, f3 black pawn, f2 white pawn

White mates in 3 moves

Solution: 1.Qf8!

- if 1...Kxe4, then 2.Kf6 Kxf4 3.Qb4# Ideal mate
- if 2...Kd4, then Qe8 Kc4 then 3.Qb4# Model mate
- if 1...Kd4, then 2.Qe8 Kc4 3.Qa4# Model mate
