= Boden's Mate =

Checkmate pattern

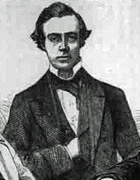
Samuel Boden

Boden's mate is a checkmating pattern in chess characterised by bishops on two criss-crossing diagonals (for example, bishops on a6 and f4 delivering mate to a king on c8), with possible flight squares for the king being occupied by friendly pieces or under attack by enemy pieces. Most often the checkmated king has castled queenside, and is mated on c8 or c1. Many variants on the mate are seen, for example a king on e8 checkmated by bishops on g6 and a3, and a king on f1 checkmated by bishops on h3 and b6. Often the mate is immediately preceded by a sacrifice that opens up the diagonal on which the bishop delivers checkmate, and the mate is often a pure mate (as is the case for all but one of the examples given here).

The mate is named for Samuel Boden, who played a famous early example of it in Schulder–Boden, London 1853. However, it had been known previously from the game Horwitz–Popert, Hamburg 1844.

== History ==
Schulder vs. Boden, 1853

Position: c8 black king, e8 black rook, h8 black rook, a7 black pawn, b7 black pawn, c7 black pawn, g7 black pawn, h7 black pawn, c6 black knight, d5 white bishop, f5 black bishop, f4 white pawn, a3 black bishop, c3 white pawn, e3 white bishop, f3 white queen, a2 white pawn, d2 white knight, f2 white pawn, h2 white pawn, c1 white king, d1 white rook, h1 white rook

Final position after 15...Ba3#
Horwitz vs. Popert, 1844

Position: c8 black king, d8 black rook, g8 black knight, a7 black bishop, b7 black pawn, c7 black pawn, d7 black knight, h7 black rook, a6 black pawn, h6 black queen, d5 black pawn, f5 white rook, d4 white pawn, a3 white pawn, c3 white pawn, b2 white pawn, g2 white queen, h2 white bishop, d1 white rook, f1 white bishop, g1 white knight, h1 white king

Black to play set a trap with 1...Bb8, but then blundered and allowed Boden's mate

Boden's mate is characterised by a king being mated by two bishops on criss-crossing diagonals, with possible flight squares blocked by friendly pieces. Samuel Boden administered an early example of it in the friendly game Schulder–Boden, London 1853. That game went 1.e4 e5 2.Nf3 d6 3.c3 f5 4.Bc4 Nf6 5.d4 fxe4 6.dxe5 exf3 7.exf6 Qxf6 8.gxf3 Nc6 9.f4 Bd7 10.Be3 0-0-0 11.Nd2 Re8 12.Qf3 Bf5 13.0-0-0? (13.Bd5 is better) 13...d5! 14.Bxd5? (allowing a forced mate; better is 14.Rde1, losing a piece) 14...Qxc3+ 15.bxc3 Ba3#, giving the final checkmate position shown in the diagram.

The mate had been known before that, however, from the game Horwitz–Popert, Hamburg 1844 (see diagram). There, Black set a trap with 1...Bb8, which White fell into with 2.Rxd5?. Instead of playing the winning 2...Qxh2+ 3.Qxh2 Rxh2+ 4.Kxh2 c6+ (5.Re5 Nxe5 6.dxe5?? Rxd1) Black blundered with 2...c6??. After that White could not save his rook because of the threatened mate in two. Instead, he surprised Black with 3.Rh5! Qxh5 4.Qxc6+! bxc6 5.Bxa6#.

== Typical pattern ==
The Peruvian Immortal: Canal vs. NN, 1934

Position: c8 black king, d8 black rook, g8 black knight, h8 black rook, a7 black pawn, b7 black pawn, d7 black knight, f7 black pawn, g7 black pawn, h7 black pawn, c6 black pawn, e6 black pawn, a5 black queen, b4 black bishop, d4 white pawn, f4 white bishop, a3 white pawn, c3 white knight, f3 white queen, h3 white pawn, b2 white pawn, c2 white pawn, e2 white bishop, f2 white pawn, g2 white pawn, a1 white rook, e1 white king, h1 white rook

Position after 10...0-0-0??

Position: c8 black king, d8 black rook, g8 black knight, h8 black rook, a7 black pawn, d7 black knight, f7 black pawn, g7 black pawn, h7 black pawn, a6 white bishop, c6 black pawn, e6 black pawn, b4 white pawn, d4 white pawn, f4 white bishop, c3 white knight, h3 white pawn, b2 white pawn, c2 white pawn, d2 white king, f2 white pawn, g2 white pawn, h1 black queen

Final position after 14.Ba6#

Boden's mate has occurred in many later games, usually, as in the Boden and Horwitz games, after the losing king has castled on the queenside, and the winner sets up the mate by a queen sacrifice on c3 or c6.

Perhaps the most famous example of Boden's mate is the so-called Peruvian Immortal game, Canal–NN, simultaneous exhibition, Budapest 1934: 1.e4 d5 2.exd5 Qxd5 3.Nc3 Qa5 4.d4 c6 5.Nf3 Bg4 6.Bf4 e6 7.h3 Bxf3 8.Qxf3 Bb4 9.Be2 Nd7 10.a3 0-0-0?? 11.axb4!! Qxa1+ 12.Kd2! Qxh1 13.Qxc6+! bxc6 14.Ba6#.

== Atypical patterns ==
Alekhine vs. Vasic, 1931

Position: a8 black rook, c8 black bishop, d8 black queen, e8 black king, h8 black rook, a7 black pawn, c7 black pawn, d7 black knight, f7 black pawn, g7 black pawn, b6 black pawn, e6 black pawn, f6 black knight, h6 black pawn, d4 white pawn, a3 white bishop, c3 white pawn, d3 white bishop, a2 white pawn, c2 white pawn, e2 white queen, f2 white pawn, g2 white pawn, h2 white pawn, a1 white rook, e1 white king, g1 white knight, h1 white rook

Position after 9...b6??
Elyashov vs. NN, 1948

Position: a8 black rook, b8 black knight, c8 black bishop, e8 black queen, f8 black king, g8 black knight, h8 black rook, a7 black pawn, b7 black pawn, c7 black pawn, e7 black bishop, h7 black pawn, f5 black pawn, h5 white queen, c4 white bishop, e4 white pawn, h3 black pawn, a2 white pawn, b2 white pawn, c2 white pawn, g2 white pawn, h2 white pawn, a1 white rook, b1 white knight, c1 white bishop, e1 white king, h1 white rook

White, on move, mates in two

More rarely, Boden's mate can occur, for example, (a) where a White bishop on g6 delivers mate to a Black king on e8, which is hemmed in by a White bishop on a3, and its own queen on d8 and knight on d7 or (b) where a bishop on h6 delivers mate to a Black king on f8, which is hemmed in by a White bishop on c4, and its own queen on e8 and bishop on e7. An example of the former was Alekhine–Vasic, Banja Luka 1931: 1.e4 e6 2.d4 d5 3.Nc3 Bb4 4.Bd3 Bxc3+? 5.bxc3 h6? 6.Ba3 Nd7 7.Qe2 dxe4 8.Bxe4 Ngf6 9.Bd3 b6??, when White mated with 10.Qxe6+ fxe6 11.Bg6#. An example of the latter occurred in Elyashov–NN, Paris 1948, which illustrates an opening trap arising from From's Gambit. After 1.f4 e5!? 2.fxe5 d6 3.exd6 Bxd6 4.Nf3 g5 5.d4 g4 6.Ng5?! f5 7.e4 Be7? 8.Nh3! gxh3 9.Qh5+ Kf8 10.Bc4 Qe8, White mated with 11.Qh6+! Nxh6 12.Bxh6#. (11.Bh6+! would likewise have mated in two, though less spectacularly.)

Zukertort vs. Anderssen, 1865

Position: a8 black rook, e8 black queen, f8 black bishop, h8 black rook, a7 black pawn, b7 black pawn, c7 black pawn, d7 black bishop, e7 black king, g7 black pawn, c6 black knight, d6 black pawn, g6 black knight, h6 black pawn, h5 white queen, c4 white bishop, d4 white pawn, e4 white pawn, c3 white pawn, a2 white pawn, b2 white pawn, f2 white pawn, g2 white pawn, h2 white pawn, a1 white rook, b1 white knight, c1 white bishop, f1 white rook, g1 white king

Position after 10...Qe8
Pandolfini vs. NN, 1970

Position: a8 black rook, c8 black bishop, d8 black king, h8 black rook, b7 black pawn, c7 black pawn, g7 black pawn, h7 black pawn, a6 black pawn, f5 black pawn, g5 white bishop, a4 white bishop, e4 black pawn, a2 white pawn, b2 white pawn, c2 white pawn, f2 white pawn, g2 white pawn, h2 white king, a1 white rook, b1 white knight

Final position after 15.Bg5#

In a game between two of the strongest players of the nineteenth century, White delivered a Boden's mate to a king on e7: 1.e4 e5 2.Nf3 Nc6 3.Bb5 Nge7 4.c3 d6 5.d4 Bd7 6.0-0 Ng6 7.Ng5 h6 8.Nxf7 Kxf7 9.Bc4+ Ke7 10.Qh5 Qe8 11.Qg5+! hxg5 12.Bxg5# Zukertort–Anderssen, Breslau 1865. An unusual example of Boden's mate occurring to a king on d8, and without the winning side having to sacrifice to achieve the mating position, occurred in Pandolfini–NN, 1970, after 1.e4 e5 2.Nf3 Nc6 3.Bb5 a6 4.Ba4 Nf6 5.0-0 Nxe4 6.d4 exd4 7.Re1 d5 8.Nxd4 Bd6 9.Nxc6 Bxh2+ 10.Kh1 Qh4 11.Rxe4+ dxe4 12.Qd8+ Qxd8 13.Nxd8+ Kxd8 14.Kxh2 (So far this is a position known to opening theory from the Riga Variation of the Ruy Lopez. White is considered to have the advantage after 14...Be6 15.Be3.) f5?? 15.Bg5# 1–0.

== See also ==
- Checkmate
- Checkmate patterns
