= Esteban Canal =

Peruvian chess grandmaster (1896–1981)

Personal information
- Born: April 19, 1896 Chiclayo, Peru
- Died: February 14, 1981 (aged 84) Varese, Italy

Chess career
- Country: Peru
- Title: Honorary Grandmaster (1977)

Esteban Canal (April 19, 1896 – February 14, 1981) was a leading Peruvian chess player who had his best tournament results in the 1920s and 1930s. Born in Chiclayo, Peru, he later lived in Italy, and died in Varese.

== As a chess player ==
Canal was placed second at Trieste 1923, tied for second at Merano 1926, tenth at Budapest 1929, tied for tenth out of 22 at Carlsbad 1929, tied for seventh at Rohitsch-Sauerbrunn 1929, second at Budapest 1932, tied for fourth at Bad Sliac, first at Budapest 1933, fifth at Mährisch-Ostrau 1933, and tied for first at Reus 1936. After World War II, he was tied for second at Venice 1947, tied for sixth at Bad Gastein 1948, tied for second at Venice 1948, and finally won at Venice 1953.

Canal had an even record against World Champion Max Euwe. He won in Venice in 1948:

1. e4 e5 2. Nf3 Nc6 3. Nc3 Nf6 4. Bb5 Bb4 5. O-O O-O 6. d3 d6 7. Ne2 Bg4 8. c3 Bc5 9. Ng3 Nh5 10. Nf5 Bb6 11. d4 exd4 12. cxd4 d5 13. h3 Bxf5 14. exf5 Nf6 15. Bxc6 bxc6 16. Be3 Ne4 17. Rc1 Re8 18. g4 Qf6 19. Qa4 Qe7 20. Rfe1 Rad8 21. Rxc6 Rd6 22. Rxd6 Nxd6 23. Qc6 Rb8 24. Qxd5 Qd7 25. Bf4 h6 26. Ne5 Qa4 27. Nc6 Rf8 28. f6 Re8 29. Re7 1-0.

Canal played his most famous game, sometimes called the "Peruvian Immortal", at a simultaneous exhibition in 1934. In just 14 moves he sacrificed both his rooks and his queen to finish with Boden's mate.

== As a writer ==
Canal wrote "Strategia di Avamposti" (Outpost Strategy) in 1948, in which he explains his ideas with 50 games commented in his colorful style. It contains games with players such as Capablanca, Nimzovitch, Rubinstein, Vidmar, Reti, Pirc, Saemisch, Menchik, Lilienthal, Bogoljubov, and other greats of the time.

From 1962 to 1978, Esteban Canal also kept a chess column in the Italian magazine "Fenarete Letture d'Italia".

== National teams ==
Canal played in one Chess Olympiad, representing Peru on board 1 in 1950 at Dubrovnik. FIDE made him an International Master in 1950 and an honorary Grandmaster in 1977.

== Bibliography ==
- Canal, Esteban (2017) [1962–1978]. Monti, Luca; Messa, Roberto (eds.). 64 lezioni di scacchi [64 Chess Lessons (collection of chess columns published in the Italian literary journal 'Fenarete' from 1962 to 1978)]. Messaggerie Scacchistiche. ISBN 9788898503148. OCLC 1045992485.
