= Romantic chess =

Style of chess, 18th to 19th century

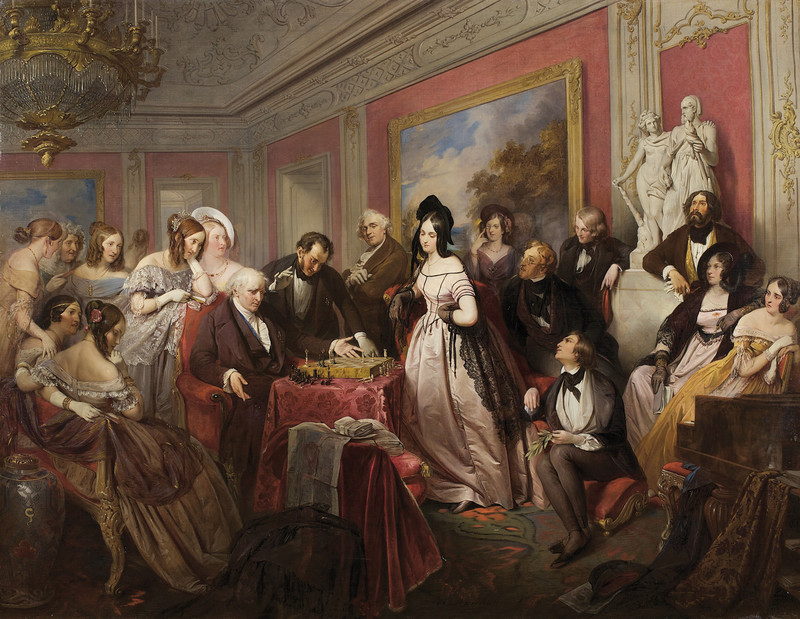
A roomful of fashionable guests is enraptured by an unfolding game. Josef Danhauser, 1839.

Romantic chess is a style of chess that was popular in the 19th century until its decline in the 1880s. This style of chess emphasizes quick, tactical maneuvers rather than long-term strategic planning. Romantic players consider winning in itself to be secondary to winning with style. The Romantic era of play was followed by the Scientific, Hypermodern and New Dynamism eras.

== Theory and characteristics ==
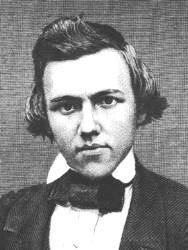
Paul Morphy, American chess player known for his Romantic style of play

Games during the Romantic era typically consisted of 1.e4 openings such as the King's Gambit, Danish Gambit, Ruy Lopez and Italian Game. Queenside pawn openings were not popular and rarely played. Paul Morphy frequently complained about "dull chess" and criticized the Sicilian Defense and queen's pawn openings for leading to this sort of game. Morphy included a stipulation in his matches that at least half the games had to begin with a 1.e4 e5 opening.

Despite the Romantic era's reputation for dashing tactical play and combinations, positional play and closed games were not at all unknown during this time. They were featured prominently at the London tournament of 1851, widely considered the first true chess tournament.

The Romantic era in the arts was roughly analogous to the chess world. The arts were focused on emotional expression more than technical mastery. This would cease towards the end of the 19th century as evolution in the arts (Impressionist music and Symbolist poetry) coincided with Steinitz' emergence as the new stylistic force in the chess world. Some notable chess masters have argued that chess is an art form in addition to a science.

== History ==
The "Immortal Game", Anderssen vs. Kieseritzky, 1851

The Romantic era is generally considered to have reached its peak with Alexander McDonnell and Louis-Charles Mahé de La Bourdonnais, the two dominant chess players of the 1830s. The 1840s were dominated by Howard Staunton, and other leading players of the era included Adolf Anderssen, Daniel Harrwitz, Henry Bird, Louis Paulsen, Paul Morphy and Joseph Henry Blackburne. The Immortal Game, played by Anderssen and Lionel Kieseritzky on 21 June 1851 in London—where Anderssen made bold sacrifices to secure victory, giving up both rooks and a bishop, then his queen, and then checkmating his opponent with his three remaining minor pieces—is considered a supreme example of Romantic chess.

The Romantic era is generally considered to have ended with the 1873 Vienna tournament where Wilhelm Steinitz popularized positional play and the closed game. This domination ushered in a new age of chess known as the "Modern", or Classical school.

During the 1930s, Nazi Germany co-opted chess as a political tool and to that end circulated propaganda alleging the age of Romantic chess, dominated by dashing Aryan players such as Morphy and Anderssen, had been derailed by "cowardly, stingy" positional chess exemplified by Jewish players like Steinitz, Emanuel Lasker, Akiba Rubinstein and others.

== See also ==
- History of chess
- Immortal Game
- Romanticism
- School of chess
