= Donald Byrne =

American chess player (1930–1976)

Personal information
- Born: June 12, 1930 New York City, New York
- Died: April 8, 1976 (aged 45) Philadelphia, Pennsylvania

Chess career
- Country: United States
- Title: International Master (1962)
- Peak rating: 2475 (July 1973)

Donald Byrne (June 12, 1930 – April 8, 1976) was an American university professor and chess player. He held the title International Master, and competed for his country in the Chess Olympiad on several occasions.

== Biography ==
Born in New York City, Byrne was a professor of English. He taught at Pennsylvania State University from 1961 until his death, having been invited there to teach and to coach the varsity chess team. Before his time at Penn State, he was a professor at Valparaiso University in Indiana.

He was a competitor in the chess club run by Brooklyn chess coach and master John W. Collins. Collins wrote about his students in the book My Seven Chess Prodigies, which features both Byrne brothers, Donald and Robert (see more below), and the young Bobby Fischer. The last one, at the age of 13, defeated Byrne on October 17, 1956 in the Game of the Century in New York City.

Byrne died in Philadelphia of complications arising from lupus. He was inducted into the U.S. Chess Hall of Fame in 2003.

== Chess career ==
Byrne won the U.S. Open Chess Championship in 1953 in Milwaukee and around that time he achieved the second-highest rating in the U.S., behind Samuel Reshevsky, against whom Byrne had a winning record. He was awarded the International Master title by FIDE (the World Chess Federation) in 1962, and played for or captained five U.S. Chess Olympiad teams between 1962 and 1972. In 1972, he led a team representing Pennsylvania State University (the remainder of the team was alumni) to the US Amateur Team Championship in Philadelphia. The winning Penn State team consisted of Byrne, Dan Heisman, Steve Wexler, Bill Bickham, and Jim Joachim (alt.). Byrne's elder brother, Grandmaster Robert Byrne, was also a leading player of that time.

Byrne was a great ambassador for American chess, seemingly on good terms with players from both sides of the Iron Curtain. At the 1966 Chess Olympiad in Havana, Cuba, Bobby Fischer, a member of the Worldwide Church of God, would not compete on Saturdays, and the tournament officials knew this, yet they scheduled his first game against a Soviet player on Saturday, leading to accusations and hot tempers by the U.S. and Soviet teams and the tournament officials. Byrne's diplomacy and communication skills and the respect that all the players had for his integrity were enough to get the game rescheduled with everyone saving face. The tournament proceeded without further incident. Host Fidel Castro gave Byrne a hand-carved chess set to thank him.

Byrne was repeatedly asked by his teammates to be team captain, because of his interpersonal acumen and his generous, helpful nature. He routinely helped all the players analyze their games during adjournments, and he repeatedly succeeded in getting the temperamental Fischer to "relax and play the game", as he would tell Fischer when stress threatened his continued participation in tournaments.

The Game of the Century

In the late 1950s Byrne contracted lupus, an auto-immune disease. He was known around campus for his very wide-brimmed brown Stetson hat. He would frequently tell stories about his chess exploits, often turning red from laughter. One story occurred in the 1956 Rosenwald tournament during the Game of the Century between Byrne and Bobby Fischer. Fischer was winning the game decisively, and Byrne asked some of the other players if it would be a good "tip of the hat" to Fischer's superb play to let young Fischer play the game to a checkmate instead of Byrne resigning, which would normally happen between masters. When the other players agreed, Byrne played the game out until Fischer checkmated him. Byrne added "You have to remember, Bobby wasn't yet Bobby Fischer at that time", meaning that the then 13-year-old Fischer was "only" a master, and not yet the 14-year-old wunderkind and top U.S. player he became the following year. Two other Byrne stories posted online: Fischer and the Border Patrol and The Hustler Gets Byrned.

As a player, Byrne popularized the ...a5 line in the Yugoslav Attack in the Dragon Variation of the Sicilian Defence. Against 1. d4, he often preferred to play the Gruenfeld Defense. As White, he preferred using the English Opening.

== Notable games ==
- In the following game, Byrne wins against perennial World Championship contender Efim Geller:

Geller vs. D. Byrne, Moscow 1955
1.e4 c5 2.Nf3 d6 3.d4 cxd4 4.Nxd4 Nf6 5.Nc3 g6 6.Be3 Bg7 7.f3 Nc6 8.Qd2 0-0 9.0-0-0 Be6 10.Kb1 Rc8 11.g4 Qa5 12.Nxe6 fxe6 13.Bc4 Nd8 14.Be2 Nd7 15.Bd4 Ne5 16.f4 Ndc6 17.Bxe5 dxe5 18.f5 Nd4 19.fxg6 hxg6 20.Rhf1 Rf4 21.g5 b5 22.Bd3 Rcf8 23.Qg2 b4 24.Ne2 Qc5 25.Qh3 Rf3 26.Rxf3 Rxf3 27.Qg4 Rxd3 28.Rc1 Rd1 29.c3 Rxc1+ 30.Kxc1 Nxe2+ 31.Qxe2 bxc3 32.Qg2 cxb2+ 33.Kxb2 Qb4+ 34.Kc2 a5 35.Qg4 Qc5+ 36.Kb3 Qb6+ 37.Kc3 a4 38.h4 Qd4+ 39.Kc2 Qf2+ 40.Kd3 Qxa2 41.h5 Qb3+ 42.Kd2 gxh5 0–1

- In this game Byrne gives Samuel Reshevsky, who had clinched the tournament win the round before, his only defeat in a tournament best known for Bobby Fischer's "Game of the Century" win over Byrne:

D. Byrne vs. Reshevsky, Third Rosenwald Trophy 1956
1.d4 Nf6 2.c4 c5 3.d5 e6 4.Nc3 exd5 5.cxd5 d6 6.e4 a6 7.a4 g6 8.Nf3 Bg4 9.Be2 Bf3 10.Bf3 Nbd7 11.0-0 Bg7 12.Bf4 Qc7 13.Rc1 0-0 14.b4 Rfe8 15.a5 Qb8 16.bxc5 Nxc5 17.Na4 Nxa4 18.Qxa4 Qd8 19.Qxb4 Bf8 20.h3 Rb8 21.Rfe1 b6 22.axb6 Qxb6 23.Qxb6 Rxb6 24.e5 dxe5 25.Bxe5 Ba3 26.Rcd1 Bb2 27.Bc7 Rxe1 28.Rxe1 Rb4 29.Rb1 Bc3 30.Rb4 Bxb4 31.d6 Bc3 32.Bc6 Be5 33.g3 g5 34.Bd8 Kg7 35.d7 h5 36.Ba5 Nd7 37.Bxd7 Kg6 38.Kg2 f5 39.Bc8 g4 40.h4 f4 1–0
