= Traxler Counterattack =

Position: a8 black rook, c8 black bishop, d8 black queen, e8 black king, h8 black rook, a7 black pawn, b7 black pawn, c7 black pawn, d7 black pawn, f7 black pawn, g7 black pawn, h7 black pawn, c6 black knight, f6 black knight, c5 black bishop, e5 black pawn, g5 white knight, c4 white bishop, e4 white pawn, a2 white pawn, b2 white pawn, c2 white pawn, d2 white pawn, f2 white pawn, g2 white pawn, h2 white pawn, a1 white rook, b1 white knight, c1 white bishop, d1 white queen, e1 white king, h1 white rook
- Moves: 1.e4 e5 2.Nf3 Nc6 3.Bc4 Nf6 4.Ng5 Bc5
- ECO: C57
- Origin: Reinisch vs. Traxler, Hostouň 1890
- Named after: Karel Traxler
- Parent: Two Knights Defense
- Synonym: Wilkes-Barre Variation

The Traxler Counterattack, also known as the Wilkes-Barre Variation, is a chess opening that begins with the moves:

1. e4 e5
2. Nf3 Nc6
3. Bc4 Nf6
4. Ng5 Bc5!?

The opening is a variation of the Two Knights Defense where White has chosen the offensive line 4.Ng5, immediately attacking the f7-square with the knight and bishop, and Black has replied 4...Bc5, counterattacking the f2-square.

The variation was first seen in the game J. Reinisch–Karel Traxler played in Hostouň in 1890. Later it was named after Wilkes-Barre, Pennsylvania by Frank Marshall, who claimed to be first to analyze and publish it, so today 4...Bc5 is known as both the Traxler Variation and (in the United States and the United Kingdom only) the Wilkes-Barre Variation.

The opening is classified as code C57 in the Encyclopaedia of Chess Openings.

== 5. Nxf7 ==
Position: a8 black rook, c8 black bishop, d8 black queen, e8 black king, h8 black rook, a7 black pawn, b7 black pawn, c7 black pawn, d7 black pawn, f7 white knight, g7 black pawn, h7 black pawn, c6 black knight, f6 black knight, e5 black pawn, c4 white bishop, e4 white pawn, a2 white pawn, b2 white pawn, c2 white pawn, d2 white pawn, f2 black bishop, g2 white pawn, h2 white pawn, a1 white rook, b1 white knight, c1 white bishop, d1 white queen, e1 white king, h1 white rook

Position after 5...Bxf2+!

This is a natural move and one of the points of Ng5. The knight is defended by the bishop on c4, and is forking the black queen and rook. But now the sacrifice 5...Bxf2+! (diagram) will draw out the white king and bring the black queen into play with gain of time.

If White captures the bishop, Black can continue the attack with 6...Nxe4+, after which Kg1 and Ke3 are considered the best moves (as moving the king to any square where it can be checked can lead to a decisive attack for Black), both of which are usually followed up by ...Qh4. If White then blunders by taking the rook on h8, a common beginner mistake, mate in four follows: 8...Qf4+ 9.Ke2 (9.Kd3 Nb4+ 10.Ke2 Qf2#) Qf2+ 10.Kd3 Nb4+ 11.Kxe4 Qf4#.

The best move after Bxf2+ is 6.Kf1, as the white king can no longer be checked, forcing Black to play Qe7 moving out of danger, and allowing White to capture the rook. After 7...d5! 8.exd5 Nd4, however, Black still has a strong attack, but White maintains advantage after 9.d6!

== 5. Bxf7+! ==
This move is preferred by most modern masters, winning a pawn and avoiding the complications that arise after 5.Nxf7 Bxf2+. After 5...Ke7 (better than Kf8 as Black should free the f-file for the king's rook), White should move the bishop again since if it stays on f7, Black can play h6 attacking the knight and undermining the defense of the bishop. White is considered to have a slight edge, but lagging in development due to having to move the bishop and knight multiple times. The absence of the f7-pawn may also be used in Black's favor, as the rook will be active on f8 and the idea Qe8–g6(–h5) is a new possibility.

The main line continues with 6.Bd5 (also possible are 6.Bb3 and 6.b4), which is often given an exclamation mark by theory books. This precise move gives rise to the possibility of future Bxc6 as well as overprotecting the e4-pawn. Black has a chance to exchange knight for bishop but the knight exchange reduces Black's counterattacking chances. Black can now develop the rook to f8, threatening to win the f2-pawn by Bxf2+, Kxf2 and Nxd5+ discovered check.

== J. Reinisch vs. Karel Traxler, 1890 ==
Position: a8 black rook, c8 black bishop, d8 white knight, e8 black king, h8 black rook, a7 black pawn, c7 black pawn, d7 black pawn, g7 black pawn, h7 black pawn, b5 black pawn, e5 black pawn, d4 black knight, e4 black knight, b3 white bishop, d3 white king, a2 white pawn, b2 white pawn, c2 white pawn, d2 white pawn, f2 black bishop, g2 white pawn, h2 white pawn, a1 white rook, b1 white knight, c1 white bishop, d1 white queen, h1 white rook

Position after 9.Nxd8

1. e4 e5 2. Nf3 Nc6 3. Bc4 Nf6 4. Ng5 Bc5 5. Nxf7 Bxf2+ 6. Ke2??

This way of declining the Traxler is inferior to Kf1 as Black does not have to play Qe7 since the white king is still exposed to checks.

6... Nd4+ 7. Kd3? b5!!

If White plays 8.Nxd8, Black will win back the queen after 8...bxc4+ 9.Kxc4 Ba6+ 10.Kb4 Be2 trapping the queen.

8. Bb3 Nxe4!! 9. Nxd8 (diagram)

Traxler comments, "White has no defense; the mating finale is pretty."

9... Nc5+ 10. Kc3 Ne2+! 11. Qxe2 Bd4+ 12. Kb4 a5+ 13. Kxb5 Ba6+ 14. Kxa5 Bd3+ 15. Kb4 Na6+ 16. Ka4 Nb4+ 17. Kxb4 c5#

Black sacrifices his queen and both knights to chase the king to the edge of the board and create a mating net, where the pawn, rook and bishops deliver checkmate.
