= Queen sacrifice =

In chess, the sacrifice of a queen

Position: a8 black rook, d8 black queen, e8 black rook, g8 black king, a7 black pawn, b7 black pawn, c7 black pawn, d7 black bishop, e7 black bishop, f7 black pawn, g7 black pawn, c6 black knight, d6 black pawn, e6 black pawn, g6 black knight, h5 white queen, d4 white pawn, e4 white pawn, a3 white pawn, c3 white knight, d3 white bishop, e3 white bishop, g3 white pawn, b2 white pawn, c2 white pawn, d2 white knight, f2 white pawn, c1 white king, d1 white rook, h1 white rook

White to move. White can checkmate with a sham queen sacrifice as follows: 1.Qh7+ Kf8 2.Qh8+ Nxh8 3.Rxh8#.

In chess, a queen sacrifice is a move that sacrifices a queen. It is the rarest and most tactically significant sacrifice possible, as the queen is the most powerful piece and requires an exceptional tactical, material, or positional advantage in compensation.

== Classification ==
A true sacrifice should not be confused with a blunder, the unintentional loss of a piece, or an exchange, where both players lose their queen in the same interaction.

In his book The Art of Sacrifice in Chess, Rudolf Spielmann distinguishes between real and sham sacrifices. A sham sacrifice leads to a forced and immediate benefit for the sacrificer, usually in the form of a quick checkmate (or perpetual check or stalemate if seeking a draw), or the recouping of the sacrificed material after a forced line. Since any amount of material can be sacrificed as long as checkmate will be achieved, the queen is not above being sacrificed as part of a combination.

Possible reasons for a sham queen sacrifice include:

- a forced checkmate (or stalemate or perpetual check if seeking a draw) after the opponent takes the queen;
- more than adequate material compensation (say, a rook and two knights) after a forced continuation;
- clearing the way for a pawn's promotion to a replacement queen along with some other advantage;
- the subsequent capture of the opponent's queen along with some positional or material gain.

Despite the term "sham", sham queen sacrifices are still often considered brilliancies and are often featured in famous games.

On the other hand, "real" sacrifices, according to Spielmann, are those where the compensation is not immediate, but more positional in nature. Because the queen is the most powerful piece, positional sacrifices of the queen virtually always entail some partial material compensation (for example, sacrificing the queen for a rook and bishop).

Bent Larsen concurs on the distinction between a true sacrifice and a gain in material, namely when trading a queen for a rook and two minor pieces. Many chess piece relative value schemes exist to estimate the exchange value of the queen against other pieces.

== Examples ==
=== Anderssen vs. Kieseritzky, 1851 ===
Position: a8 black rook, c8 black bishop, d8 black king, g8 black knight, h8 black rook, a7 black pawn, d7 black pawn, f7 black pawn, g7 white knight, h7 black pawn, a6 black knight, d6 white bishop, b5 black pawn, d5 white knight, e5 white pawn, h5 white pawn, g4 white pawn, d3 white pawn, f3 white queen, a2 white pawn, c2 white pawn, e2 white king, a1 black queen, g1 black bishop

White to move

A celebrated game by Adolf Anderssen, the Immortal Game, featured a queen sacrifice as part of White's final mating combination. In the diagram position Anderssen gave up his queen with

22. Qf6+!

to deflect Black's knight. The game continued

22... Nxf6 23. Be7#

This is an example of a sham queen sacrifice, as the sacrifice resulted in checkmate only one move later. White was able to mate since his minor pieces were clustered around the Black king, while Black's pieces were either undeveloped or trapped in the white camp and so unable to defend.

=== Anderssen vs. Dufresne, 1852 ===
Position: b8 black rook, e8 black king, g8 black rook, a7 black pawn, b7 black bishop, c7 black pawn, d7 black pawn, e7 black knight, f7 black pawn, h7 black pawn, b6 black bishop, f6 white pawn, a4 white queen, a3 white bishop, c3 white pawn, d3 white bishop, f3 black queen, a2 white pawn, f2 white pawn, g2 white pawn, h2 white pawn, d1 white rook, g1 white king

White to move

In another celebrated game by Anderssen, the Evergreen Game, in the diagram position Anderssen played

21. Qxd7+!!

to once again sacrifice his queen for a mating combination. The game continued

21... Kxd7 22. Bf5+ Ke8 23. Bd7+ Kf8 24. Bxe7#

The game is another example of a sham queen sacrifice. Although Black is on the verge of checkmating White, his defenses around his king are weak, so White was able to mate.

=== Spielmann vs. Moeller, 1920 ===
Position: a8 black rook, c8 black bishop, e8 black king, f8 black bishop, h8 black rook, a7 black pawn, b7 black pawn, c7 black pawn, f7 black pawn, h7 black pawn, c6 black knight, b5 white bishop, d5 black pawn, e5 white pawn, g5 black pawn, d4 white pawn, e4 black knight, f4 black pawn, h4 black queen, c3 white pawn, f3 white queen, a2 white pawn, b2 white pawn, g2 white pawn, h2 white pawn, a1 white rook, b1 white knight, c1 white bishop, f1 white king, g1 white knight, h1 white rook

White to move

Position: a8 black rook, d8 black king, f8 black bishop, h8 black rook, a7 black pawn, b7 black pawn, c7 black pawn, f7 black pawn, h7 black pawn, c6 black knight, f6 white knight, h6 black queen, b5 white bishop, d5 black pawn, e5 white pawn, g5 black pawn, d4 white pawn, f4 black pawn, h4 white pawn, c3 white pawn, f3 white knight, a2 white pawn, b2 white pawn, g2 white pawn, a1 white rook, c1 white bishop, f1 white king, h1 white rook

Position after 13.h4

For an example of a "real" (positional) queen sacrifice, Rudolf Spielmann presented this game against Jorgen Moeller in Gothenburg 1920. In the first diagram Black threatens 9...Bg4 winning the queen, since it must not leave the f2-square unguarded under threat of checkmate. But Spielmann played

9. Nd2!

allowing Black to win his queen, and after

9... Bg4 10. Nxe4 Bxf3 11. Nxf3 Qh6 12. Nf6+ Kd8 13. h4 (second diagram)

White has only a knight and bishop for his queen and pawn, but his minor pieces are very active and the black queen is out of play. White later trapped Black's queen on move 21, and won on move 28.

=== Pilnik vs. Reshevsky, 1942 ===
Position: f8 white queen, a7 black king, b7 black pawn, a6 black pawn, a5 white pawn, g4 black pawn, h4 black pawn, e3 black queen, h1 white king

White to move

A queen sacrifice can sometimes be used as a resource to draw. Here Hermann Pilnik (White) is defending an endgame three pawns down against Samuel Reshevsky (Black), but played

92. Qf2!

(pinning Black's queen against his king).

92... Qxf2

Reshevsky had no choice but to accept the sacrifice and stalemate White, as any other move would lose the queen (and the game) immediately.

=== Byrne vs. Fischer, 1956 ===
Position: a8 black rook, e8 black rook, g8 black king, a7 black pawn, b7 black pawn, f7 black pawn, g7 black bishop, h7 black pawn, b6 black queen, c6 black pawn, g6 black pawn, c5 white bishop, c4 white bishop, d4 white pawn, g4 black bishop, a3 white queen, c3 black knight, f3 white knight, a2 white pawn, f2 white pawn, g2 white pawn, h2 white pawn, d1 white rook, f1 white king, h1 white rook

Black to move

Position: e8 black rook, g8 black king, b7 black pawn, f7 black pawn, g7 black bishop, h7 black pawn, b6 white queen, c6 black pawn, g6 black pawn, a4 black rook, c4 black bishop, f3 white knight, a2 white pawn, f2 white pawn, g2 white pawn, h2 white pawn, d1 black knight, g1 white king, h1 white rook

Position after 25...Nxd1

In The Game of the Century, Bobby Fischer uncorked a queen sacrifice to obtain a winning material advantage. In the first diagram, White's king is stuck in the center and Black has control of the open e-file. Fischer ignored the threat to his queen and played

17... Be6!!

The game continued

18. Bxb6 Bxc4+ 19. Kg1 Ne2+ 20. Kf1 Nxd4+ 21. Kg1 Ne2+ 22. Kf1 Nc3+ 23. Kg1 axb6 24. Qb4 Ra4 25. Qxb6 Nxd1 (second diagram)

and Black has emerged with a large material and positional advantage. He can threaten back-rank mate to win even more material; his pieces are coordinated and White's rook is trapped in the corner. Black won by checkmate on move 41.

=== Carlsen vs. Karjakin, 2016 ===
Position: c8 white rook, e7 black bishop, f7 black pawn, g7 black pawn, h7 black king, b6 black pawn, d6 black pawn, f5 white rook, h5 white pawn, e4 white pawn, f4 white queen, f3 white pawn, a2 black rook, f2 black queen, h2 white pawn, h1 white king

White to move. Carlsen played 50.Qh6+!!

In the World Chess Championship 2016, Magnus Carlsen defeated Sergey Karjakin in the final tie-break game with the queen sacrifice

50. Qh6+!!

Karjakin resigned because either way the queen is captured, there is mate on the next move: 50...Kxh6 51.Rh8#, or 50...gxh6 51.Rxf7#.

=== Other notable games ===
- In the Opera Game, Morphy gave up his queen in a final deflection sacrifice in order to mate.
- In the Gold Coins Game, Marshall's final move placed the queen on a square where it threatened checkmate and could be captured by three different pieces, with any capture leading to victory, triggering a shower of gold coins according to legend.
- In a friendly game between Edward Lasker and George Alan Thomas, Lasker found a celebrated queen sacrifice which initiated a king hunt, bringing the black king to White's first rank, where it was mated.
- Philidor's Legacy refers to a smothered mate involving a queen sacrifice.
- In a whirlwind of tactics, Bent Larsen sacrificed his queen to defeat World Champion Tigran Petrosian in 1966.
- In a blitz chess24.com game played in 2020, Brazilian grandmaster Luis Paulo Supi used a queen sacrifice to defeat World Champion Magnus Carlsen. The match was subsequently named "the Brazilian Immortal".

== See also ==
- Romantic era of chess
