= David Vincent Hooper =

British chess player and writer (1915–1998)

Personal information
- Born: 31 August 1915 Reigate, England
- Died: 3 May 1998 (aged 82)

Chess career
- Country: England

David Vincent Hooper (31 August 1915 – 3 May 1998), born in Reigate, was a British chess player and writer. As an amateur, he tied for fifth place in the 1949 British Championship at Felixstowe. He was the British correspondence chess champion in 1944 and the London Chess Champion in 1948. He played in the Chess Olympiad at Helsinki in 1952.

== Early life ==
Hooper was one of eight children and attended the Whitgift School, Croydon.

== Chess ==
Hooper was an expert in the chess endgame and in chess history of the nineteenth century. He is best known for his chess writing, including The Oxford Companion to Chess (1992 with Ken Whyld), Steinitz (Hamburg 1968, in German), and A Pocket Guide to Chess Endgames (London 1950).

== Books by Hooper ==
- Hooper, David (1970), A Pocket Guide to Chess Endgames, Bell & Hyman, ISBN 0-7135-1761-1
- Euwe, Max; Hooper, David (1959), A Guide to Chess Endings, Dover (1976 reprint), ISBN 0-486-23332-4
- Hooper, David; Whyld, Kenneth (1992), The Oxford Companion to Chess (2nd ed.), Oxford University Press, ISBN 0-19-280049-3
- Hooper, David (1968), Practical Chess Endgames (Chess Handbooks), Law Book Co of Australasia, ISBN 0-7100-5226-X
- Cafferty, Bernard; Hooper, David (1979), A Complete Defence to 1P-K4: A Study of Petroff's Defence (2nd ed.), Pergammon Press, ISBN 0-08-024088-7
- Cafferty, Bernard; Hooper, David (1981), A Complete Defence to 1d4: A Study of the Queen's Gambit Accepted, Pergammon Press, ISBN 0-08-024102-6
- Hooper, David; Brandreth, Dale (1975), The Unknown Capablanca, B.T. Batsford, ISBN 978-0-486-27614-4
