= Ken Whyld =

British chess writer (1926–2003)

- Country: England
- Born: 6 March 1926; Nottingham, England
- Died: 11 July 2003 (aged 77)

Kenneth Whyld (6 March 1926 – 11 July 2003) was a British chess author and researcher, best known as the co-author (with David Hooper) of The Oxford Companion to Chess, a single-volume chess reference work in English.

Whyld was a strong amateur chess player, taking part in the British Chess Championship in 1956 and winning the county championship of Nottinghamshire. He subsequently made his living in information technology while writing books on chess and researching its history.

As well as The Oxford Companion to Chess, Whyld was the author of other reference works such as Chess: The Records (1986), an adjunct to the Guinness Book of Records and the comprehensive The Collected Games of Emanuel Lasker (1998). He also researched more esoteric subjects, resulting in works such as Alekhine Nazi Articles (2002) on articles in favour of the Nazi Party supposedly written by world chess champion Alexander Alekhine, and the bibliographies Fake Automata in Chess (1994) and Chess Columns: A List (2002).

From 1978 until his death in 2003, Whyld wrote the "Quotes and Queries" column in the British Chess Magazine.

A number of chess historians, including Dale Brandreth, Frank Skoff and Edward Winter, all of whom had close contact with Whyld, came to question his reliability and bona fides on certain issues.

Shortly after Whyld's death, the Ken Whyld Association was established with the aim of compiling a comprehensive chess bibliography in database form and promoting chess history.

Whyld's library was later sold to the Musée Suisse du Jeu, located on the shores of Lake Geneva in Switzerland (as reported in number 152 of EG).
