= The Oxford Companion to Chess =

Book by David Vincent Hooper and Kenneth Whyld

The Oxford Companion to Chess (cover of the first edition)

The Oxford Companion to Chess, of the Oxford Companions series, is a reference book in encyclopaedia format on the game of chess, written by David Vincent Hooper and Kenneth Whyld and first published in 1984.

== History and content ==
The first edition of the book was published in 1984 by Oxford University Press; the second in 1992, with over 500 entries, including rules, terms, strategies, tactics, over 500 brief biographies of famous players, and entries on more than 700 named openings and opening variations. There is an extensive index of opening variations and sub-variations, listing 1,327 named variations.

The book also discusses variants from other countries (such as shogi or xiangqi), chess variants (such as three dimensional chess), and some forms of fairy chess.

Wyld, in a 1986 letter to Chess Notes on the terminology and the prose used in the text, wrote, "Hooper and I spent some effort in writing the Companion to avoid words that have a different meaning across the Atlantic."

A third edition is not forthcoming, all the more so since its authors have died.

== Reviews ==
Historian and chess master Tim Harding found the Companion to be "rightly regarded as far superior to the various other chess encyclopaedias in English." He laments the decision to include living masters in the 2nd edition, because that meant that earlier articles had to be deleted, for space, but also points out that a few entries are carrying inaccuracies.

Edward Winter, reviewing the first edition, wrote that the Companion is "brilliantly researched" and a "wonderful achievement" in the "trickiest of areas, the single volume reference work." He considers it to be "overwhelmingly superior in all respects" to the Batsford Chess Encyclopedia. Film historian and chess aficionado Luke McKernan found it to be "a companion without parallel."
