= Chess aesthetics =

Beauty in chess

CHESTHETICA v9.01, chess aesthetics evaluating software

Chess aesthetics or beauty in chess is the aesthetic appreciation of chess games and problems, by both players and composers. This is evident, for example, in brilliancy prizes awarded to some games in certain tournaments and also in the world of chess composition. There are many books published featuring chess problems or puzzles that emphasize its aesthetic aspect. One of the earliest is from the 9th century AD. Aesthetics in chess can be both a source of pleasure for humans and also instruction, as compositions or games featuring it typically illustrate original ideas or new instantiations of old ones. A good chess problem composer, however, is not necessarily a good player.

Factors about a game or move sequence (also referred to as a combination) that might cause it to be regarded as 'brilliant' by most players include, among other things: expediency, disguise, sacrifice, correctness, preparation, paradox, unity and originality.

- Expediency refers to a move's effectiveness in achieving something tangible, like checkmate or a decisive material gain.
- Disguise occurs when a move played (usually the key move) does not expose the solution immediately.
- Sacrifice refers to the exchange of a more powerful piece for a weaker one, but can also mean the exchange of other less tangible advantages, like mobility.
- Correctness simply means the solution should work against any defense. (A plus but not always possible in real games.)
- Preparation means that the aesthetic perceived—say, in a particular tactical combination—was achieved in great part due to the strategic play preceding it.
- Paradox refers to the range of things that violate 'good practice' in chess, for example, the deliberate exposure of one's king.
- Unity refers to the cooperation between pieces toward the attainment of a specific goal (e.g. checkmate, winning material, controlling more space).
- Originality means something the observer has not seen before, and must therefore rely heavily on personal experience.

Composition conventions such as not having any checks or captures in the first (i.e. key) move, and the use of variations to illustrate a particular theme (e.g. zugzwang, pin), also play a role in the aesthetics of the game.

Conceptually, a 'common ground' of aesthetics between the domains of real (e.g. tournament) games and compositions can be established. These are beauty characteristics that apply approximately equally to both domains; examples include heuristic violations, economy and material sacrifice. This common ground is useful in computational models of aesthetics in the game because it helps in experiments comparing the beauty of compositions (on average, considered more beautiful) against the beauty of real games (on average, considered less beautiful). Some factors that pertain solely to real games (e.g. pressure under time control) or compositions (e.g. avoidance of castling moves) may be conflated with aesthetics in the game—and perhaps to some degree this is justifiable; however, they would lie outside the common ground described above.

== See also ==
- Chess in the arts
