= Ideal mate =

Special checkmate position in chess

Position: c6 white queen, d6 black circle, e6 black circle, f6 black circle, d5 black circle, e5 black king, f5 black cross, d4 white circle, e4 black circle, f4 black cross, g4 white king, f3 white knight

Example of ideal mate: Squares with a black dot are threatened by the white queen; squares with a cross, the white king; squares with a white dot, the knight, which also attacks the black king.

In chess, an ideal mate is a checkmate position that is a special form of model mate. While in a model mate, each piece on the mating player's side (possibly excluding the king and pawns depending on context) participates in the mate, an ideal mate involves all the pieces of the mated player as well, typically by blocking the mated king's field of movement so that it cannot escape. As in a model mate, an ideal mate also involves the mating pieces attacking the vacant squares around the mated king exactly once, and not attacking the mated player's other pieces occupying the king's field of movement.

== Examples ==
Michal Dragoun, Phénix 1993

Position: d7 white king, e5 white knight, h5 white rook, d4 black king, e4 black rook

Helpmate in 2 moves (h#2). There are two solutions, both leading to ideal mates.

Position: e6 white king, e5 white knight, e4 black king, h4 white rook, e3 black rook

One of the solutions to the above problem: 1...Re3 2.Ke6 Ke4 3.Rh4#

For example, in the second position shown, White delivers an ideal mate. The mate is delivered with the white rook, and the black king cannot stay or move to d4 or f4. The white king prevents the black king from escaping to d5 or f5 and prevents capture of the knight, while that knight prevents escape to d3 and f3, and the black rook blocks escape to e3, while not being attacked by any of White's pieces.

The very restrictive definition of an ideal mate means that it rarely ends actual chess games, excepting some basic checkmates (such as king and rook against a lone king, which, uniquely among basic checkmates, is always an ideal mate), but ideal mates are a common theme in chess problems, such as the one shown.
