= Model mate =

Special checkmate position

In chess, a model mate is a type of pure mate checkmating position in which:

- the checkmated king and all vacant squares in its field are attacked only once;
- squares in the king's field occupied by friendly units are not also attacked by the mating side (unless such a unit is necessarily pinned to the king); and
- all units of the mating side (with the possible exception of the king and pawns) participate actively in forming the mating net.

Model mates are extremely rare in practical play, but they add value to chess problems as they are considered artistic. In fact, they form the basis of the so-called Bohemian school of chess composition, most fruitful in threemovers and moremovers. Model mates are very usual in helpmates and they appear often in selfmates too.

== Examples ==
Miroslav Havel
1st Prize, Zlata Praha 1910

Position: g8 white queen, f7 white rook, f6 black pawn, e5 black pawn, f5 black king, a4 white king, g4 white knight, e3 white bishop, d2 black knight, c1 black knight

Mate in three moves

This example shows a problem by Miroslav Havel. The key 1. Bc5!! gives a flight square for the black king and threatens 2.Rxf6+ Ke4 3.Nf2# with a model mate. The main variations end with model mates from white batteries:

1... Kf4 2. Nxf6 (threat 3.Qg4#) 2... e4 3. Nd7#, and
1... Ke4 2. Nf2+ Kd5 3. Rc7#

There are several other variations (after 1...Ne4 and 1...Ke6), which do not end with model mates, and allow for multiple continuations. In the Bohemian school they are irrelevant, as long as they end with a mate in a prescribed number of moves.

Michal Dragoun
Phénix 1993

Position: d7 white king, e5 white knight, h5 white rook, d4 black king, e4 black rook

Helpmate in two moves (h#2), two solutions

This example shows a helpmate, in which both sides cooperate to achieve a mate to the black king. It has two solutions ending in model mates (Black moves first in helpmates):

1. Re3 Ke6 2. Ke4 Rh4#, and
1. Kc5 Kc7 2. Rc4 Nc6#

If all units of both colours are involved in a model mate, then it is an ideal mate. Both mates in the presented helpmate are ideal mates.

== See also ==
- Chess problem terminology
- Genrikh Kasparyan
- Piotr Ruszczyński
- Mating net
