= Chess =

Traditional board game for two players

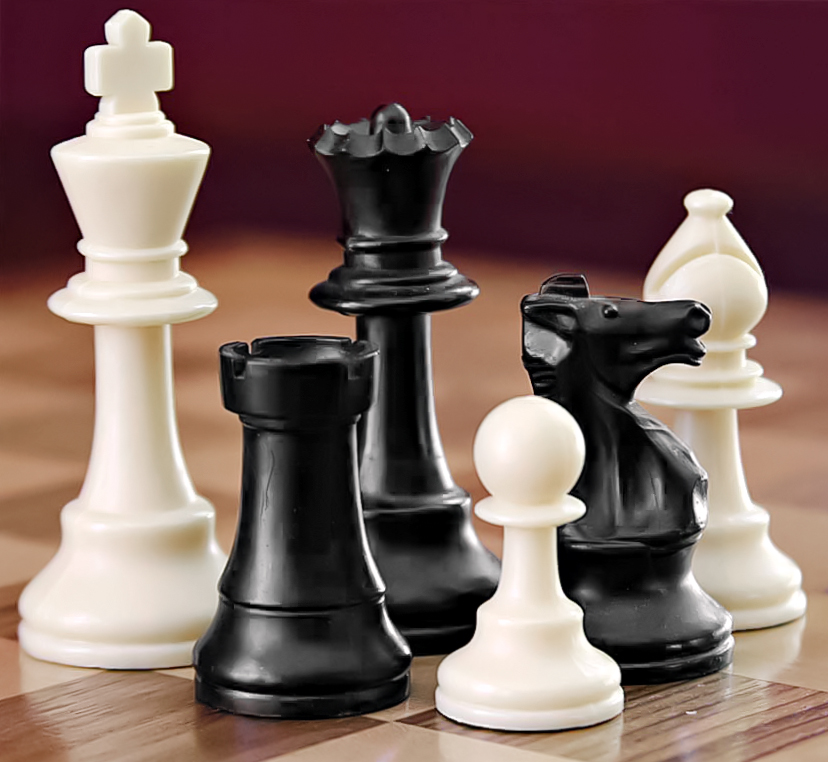
- Part of a Staunton chess set Left to right: white king, black rook, black queen, white pawn, black knight, white bishop
- Years active: c. 1475 to present (predecessors c. 900 years earlier)
- Genres: Board game; Abstract strategy game; Mind sport
- Players: 2
- Chance: None
- Skills: Strategy, tactics

Chess is a board game for two players, played on a square board consisting of 64 squares arranged in an 8×8 grid. The players, referred to as "White" and "Black", each control sixteen pieces: one king, one queen, two rooks, two bishops, two knights, and eight pawns, with each piece type having a different pattern of movement. An enemy piece may be captured (removed from the board) by moving one's own piece onto the square it occupies. The objective of the game is to checkmate (threaten with inescapable capture) the enemy king. There are also several ways a game can end in a draw.

The recorded history of chess dates back to the emergence of chaturanga in 7th-century India. Chaturanga is also thought to be an ancestor of similar games like janggi, xiangqi, and shogi. After its introduction to Persia, it spread to the Arab world and then to Europe. The modern rules of chess emerged in Europe at the end of the 15th century, becoming standardized and gaining universal acceptance by the end of the 19th century. Today, chess is one of the world's most popular games, with millions of players worldwide.

Organized chess arose in the 19th century. International chess competitions today are governed by FIDE (French: Fédération Internationale des Échecs, 'International Chess Federation'). The first universally recognized World Chess Champion, Wilhelm Steinitz, claimed his title in 1886; Gukesh Dommaraju is the current World Champion, having won the title in 2024.

A large body of chess theory has developed since the game's inception. Aspects of art are found in chess composition, and chess has in turn influenced Western culture and the arts, and has relevance to other fields such as mathematics, computer science, and psychology. One of the goals of early computer scientists was to create a chess-playing machine. In 1997, Deep Blue became the first computer to win a match against a reigning World Champion when it defeated Garry Kasparov. Modern chess engines are significantly stronger than human players and have greatly influenced the development of chess theory. Chess, however, is not a solved game.

== Rules ==
The rules of chess are published by FIDE (French: Fédération Internationale des Échecs, 'International Chess Federation'), world governing body of chess, in its Handbook. Rules published by national governing bodies, or by unaffiliated chess organizations, commercial publishers, etc., may differ in some details. For example, the United States Chess Federation (USCF) diverged from FIDE in the 1980s over differences in time-keeping rules.

=== Setup ===
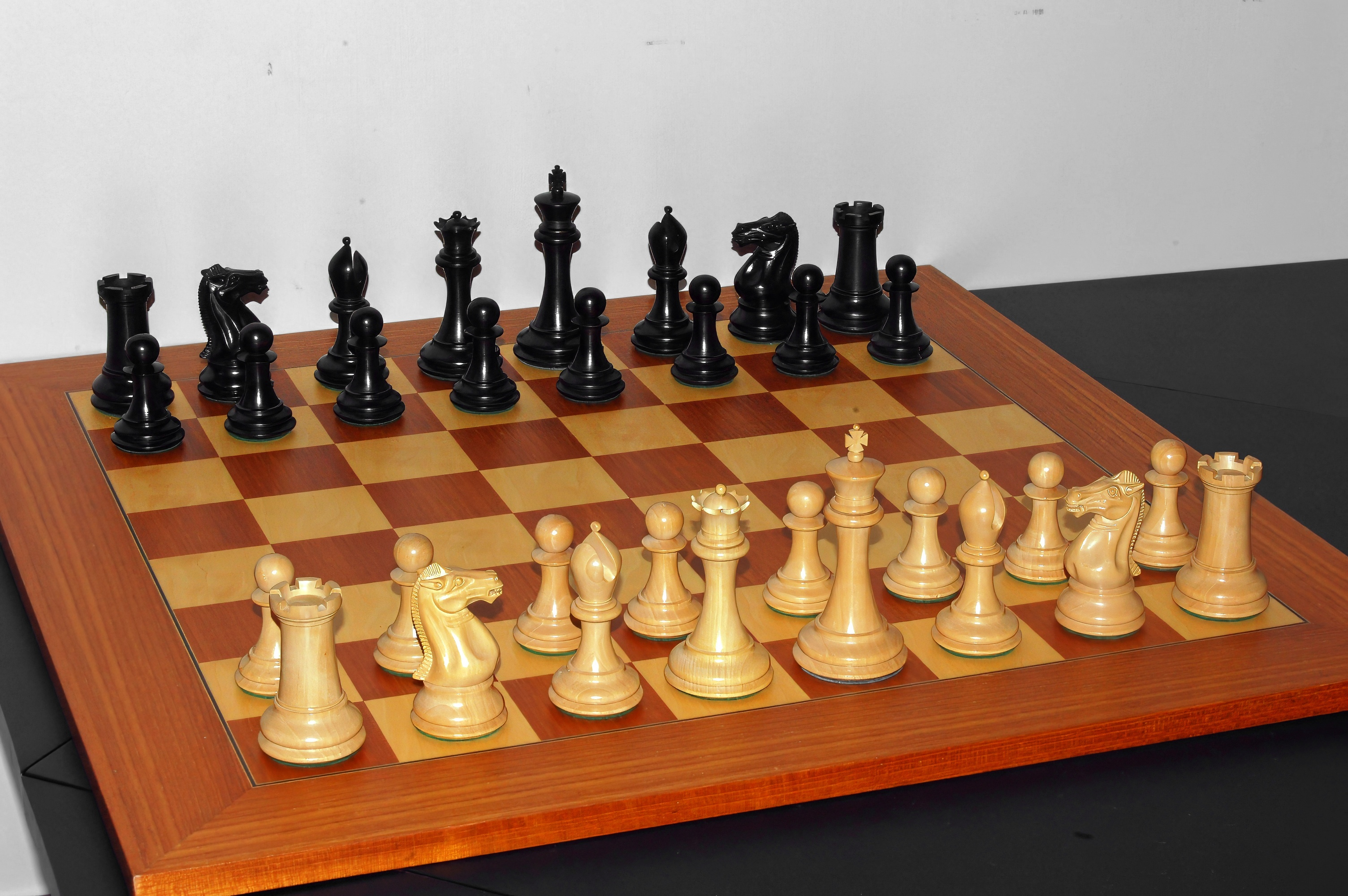
Setup at the start of a chess game

Chess sets come in a wide variety of styles. The Staunton pattern is the most common, and is usually required for competition. Chess sets come with pieces in two colors, referred to as white and black, regardless of their actual color; the players controlling the color sets are referred to as White and Black, respectively. Each set comes with at least the following 16 pieces in both colors: one king, one queen, two rooks, two bishops, two knights, and eight pawns.

The game is played on a square board of eight rows (called ranks) and eight columns (called files). Although it does not affect gameplay, by convention the 64 squares alternate in color and are referred to as light and dark squares.

Position: a8 black rook, b8 black knight, c8 black bishop, d8 black queen, e8 black king, f8 black bishop, g8 black knight, h8 black rook, a7 black pawn, b7 black pawn, c7 black pawn, d7 black pawn, e7 black pawn, f7 black pawn, g7 black pawn, h7 black pawn, a2 white pawn, b2 white pawn, c2 white pawn, d2 white pawn, e2 white pawn, f2 white pawn, g2 white pawn, h2 white pawn, a1 white rook, b1 white knight, c1 white bishop, d1 white queen, e1 white king, f1 white bishop, g1 white knight, h1 white rook

Initial position: (first row) rook, knight, bishop, queen, king, bishop, knight, rook; (second row) pawns

To start the game, White's pieces are placed on the first rank in the following order, from left to right: rook, knight, bishop, queen, king, bishop, knight, rook. Pawns are placed on each square of the second rank. Black's position mirrors White's, with equivalent pieces on every file. The board is oriented so that the right-hand corner nearest each player is a light square; as a result the white queen always starts on a light square, while the black queen starts on a dark square. This may be remembered by the phrases "white on the right" and "queen on her color".

In informal games, colors may be decided either by mutual agreement, or by lot. The rules of chess do not prescribe any particular method for deciding colors by lot, but a common traditional method is to conceal a white pawn in one hand and a black pawn in the other and have the opponent choose.

In competitions, the piece colors are normally allocated to players by the organizers, but occasionally are decided by lot, for example in the first round of a player vs. player match or a team vs team match. In this case, the organizers are free to use any method they wish to decide the colors, from a simple coin toss or card draw, to more creative methods. For example, at the U.S. China Chess Summit, a friendly match between the two countries played in Seattle in 2001, the first round colors were decided by a game of Jenga, won by the Chinese.

=== Movement ===
White moves first, after which players alternate turns. One piece is moved per turn (except when castling, during which two pieces are moved). In the diagrams, dots mark the squares to which each type of piece can move if unoccupied by friendly pieces and there are no intervening piece(s) of either color (except the knight, which leaps over any intervening pieces). With the sole exception of en passant, a piece captures an enemy piece by moving to the square it occupies, removing it from play and taking its place. The pawn is the only piece that does not capture the way it moves, and it is the only piece that moves and captures in only one direction (forwards from the player's perspective). A piece is said to control empty squares on which it could capture, attack squares with enemy pieces it could capture, and defend squares with pieces of the same color on which it could recapture. Moving is compulsory; a player may not skip a turn.

Moves of the king

Position: e6 white circle, f6 white circle, g6 white circle, e5 white circle, f5 white king, g5 white circle, e4 white circle, f4 white circle, g4 white circle

Moves of a rook

Position: d8 white circle, d7 white circle, d6 white circle, a5 white circle, b5 white circle, c5 white circle, d5 white rook, e5 white circle, f5 white circle, g5 white circle, h5 white circle, d4 white circle, d3 white circle, d2 white circle, d1 white circle

Moves of a bishop

Position: h8 white circle, a7 white circle, g7 white circle, b6 white circle, f6 white circle, c5 white circle, e5 white circle, d4 white bishop, c3 white circle, e3 white circle, b2 white circle, f2 white circle, a1 white circle, g1 white circle

Moves of a queen

Position: d8 white circle, h8 white circle, a7 white circle, d7 white circle, g7 white circle, b6 white circle, d6 white circle, f6 white circle, c5 white circle, d5 white circle, e5 white circle, a4 white circle, b4 white circle, c4 white circle, d4 white queen, e4 white circle, f4 white circle, g4 white circle, h4 white circle, c3 white circle, d3 white circle, e3 white circle, b2 white circle, d2 white circle, f2 white circle, a1 white circle, d1 white circle, g1 white circle

Moves of a knight

Position: c7 white circle, e7 white circle, b6 white circle, f6 white circle, d5 white knight, b4 white circle, f4 white circle, c3 white circle, e3 white circle

Moves of a pawn

Position: b7 white cross, c7 white circle, d7 white cross, g7 black pawn, c6 white pawn, f6 black cross, g6 black circle, h6 black cross, g5 black circle, b4 white circle, a3 white cross, b3 white circle, c3 white cross, f3 black pawn, b2 white pawn, e2 black cross, f2 black circle, g2 black cross

- The king moves one square in any direction. There is also a special move called castling which moves the king and a rook. The king is the most valuable piece—it is illegal to play any move that puts one's king under attack by an opponent piece. A move that attacks the king must be parried immediately; if this cannot be done, the game is lost. (See § Check and checkmate.)
- A rook can move any number of squares along a rank or file. A rook is involved in the king's castling move.
- A bishop can move any number of squares diagonally.
- A queen combines the power of a rook and bishop and can move any number of squares along a rank, file, or diagonal.
- A knight moves to any of the closest squares that are not on the same rank, file, or diagonal. (Thus the move forms an "L"-shape: two squares vertically and one square horizontally, or two squares horizontally and one square vertically.) The knight is the only piece that can leap over other pieces.
- A pawn can move forward to the unoccupied square immediately in front of it on the same file, or on its first move it can optionally advance two squares along the same file, provided both squares are unoccupied (diagram dots). A pawn can capture an opponent's piece on a square diagonally in front of it by moving to that square (diagram crosses). It cannot capture a piece while advancing along the same file, nor can it move to either square diagonally in front without capturing. Pawns have two special moves: the en passant capture and promotion.

==== Check and checkmate ====
Position: c6 black king, c2 white rook, e1 white king

The black king is in check by the rook.

Position: e3 black bishop, f3 black bishop, h3 black king, h1 white king

White is in checkmate, being unable to escape attack by the bishop on f3.

When a king is under immediate attack, it is in check. A move in response to a check is legal only if it results in a position in which the king is no longer in check. There are three ways to counter a check:

- Capture the checking piece.
- Interpose a piece between the checking piece and the king (possible only if the attacking piece is a queen, rook, or bishop and there is a square between it and the king).
- Move the king to a square where it is not under attack.

The object of the game is to checkmate the opponent; this occurs when the opponent's king is in check, and there is no legal way to get it out of check. In casual games, it is common to announce "check" when putting the opponent's king in check, but this is not required by the rules of chess and is usually not done in tournaments.

==== Castling ====
Examples of castling

Kings can castle once per game. Castling consists of moving the king two squares toward either rook of the same color, and then placing the rook on the square that the king crossed over. After castling, both pieces continue to move according to their normal movement rules.

Castling is possible only if the following conditions are met:

- Neither the king nor the rook has previously moved during the game.
- There are no pieces between the king and the rook.
- The king is not in check and does not cross or finish on a square controlled by an enemy piece.

Castling is still permitted if the rook is under attack, or if the rook would cross an attacked square. It is also still permitted if the king had been in check earlier in the game, provided that the check was resolved without moving the king.

==== Special pawn moves ====
Examples of special pawn moves: (left) promotion; (right) en passant

Pawns have two special moves:

- En passant: A pawn can be captured en passant ("in passing") after it makes a two-square advance to the same rank as an opponent's pawn on an adjacent file, whereupon the opponent's pawn moves to one square behind the captured pawn. A pawn can be captured en passant only on the turn after it makes a two-square advance. In the animated diagram, the black pawn advances two squares from g7 to g5, and the white pawn on f5 takes it en passant, landing on g6.
- Promotion: A pawn is promoted when it advances to its last rank, being replaced with the player's choice of a queen, rook, bishop, or knight. Usually, pawns are promoted to queens; choosing another piece is called underpromotion. In the animated diagram, the c7-pawn is advanced to c8 and promoted to a queen. If the required piece is not available (e.g. a second queen), an inverted rook is sometimes used as a substitute, but this is not recognized in FIDE-sanctioned games.

=== End of the game ===
==== Win ====
A game can be won in the following ways:

- Checkmate: The opposing king is in check and no move can get it out of check. (See § Check and checkmate.)
- Resignation: A player may resign, conceding the game to the opponent. If, however, the opponent has no way of checkmating the resigned player, this is a draw under FIDE Laws. Most tournament players consider it good etiquette to resign in a hopeless position.
- Win on time: In games with a time control, a player wins if the opponent runs out of time, even if the opponent has a superior position, as long as the player has a theoretical possibility to checkmate the opponent were the game to continue.
- Forfeit: A player who cheats, violates the rules, or violates the rules of conduct specified for the particular tournament can be forfeited. Occasionally, both players are forfeited.

==== Draw ====
There are several ways a game can end in a draw:

- Stalemate: If the player to move has no legal move, but is not in check, the position is a stalemate, and the game is drawn.
- Dead position: If neither player is able to checkmate the other by any legal sequence of moves, the game is drawn. For example, if only the kings are on the board, all other pieces having been captured, checkmate is impossible and the game is drawn by this rule. On the other hand, if each player still has a knight, there is a theoretical albeit highly unlikely possibility of checkmate, so this rule does not apply. The dead position rule supersedes an older rule that referred to "insufficient material", thereby extending it to include other positions in which checkmate is impossible, such as blocked pawn endings in which the pawns cannot be attacked.
- Draw by agreement: In tournament chess, draws are most commonly reached by mutual agreement between the players. The correct procedure is to make a move, to verbally offer the draw, and then to start the opponent's clock. If a draw is offered before making a move, the opponent has the right to ask the player to make a move before making their decision on whether or not to accept the draw offer. Traditionally, players were allowed to agree to a draw at any point in the game, occasionally even without having played a single move. Since the 2000s, efforts have been made to discourage early draws, for example by forbidding draw offers before a certain number of moves have been completed or even forbidding draw offers altogether.
- Threefold repetition: This most commonly occurs when neither side is able to avoid repeating moves without incurring a disadvantage. The three occurrences of the position need not occur on consecutive moves for a claim to be valid. The addition of the fivefold repetition rule in 2014 requires the arbiter to intervene immediately and declare the game a draw after five occurrences of the same position, consecutive or otherwise, without requiring a claim by either player. FIDE rules make no mention of perpetual check; this is merely a specific type of draw by threefold repetition.
- Fifty-move rule: If during the previous 50 moves no pawn has been moved and no capture has been made, either player can claim a draw. The addition of the seventy-five-move rule in 2014 requires the arbiter to intervene and immediately declare the game drawn after 75 moves without a pawn move or capture, without requiring a claim by either player. There are several known endgames in which it is possible to force a mate but it requires more than 50 moves before a pawn move or capture is made; examples include some endgames with two knights against a pawn and some pawnless endgames such as queen against two bishops. Historically, FIDE has sometimes revised the fifty-move rule to make exceptions for these endgames, but these exceptions have since been repealed. Some correspondence chess organizations do not enforce the fifty-move rule. (Note: The fifty-move rule is not applied at FICGS.)
- Draw on time: In games with a time control, the game is drawn if a player is out of time but no sequence of legal moves would allow the opponent to checkmate the player.
- Draw by resignation: Under FIDE Laws, a game is drawn if a player resigns but no sequence of legal moves would allow the opponent to checkmate that player.

Position: c6 white queen, a5 black king, c4 white king

Black (to move) is not in check and has no legal move. The result is stalemate.

Position: e6 black king, e5 white bishop, e4 white king

A dead position; White's king and bishop are insufficient to deliver checkmate.

Position: d6 black king, a5 white cross, b5 black pawn, c5 white cross, d5 white cross, e5 black pawn, f5 white cross, g5 white cross, h5 black pawn, a4 black cross, b4 white pawn, c4 black cross, d4 black cross, e4 white pawn, f4 black cross, g4 black cross, h4 white pawn, d3 white king

Also a dead position; neither king can capture the other's pawns in order to promote a pawn and give checkmate.

=== Time control ===
In competition, chess games are played with a time control. Time controls are generally divided into categories based on the amount of time given to each player, which range from classical time controls, which allot about 2 hours or more to each player and which can take upwards of seven hours (even longer if adjournments are permitted), to bullet chess, in which players receive less than three minutes each. Between these are rapid chess (ten to sixty minutes per player) and blitz chess (three to ten minutes). Non-classical chess is sometimes referred to as fast chess.

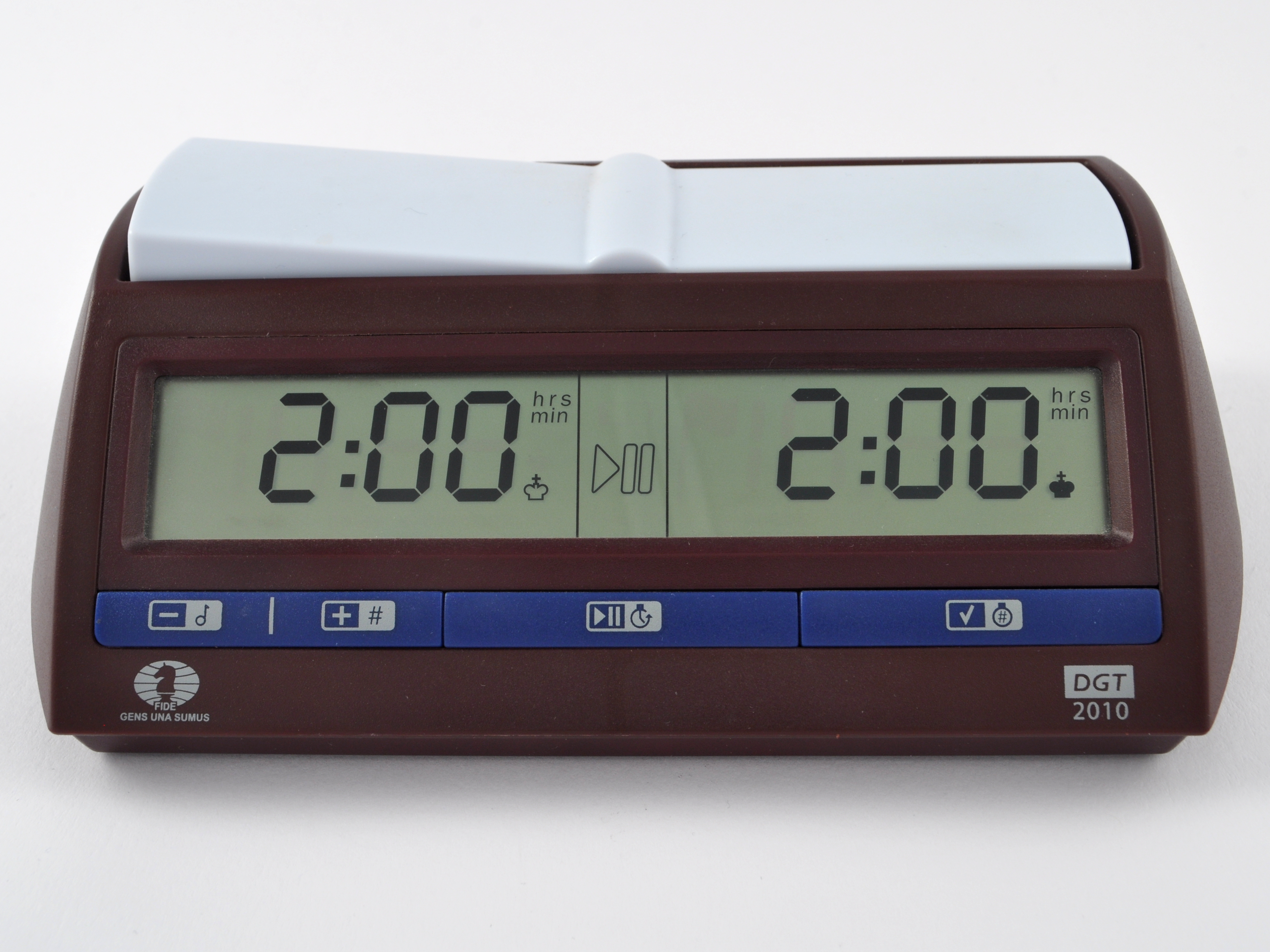
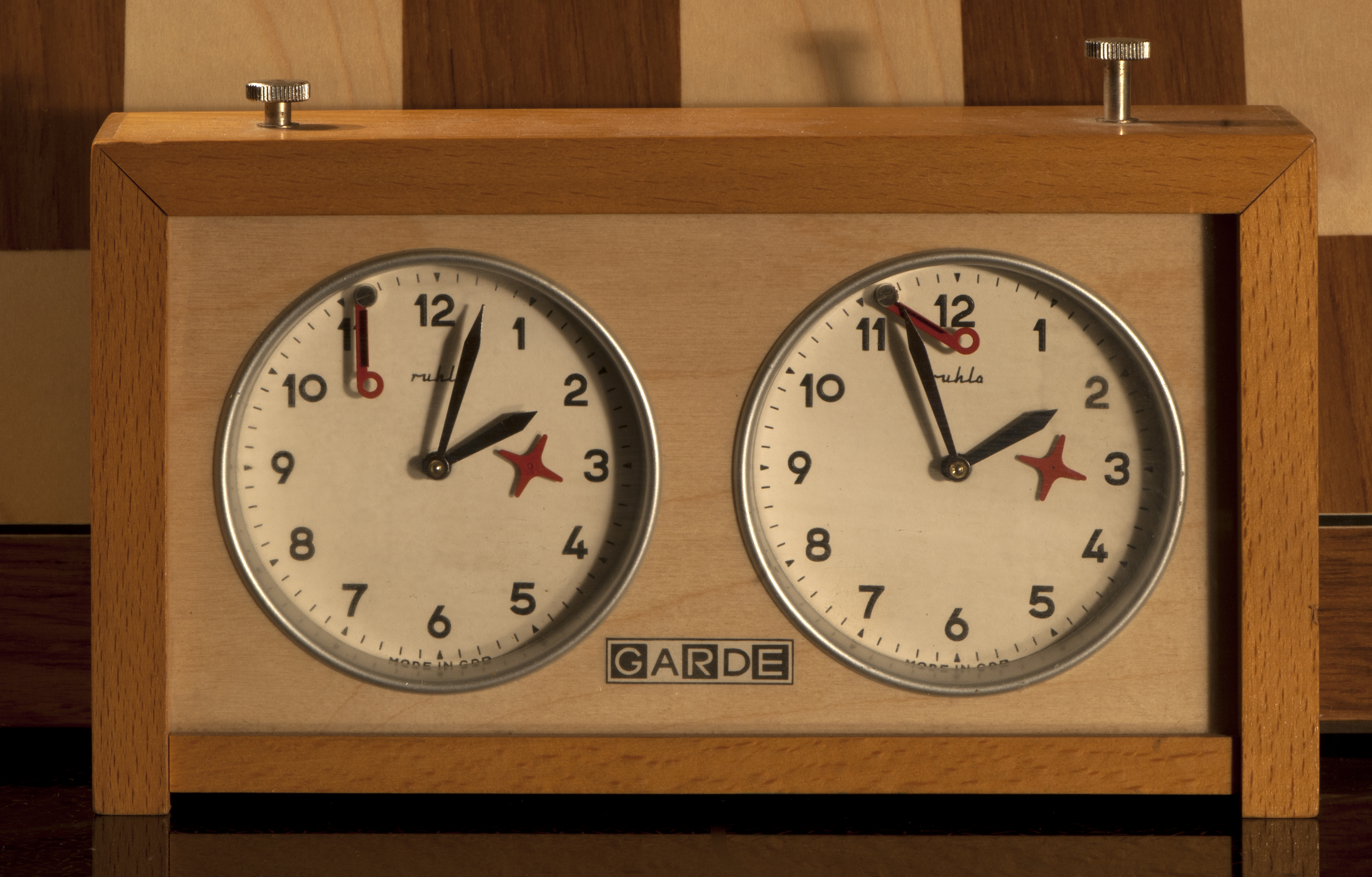
Typical digital and analog chess clocks

Time is controlled using a chess clock with two displays, one for each player's remaining time. Analog chess clocks have been largely replaced by digital clocks, which allow for time controls with increments.

There are some aspects unique to online chess. A premove allows a player to submit a move on the opponent's turn, which gets played automatically if possible using little to no time. Premoves, alongside the relative ease of digital inputs, make faster time controls feasible online.

Time controls are also enforced in correspondence chess competitions. A typical time control is 50 days for every 10 moves. Time is usually allotted per move in online correspondence chess.

=== Handicaps ===
Handicaps (or odds) in chess are setup or rule modifications which enable a weaker player to have a higher chance of winning against a stronger one. There are a variety of such handicaps, such as material odds (the stronger player surrenders a certain piece or pieces), extra moves (the weaker player has an agreed number of moves at the beginning of the game), extra time on the chess clock, and special conditions (such as requiring the odds-giver to deliver checkmate with a specified piece or pawn). Various permutations of these, such as pawn and two moves, are also possible.

Handicaps were quite popular in the 18th and 19th centuries, when chess was often played for money stakes, in order to induce weaker players to play for wagers. Today handicaps are rarely seen in serious competition outside of human–computer chess matches. As chess engines have been routinely superior to even chess masters since the late 20th century, human players need considerable odds to have practical chances in such matches – as of 2024, approximately knight odds for grandmasters.

== Notation ==
Historically, many different notation systems have been used to record chess moves; the standard system today is short-form algebraic notation. (Note: See paragraph "C. Algebraic notation" in FIDE Laws of Chess) In this system, files are labeled a through h and ranks are labeled 1 through 8. Squares are identified by the file and rank they occur on; "g3" is the square on the g-file and the third rank. In English, the piece notations are: K (king), Q (queen), R (rook), B (bishop), and N (knight; N is used to avoid confusion with king). Different initials are used in other languages. Moves are recorded as follows:

notation of piece moved – destination square

Square names in algebraic chess notation

For example, Qg5 means "queen moves to g5". Pawns have no letter initials; e4 simply means "pawn moves to e4". When multiple moves could be rendered the same way, the file or rank from which the piece moved is added to resolve ambiguity (e.g. Ngf3 means "knight from the g-file moves to the square f3"; R1e2 means "rook on the first rank moves to e2"). If a move may be disambiguated by rank or file, it is done by file, and in the rare case that both are needed, squares are listed normally (e.g. Qh4xe1).

If the move is a capture, "x" is usually inserted before the destination square, thus Bxf3 means "bishop captures on f3". When a pawn makes a capture, the file from which the pawn departed is often listed even when no disambiguation is necessary; for example, exd5 ("pawn on the e-file captures on d5").

If a pawn moves to its last rank, achieving promotion, the piece chosen is indicated after the move (for example, e1=Q or e1Q). Castling is indicated by the special notations 0-0 for kingside castling and 0-0-0 for queenside castling. A move that places the opponent's king in check usually has the notation "+" suffixed. Checkmate can be indicated by suffixing "#". At the end of the game, "1–0" means White won, "0–1" means Black won, and "½–½" indicates a draw. Chess moves can be annotated with punctuation marks and other symbols. For example: "!" indicates a good move; "!!" an excellent move; "?" a mistake; "??" a blunder; "!?" an interesting move that may not be best; or "?!" a dubious move not easily refuted.

"Scholar's mate"

Moves are written as White/Black pairs, preceded by the move number and a period. Individual moves by White are also recorded this way, while moves by Black are written with an ellipsis after the move number. For example, one variation of a simple trap known as the Scholar's mate (see animated diagram) can be recorded:

1.e4 e5 2.Qh5?! Nc6 3.Bc4 Nf6?? 4.Qxf7#

The move 3...Nf6?? is recorded as a blunder, as it allows 4.Qxf7 checkmate.

Games or sequences may be recorded in Portable Game Notation (PGN), a text-based format with support for annotative symbols, commentary, and background information, such as player names. It is based on short form English algebraic notation incorporating markup language. PGN transcripts, stored digitally as PGN (.pgn) files can be processed by most chess software and are easily readable by humans.

Variants of algebraic notation include long algebraic, in which both the departure and destination square are indicated; abbreviated algebraic, in which capture signs, check signs, and ranks of pawn captures may be omitted; and figurine algebraic notation, used in chess books and magazines, which uses graphic symbols instead of initials to indicate pieces for readability regardless of language.

Until about 1980, the majority of English language chess publications used descriptive notation, in which files are identified by the initial letter of the piece that occupies the first rank at the beginning of the game. In descriptive notation, the common opening move 1.e4 is rendered as "1.P-K4" ("pawn to king four"). Another system, ICCF numeric notation, is recognized by the International Correspondence Chess Federation.

In tournament games, players are normally required to keep a score (written record of the game). This is a requirement in all FIDE-sanctioned games played at classical time controls. For this purpose, only algebraic notation is recognized by FIDE, though variants such as long algebraic are acceptable; game scores recorded in a different notation system may not be used as evidence in the event of a dispute.

== Gameplay ==
=== Phases ===
Chess theory divides chess games into three phases with different sets of strategies: the opening, the middlegame, and lastly the endgame. There is no universally accepted way to delineate the three phases of the game; the middlegame is typically considered to have begun after 10–20 moves, and the endgame when only a few pieces remain.

==== Opening ====
Position: a8 black rook, b8 black knight, c8 black bishop, d8 black queen, e8 black king, f8 black bishop, h8 black rook, b7 black pawn, e7 black pawn, f7 black pawn, g7 black pawn, h7 black pawn, a6 black pawn, d6 black pawn, f6 black knight, d4 white knight, e4 white pawn, c3 white knight, a2 white pawn, b2 white pawn, c2 white pawn, f2 white pawn, g2 white pawn, h2 white pawn, a1 white rook, c1 white bishop, d1 white queen, e1 white king, f1 white bishop, h1 white rook

The Najdorf Variation (5...a6), a popular line of the Sicilian Defense (1...c5), itself a response to White's 1.e4

Competitive players typically learn, memorize, and play well-documented sequences of opening moves. The most common starting moves for White are 1.e4 and 1.d4, which usually lead to substantially different types of positions, and Black has multiple viable responses to both.

Sequences of opening moves are referred to as openings and are catalogued in reference works, such as the Encyclopaedia of Chess Openings. There are thousands of openings, though only a small fraction of them are commonly played; variations of openings may also be given names. Openings vary widely in character from quiet positional play (for example, the Colle System) to sharp aggressive play (like the Latvian Gambit). In some opening lines, the exact sequence considered best for both sides has been worked out to more than 30 moves.

The fundamental strategic aims of most openings are similar:

- Development: moving pieces (particularly bishops and knights) forward to squares on which they are useful (defending, attacking, and controlling important squares) or have the potential to take part in future plans and ideas.
- Control of the center: control of the central squares allows pieces to be moved to any part of the board relatively easily, and can inhibit the mobility of the opponent's pieces.
- King safety: typically secured by castling; incorrectly timed castling can be wasteful or even harmful, however.
- Pawn structure: players strive to avoid the creation of pawn weaknesses such as isolated, doubled, or backward pawns—and to force such weaknesses in the opponent's position.

Most players and theoreticians consider that White, by virtue of the initiative granted from moving first, begins the game with a small advantage. Black usually strives to neutralize White's advantage and achieve equality, or to develop dynamic counterplay in an unbalanced position.

==== Middlegame ====
The middlegame is the part of the game that starts after the opening. Because the opening theory has ended, players have to form plans based on the features of the position, and at the same time take into account the tactical possibilities of the position. The middlegame is the phase in which most combinations occur. Combinations are a series of tactical moves executed to achieve some gain. Middlegame combinations are often connected with an attack against the opponent's king. Some typical patterns have their own names; for example, the Boden's Mate or the Lasker–Bauer combination.

Specific plans or strategic themes will often arise from particular groups of openings that result in a specific type of pawn structure. An example is the minority attack, which is the attack of queenside pawns against an opponent who has more pawns on the queenside. The study of openings is therefore connected to the preparation of plans that are typical of the resulting middlegames.

Another important strategic question in the middlegame is whether and how to reduce material and transition into an endgame (i.e. simplify). Minor material advantages can generally be transformed into victory only in an endgame, and therefore the stronger side must choose an appropriate way to achieve an ending. Not every reduction of material is good for this purpose; for example, if one side keeps a light-squared bishop and the opponent has a dark-squared one, the transformation into a bishops and pawns ending is usually advantageous for the weaker side only, because an endgame with bishops on opposite colors is likely to be a draw, even with an advantage of a pawn, or sometimes even with a two-pawn advantage.

==== Endgame ====
Example of mutual zugzwang

Position: c8 black king, c7 white pawn, d6 white king

The side to move is disadvantaged.

The endgame (also end game or ending) is the stage of the game when there are few pieces left on the board. There are four main strategic differences between earlier stages of the game and the endgame:

- Pawns become more important. Endgames often revolve around endeavors to promote a pawn by advancing it to the furthest rank.
- The king, which requires safeguarding from attack during the middlegame, emerges as a strong piece in the endgame. It is often used to protect its own pawns, attack enemy pawns, and hinder moves of the opponent's king.
- Stalemates are much more common, as the few pieces remaining for a player may run out of moves. Stalemate is sometimes accidentally reached by newer players who end up restricting all of their opponent's possible moves.
- Zugzwang, a situation in which the player who is to move is forced to incur a disadvantage, is often a factor in endgames but rarely in other stages of the game. In the example diagram, either side having the move is in zugzwang: Black to move must play 1...Kb7 allowing White to promote the pawn after 2.Kd7; White to move must permit a draw, either by 1.Kc6 stalemate or by losing the pawn after any other legal move.

Endgames can be classified according to the type of pieces remaining on the board. Basic checkmates are positions in which one side has only a king and the other side has one or two pieces and can checkmate the opposing king, with the pieces working together with their king. For example, king and pawn endgames involve only kings and pawns on one or both sides, and the task of the stronger side is to promote one of the pawns. Other more complicated endings are classified according to pieces on the board other than kings, such as "rook and pawn versus rook" endgames.

=== Strategy ===
Example of underlying pawn structure

Position: a8 black rook, c8 black bishop, e8 black rook, g8 black king, a7 black pawn, b7 black pawn, d7 black knight, f7 black pawn, g7 black bishop, h7 black pawn, c6 black pawn, d6 white rook, f6 black knight, g6 black pawn, e5 black pawn, c4 white pawn, e4 white pawn, c3 white knight, e3 white bishop, f3 white knight, h3 white pawn, a2 white pawn, b2 white pawn, f2 white pawn, g2 white pawn, c1 white king, f1 white bishop, h1 white rook

Position after 12...Re8 ...
Tarrasch vs. Euwe, Bad Pistyan (1922)

Position: a7 black pawn, b7 black pawn, f7 black pawn, h7 black pawn, c6 black pawn, g6 black pawn, e5 black pawn, c4 white pawn, e4 white pawn, h3 white pawn, a2 white pawn, b2 white pawn, f2 white pawn, g2 white pawn

... and its pawn structure, known as the Rauzer formation

Chess strategy is concerned with the evaluation of chess positions and with setting up goals and long-term plans for future play. During the evaluation, players must take into account numerous factors such as the value of the pieces on the board, control of the center and centralization, the pawn structure, king safety, and the control of key squares or groups of squares (for example, diagonals, open files, and dark or light squares).

The most basic step in evaluating a position is to count the total value of pieces of both sides. The point values used for this purpose are based on experience; pawns are worth one point, knights and bishops about three points each, rooks about five points (the value difference between a rook and a bishop or knight being known as the exchange), and queens about nine points. The king is more valuable than all of the other pieces combined, since its checkmate loses the game, but is still capable as a fighting piece; in the endgame, the king is generally more powerful than a bishop or knight but less powerful than a rook. These basic values are then modified by other factors like position of the piece (e.g. advanced pawns are usually more valuable than those on their initial squares), coordination between pieces (e.g. a pair of bishops usually coordinate better than a bishop and a knight), or the type of position (e.g. knights are generally better in closed positions with many pawns while bishops are more powerful in open positions).

Another important factor in the evaluation of chess positions is pawn structure (sometimes known as the pawn skeleton): the configuration of pawns on the chessboard. Since pawns are the least mobile of the pieces, pawn structure is relatively static and largely determines the strategic nature of the position. Weaknesses in pawn structure include isolated, doubled, or backward pawns and holes; once created, they are often permanent. Care must therefore be taken to avoid these weaknesses unless they are compensated by another valuable asset (for example, by the possibility of developing an attack).

=== Tactics ===
In chess, tactics generally refer to short-term maneuvers—so short-term that they can be calculated in advance by a human player. The possible depth of calculation depends on the player's ability. In quiet positions with many possibilities on both sides, a deep calculation is more difficult and may not be practical, while in positions with a limited number of forced variations, strong players can calculate long sequences of moves.

Theoreticians describe many elementary tactical methods and typical maneuvers, for example: pins, forks, skewers, batteries, discovered attacks (especially discovered checks), zwischenzugs, deflections, decoys, sacrifices, underminings, overloadings, and interferences. Simple one-move or two-move tactical actions—threats, exchanges of material, and double attacks—can be combined into longer sequences of tactical maneuvers that are often forced from the point of view of one or both players. A forced variation that involves a sacrifice and usually results in a tangible gain is called a combination. Brilliant combinations, such as those in the Immortal Game, are considered beautiful and are admired by chess lovers.

A common type of chess exercise, aimed at developing players' tactical skills, is a position where a combination is available and the challenge is to find it. Such positions are usually handcrafted, taken from actual games or from analysis of actual games. Solutions usually result in checkmate, decisive advantage, or successful defense. Tactical exercises are commonly found in instructional books, chess magazines, newspaper chess columns, and internet chess sites.

== Problems and studies ==
Samuel Loyd
New York State Chess Association, 1892

Position: c8 black queen, g8 black knight, g7 black knight, h7 white king, d6 black pawn, f6 black rook, g6 white pawn, e5 white pawn, g5 black pawn, c4 black pawn, d4 black king, h4 black pawn, a3 white queen, e3 white rook, c2 white pawn, d2 white knight, f2 white rook, g2 white bishop, h2 white bishop, b1 black bishop, c1 black rook, d1 white knight

White to play and mate in 2

Chess problems (also called chess compositions) are composed positions, usually created for artistic effect rather than practical application. This is a specialized field with its own distinctive terminology and culture. The creator is known as a chess composer. There are many types of chess problems, the most common being directmates, in which White is required to move and checkmate Black within a specified number of moves, usually two or three, against any defense.

These are commonly referred to as "two-movers", "three-movers", or "more-movers". "Many-movers" (also known as "long-range problems") of over 100 moves have been composed, the current record standing at over 200; these usually require repetitions of the same maneuver in order to produce a repeated zugzwang and force detrimental pawn advances.

Directmate positions are usually highly unlikely to occur in an actual game, and are intended to illustrate a particular theme, usually requiring a surprising or counterintuitive key move. Themes associated with chess problems occasionally appear in actual games, when they are referred to as "problem-like" moves. An example of a two-mover is shown in the diagram.

Other common types of problems include:

- Helpmates, in which Black moves first and cooperates with White to get Black's king checkmated
- Selfmates, in which White moves first and forces Black to checkmate White
- Retrograde analysis problems, in which the solver is required to work out what has previously occurred in the game, for example to prove that castling is illegal in the current position

The above type of problems are usually considered orthodox, in the sense that the standard rules of chess are observed.

Fairy chess problems, also called heterodox problems, involve altered rules, such as the use of unconventional pieces or boards, or stipulations that contradict the standard rules of chess such as reflexmates or seriesmovers.

Richard Réti
Ostrauer Morgenzeitung, 1921

Position: h8 white king, a6 black king, c6 white pawn, h5 black pawn

White to move and draw
This endgame study is solved by the white king's diagonal moves (1.Kg7, 2.Kf6, 3.Ke5), creating simultaneous threats of capturing the black pawn and supporting the white pawn on its way to queen.

Studies are usually considered distinct from problems, although there is some overlap. In a study, the stipulation is that White to play must win or draw, without specifying any particular number of moves. The majority of studies are endgame positions, with varying degrees of realism or practical application.

Both problems and studies are distinct from puzzles, in which realistic positions are presented, usually taken from actual games or analysis, and the reader is tasked with finding the win (or occasionally draw), usually involving a tactical motif. Such puzzles are a common feature of chess magazines and websites, and are intended to help players develop their tactical skills.

Tournaments for composition and solving of chess problems and studies are organized by the World Federation for Chess Composition (WFCC), which works cooperatively with but independently of FIDE. The WFCC awards titles for composing and solving chess problems.

== Chess in public spaces ==
Chess is often played in public spaces such as parks and town squares. Although the nature of these games is often casual, the chess hustling scene has seen growth in urban areas such as New York City.

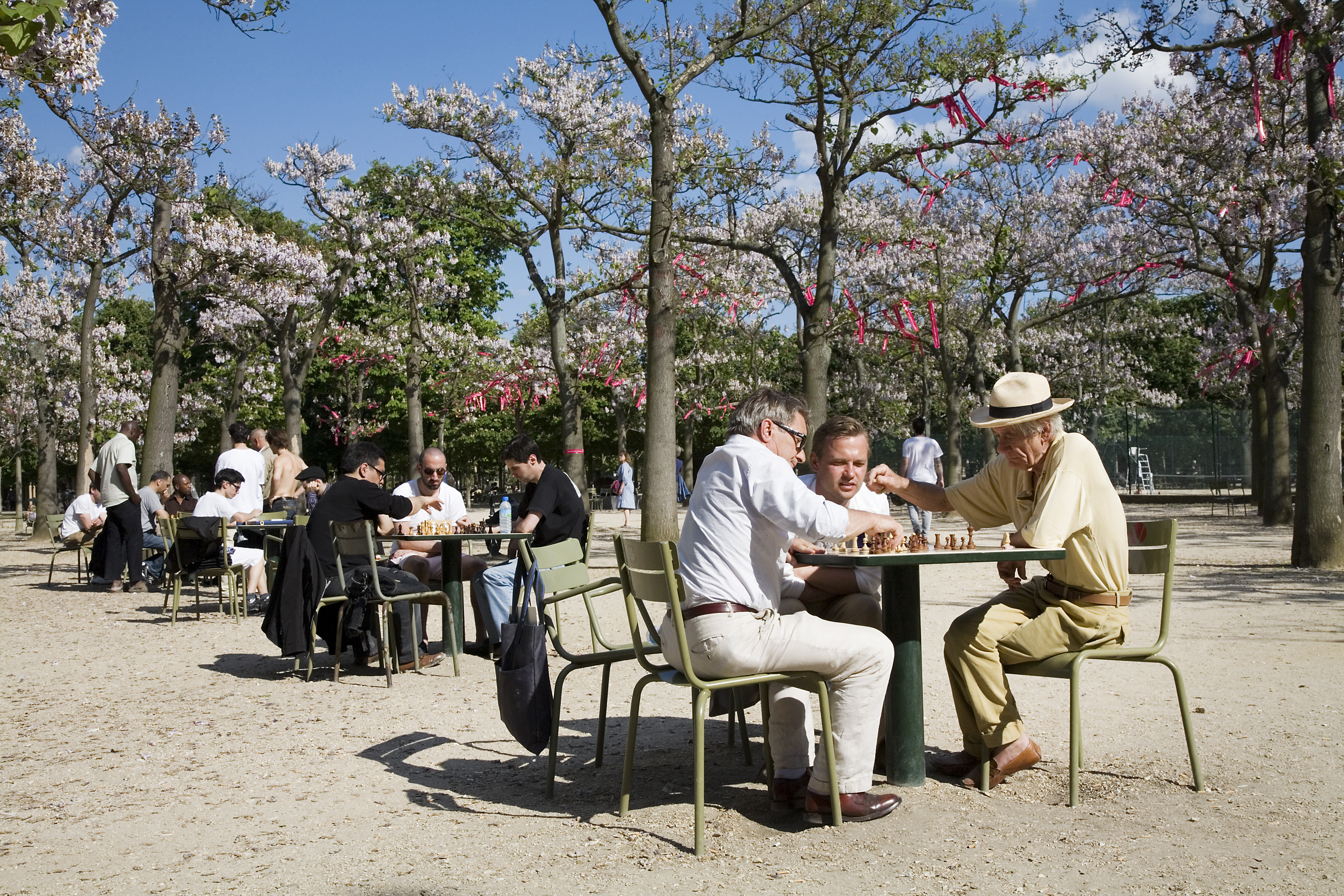
Public chess tables in the Jardin du Luxembourg, Paris, France

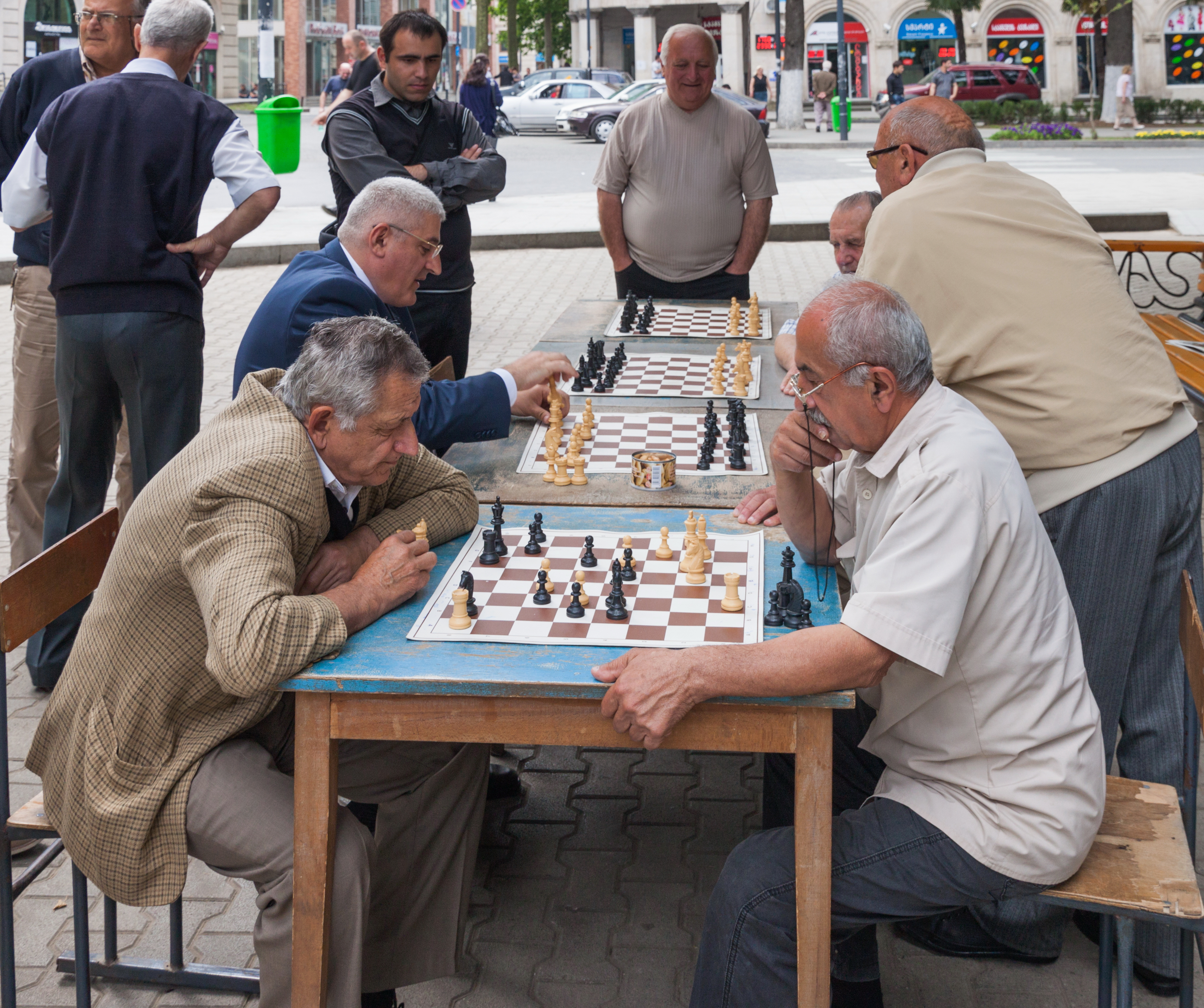
Men playing chess, Kutaisi, Georgia, 2014

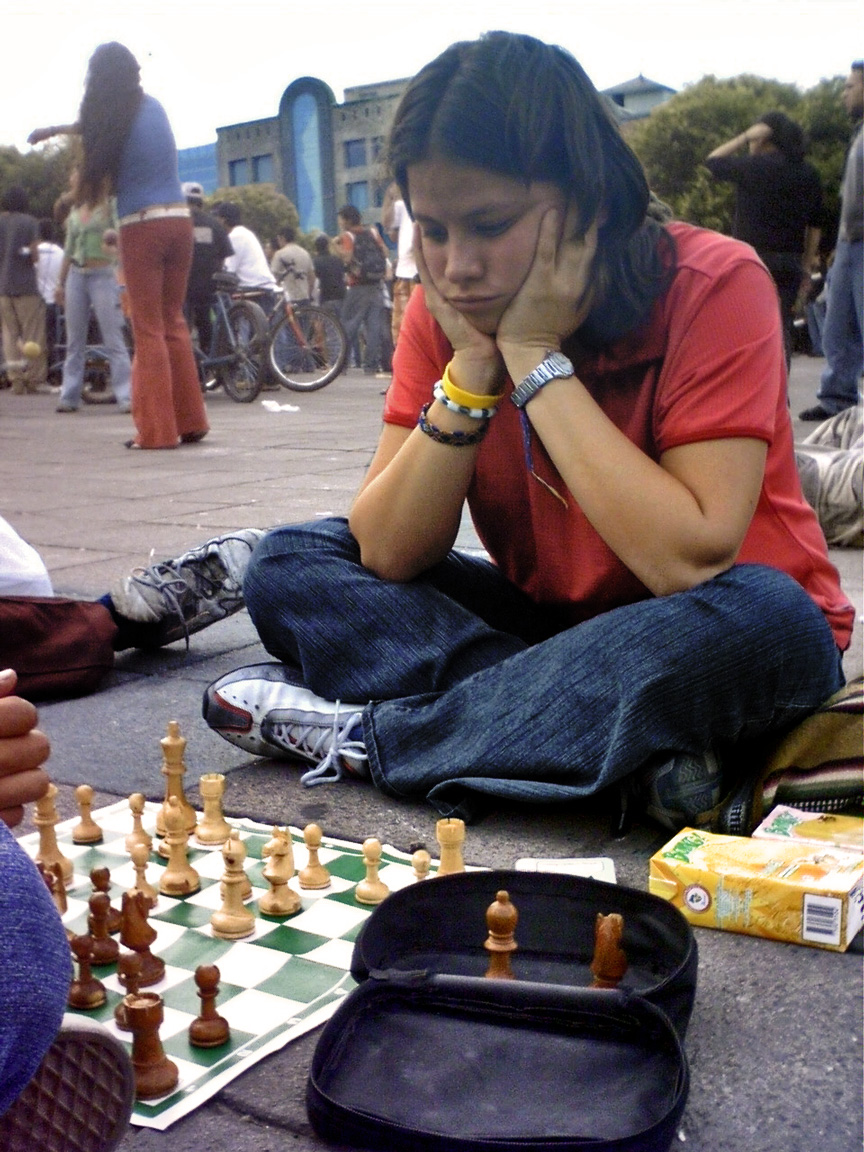
A girl playing chess in Mexico City, Mexico

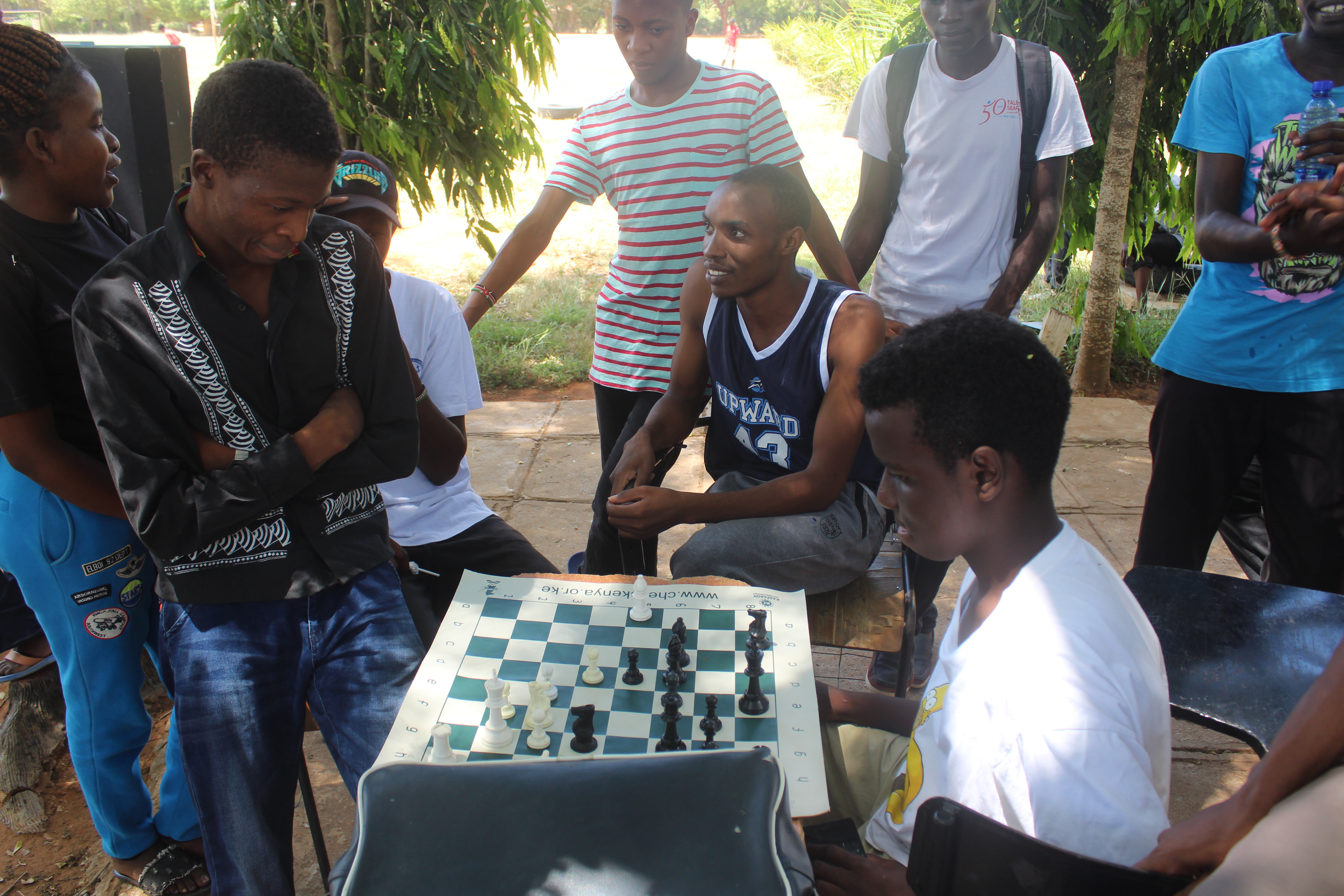
Chess game in Kilifi, Kenya

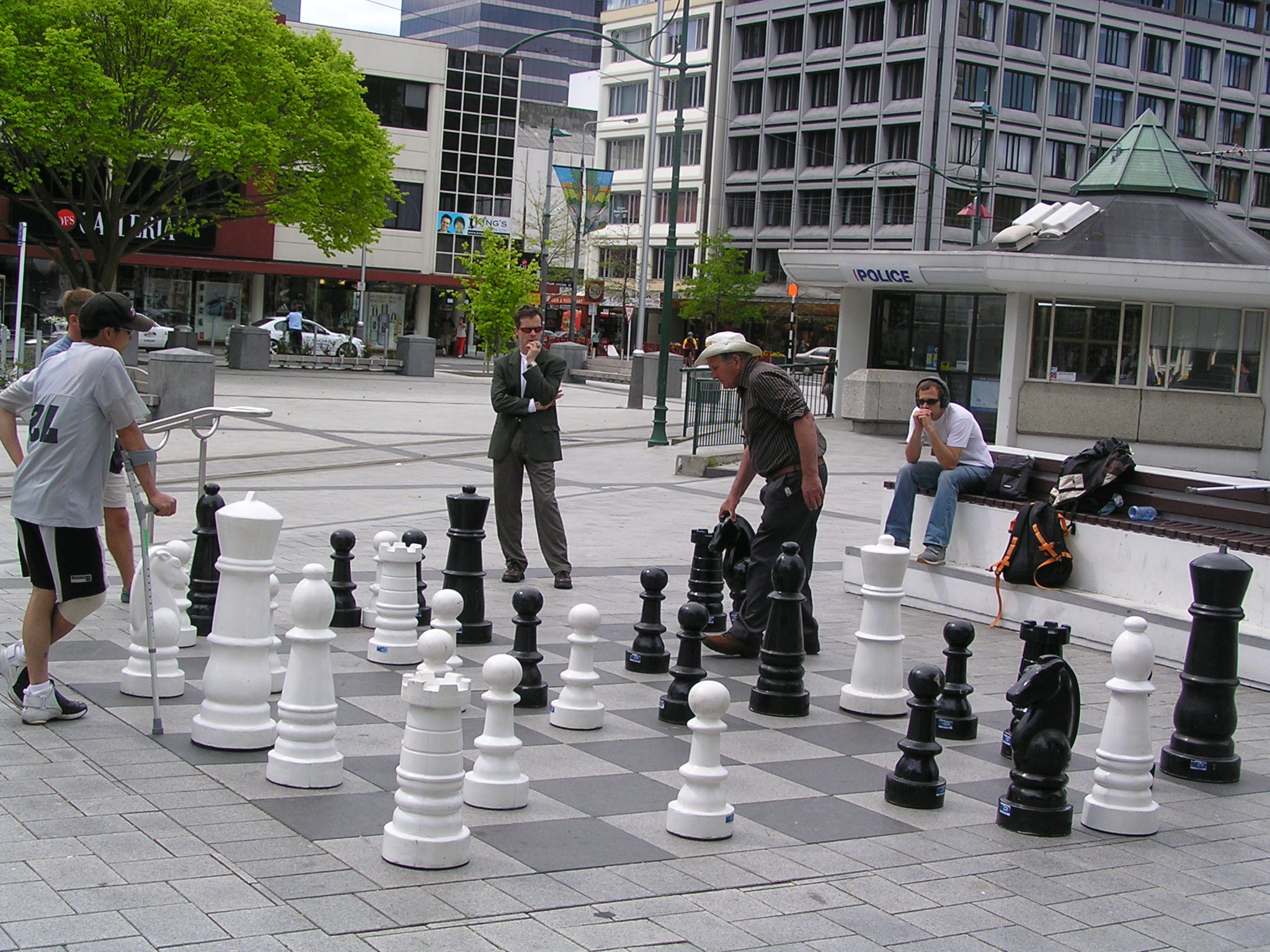
Giant chess in Cathedral Square, Christchurch, New Zealand, 2005

== Online chess ==
Online chess is chess played over the internet. This is done through the use of internet chess platforms, which use Elo ratings or similar systems to pair up individual players. Online chess saw a spike in growth during the quarantines of the COVID-19 pandemic. This can be attributed to both isolation and the popularity of Netflix miniseries The Queen's Gambit, which was released in October 2020. Chess app downloads on the App Store and Google Play Store rose by 63% after the show debuted. Chess.com saw more than twice as many account registrations in November as it had in previous months, and the number of games played monthly on Lichess doubled as well. There was also a demographic shift in players, with female registration on Chess.com shifting from 22% to 27% of new players. GM Maurice Ashley said "A boom is taking place in chess like we have never seen maybe since the Bobby Fischer days", attributing the growth to an increased desire to do something constructive during the pandemic. Former USCF Women's Program Director Jennifer Shahade stated that chess works well on the internet, since pieces do not need to be reset and matchmaking is virtually instant.

== Computer chess ==
The idea of creating a chess-playing machine dates to the 18th century; around 1769, the chess-playing automaton called The Turk became famous before being exposed as a hoax. Serious trials based on automata, such as El Ajedrecista, were too complex and limited to be useful. Since the advent of the digital computer in the 1950s, chess enthusiasts, computer engineers, and computer scientists have built, with increasing degrees of seriousness and success, chess-playing machines and computer programs. The groundbreaking paper on computer chess, "Programming a Computer for Playing Chess", was published in 1950 by Claude Shannon. (Note: Alan Turing made an attempt in 1953.) He wrote:

The chess machine is an ideal one to start with, since: (1) the problem is sharply defined both in allowed operations (the moves) and in the ultimate goal (checkmate); (2) it is neither so simple as to be trivial nor too difficult for satisfactory solution; (3) chess is generally considered to require "thinking" for skillful play; a solution of this problem will force us either to admit the possibility of a mechanized thinking or to further restrict our concept of "thinking"; (4) the discrete structure of chess fits well into the digital nature of modern computers.

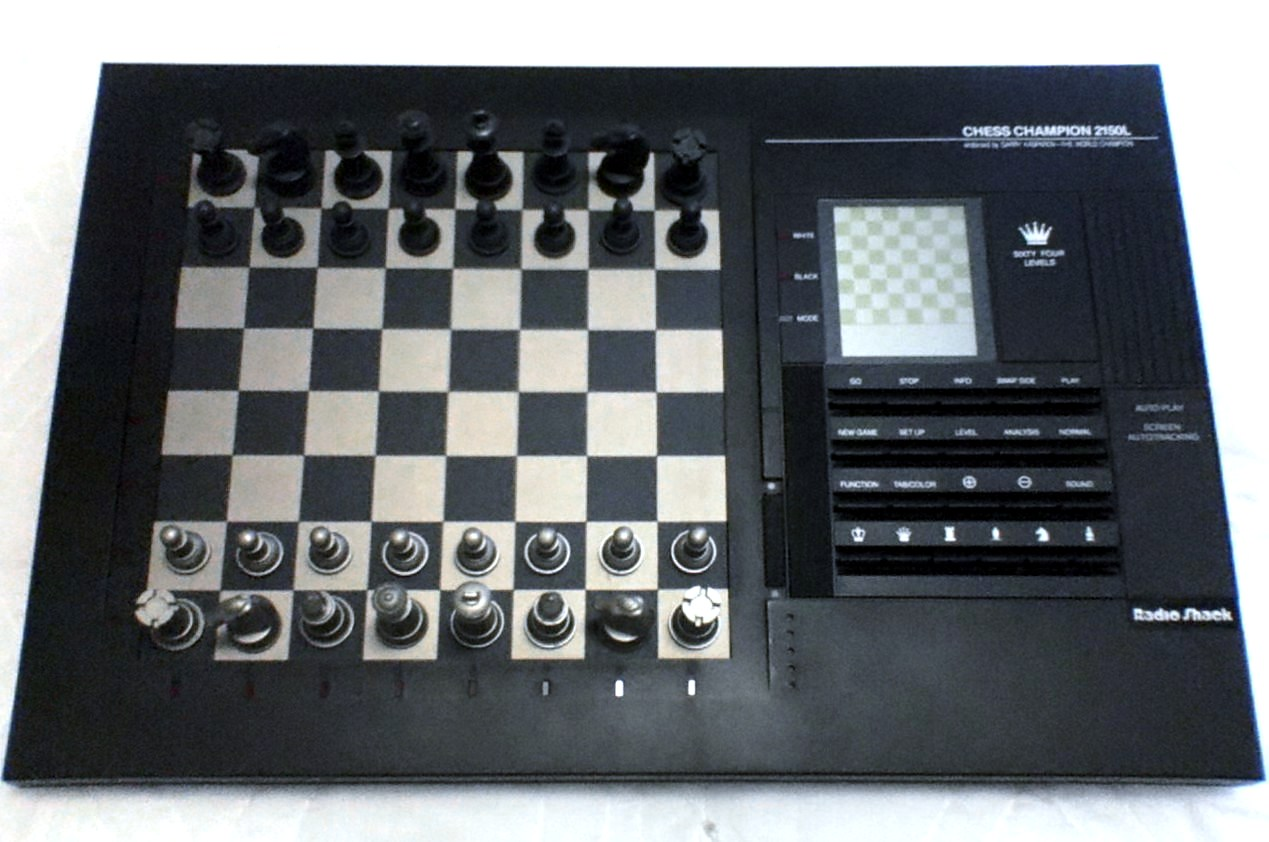
1990s chess-playing computer

The Association for Computing Machinery (ACM) held the first major chess tournament for computers, the North American Computer Chess Championship, in September 1970. CHESS 3.0, a chess program from Northwestern University, won the championship. The first World Computer Chess Championship, held in 1974, was won by the Soviet program Kaissa. At first considered only a curiosity, the best chess playing programs have become extremely strong. In 1997, a computer won a chess match using classical time controls against a reigning World Champion for the first time: IBM's Deep Blue beat Garry Kasparov 3½–2½ (it scored two wins, one loss, and three draws). There was some controversy over the match, and human–computer matches were relatively close over the next few years, until convincing computer victories in 2005 and in 2006.

In 2009, a mobile phone won a category 6 tournament with a performance rating of 2898: chess engine Hiarcs 13 running on the mobile phone HTC Touch HD won the Copa Mercosur tournament with nine wins and one draw. The best chess programs are now able to consistently beat the strongest human players, to the extent that human–computer matches no longer attract interest from chess players or the media. While the World Computer Chess Championship still exists, the Top Chess Engine Championship (TCEC) is widely regarded as the unofficial world championship for chess engines. The current champion is Stockfish.

With huge databases of past games and high analytical ability, computers can help players to learn chess and prepare for matches. Internet Chess Servers allow people to find and play opponents worldwide. The presence of computers and modern communication tools have raised concerns regarding cheating during games.

== Organized competition ==
=== Tournaments and matches ===
Contemporary chess is an organized sport with structured international and national leagues, tournaments, and congresses. Thousands of chess tournaments, matches, and festivals are held around the world every year catering to players of all levels.

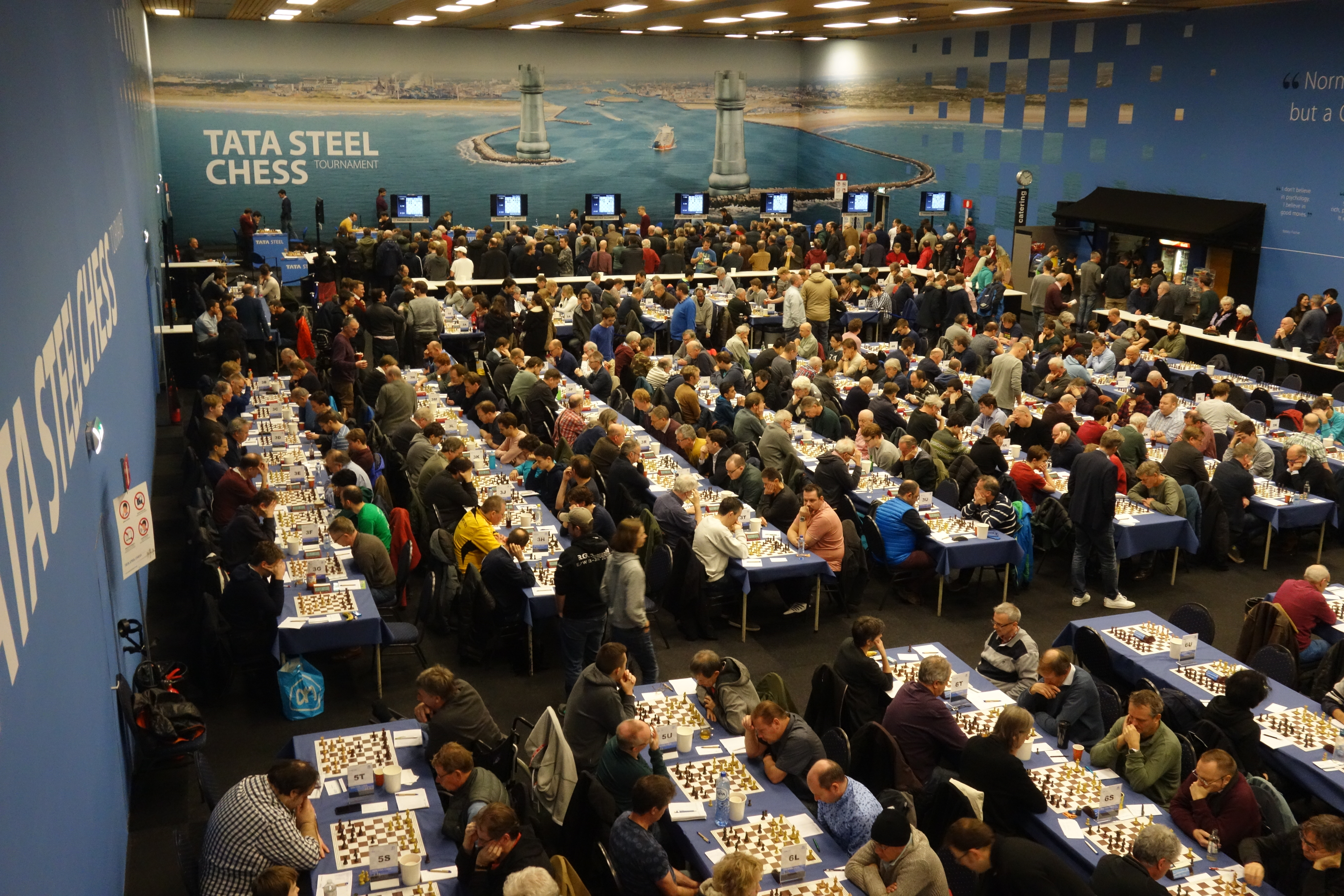
Tata Steel Chess Tournament 2019, Wijk aan Zee (the Netherlands)

Tournaments with a small number of players may use the round-robin format, in which every player plays one game against every other player. For a large number of players, the Swiss system may be used, in which each player is paired against an opponent who has the same (or as similar as possible) score in each round. A less common format is the Scheveningen system, in which two teams of equal size compete against each other, each player from one team playing each player from the other team. A few tournaments, such as the FIDE World Cup, are played as a series of knockout matches, in which players play a fixed number of games against each other, going to tiebreak if necessary, until a winner can be determined. Whatever the tournament format, a player's score is usually calculated as 1 point for each game won and ½ point for each game drawn. Variations such as "football scoring" (3 points for a win, 1 point for a draw) may be used by tournament organizers, but ratings are always calculated on the basis of standard scoring. A player's score may be reported as total score out of games played (e.g. 5½/8), points for versus points against (e.g. 5½–2½), or by number of wins, losses, and draws (e.g. +4−1=3).

The term "match" refers not to an individual game, but to either a series of games between two players, or a team competition in which each player of one team plays one game against a player of the other team.

=== Governance ===
Chess's international governing body is usually known by its French acronym FIDE (pronounced FEE-day; French: Fédération Internationale des Échecs), or International Chess Federation. FIDE's membership consists of the national chess organizations of over 180 countries; there are also several associate members, including various supra-national organizations, the International Braille Chess Association (IBCA), International Chess Committee of the Deaf (ICCD), and the International Physically Disabled Chess Association (IPCA). FIDE is recognized as a sports governing body by the International Olympic Committee, but chess has never been part of the Olympic Games.

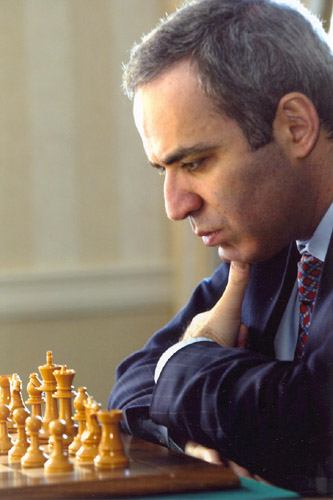
Garry Kasparov, former World Chess Champion

FIDE's most visible activity is organizing the World Chess Championship, a role it assumed in 1948. The current World Champion is Gukesh Dommaraju of India. The reigning Women's World Champion is Ju Wenjun from China.

Other competitions for individuals include the World Junior Chess Championship, the European Individual Chess Championship, the tournaments for the World Championship qualification cycle, and the various national championships. Invitation-only tournaments regularly attract the world's strongest players. Examples include Spain's Linares event, Monte Carlo's Melody Amber tournament, the Dortmund Sparkassen meeting, Sofia's M-tel Masters, and Wijk aan Zee's Tata Steel tournament.

Regular team chess events include the Chess Olympiad and the European Team Chess Championship.

Another important FIDE activity is administering the international FIDE rating list, calculated monthly using the Elo rating system. Whereas formerly the minimum rating for inclusion on the list was 2200 (master level), it has since been reduced to 1200, allowing a large number of amateur events to be FIDE rated. FIDE also maintains separate rapid and blitz rating lists.

The World Chess Solving Championship and World Correspondence Chess Championship include both team and individual events. These are held independently of FIDE by, respectively, the World Federation for Chess Composition (WFCC) and the International Correspondence Chess Federation (ICCF).

=== Titles and rankings ===
In order to rank players, FIDE, ICCF, and most national chess organizations use the Elo rating system developed by Arpad Elo. An average club player has a rating of about 1500. The highest FIDE rating of all time is 2882, which has been achieved by Magnus Carlsen twice, in May 2014 and August 2019.

Players may be awarded lifetime titles by FIDE: (Note: Section "01. International Title Regulations (Qualification Commission)" in FIDE Handbook)

- Grandmaster (GM) is the highest title a chess player can attain. For the GM title, a player must have had an Elo rating of 2500 or more at least once and must achieve three results of a prescribed standard (called norms) in tournaments involving other grandmasters, including some from countries other than the applicant's. There are other milestones that can substitute for norms, such as winning the World Junior Championship.
- International Master (IM). The conditions are similar to GM, but less demanding. The minimum rating for the IM title is 2400.
- FIDE Master (FM). The usual way for a player to qualify for the FIDE Master title is by achieving a FIDE rating of 2300 or more.
- Candidate Master (CM). Similar to FM, but with a FIDE rating of at least 2200.

The above titles are known as "open" titles, obtainable by both men and women. There are also separate women-only titles: Woman Grandmaster (WGM), Woman International Master (WIM), Woman FIDE Master (WFM) and Woman Candidate Master (WCM). These require a performance level approximately 200 rating points below their respective open titles. The continued existence of women-only titles has been debated; critics, including former world championship challenger Judit Polgár, have argued that separate titles are unnecessary and reinforce gender distinctions rather than competitive standards. Beginning with Nona Gaprindashvili in 1978, a number of women have earned the open GM title: 44 as of July 2026.

FIDE also awards titles for arbiters and trainers. (Note: Section "06. Regulations for the Titles of Arbiters" in FIDE Handbook) (Note: Section "07. Regulations for the Titles of Trainers" in FIDE Handbook) International titles are also awarded to composers and solvers of chess problems and to correspondence chess players (by the International Correspondence Chess Federation). National chess organizations may also award titles.

== History ==
=== Origins ===
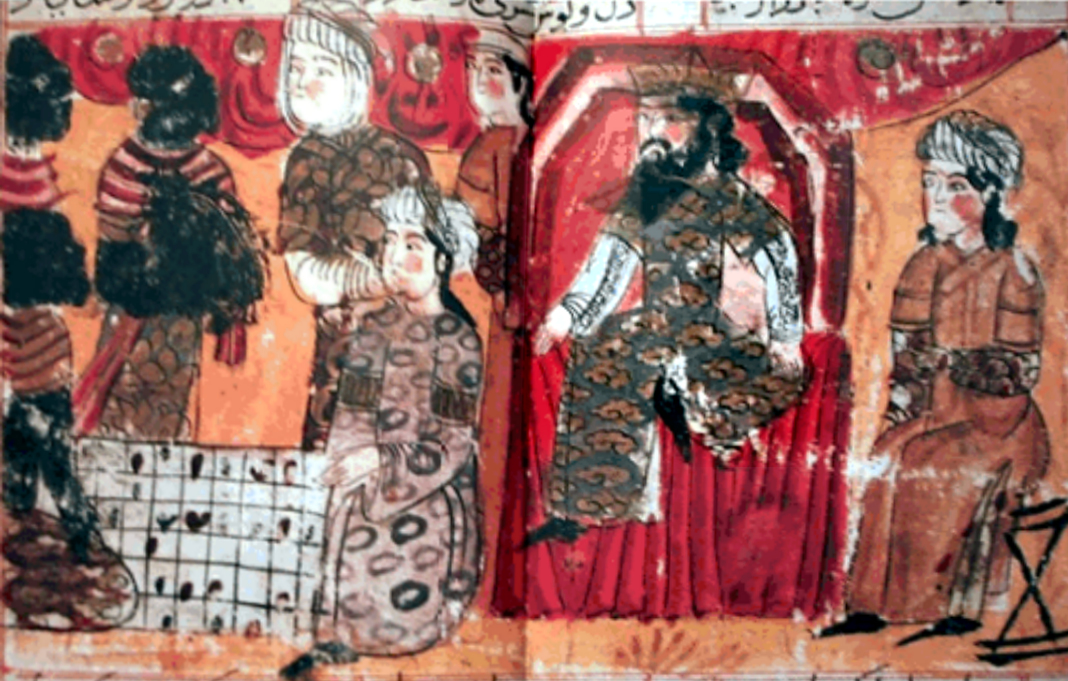
Sasanian Empire King Khosrow I sits on his throne before the chessboard, while his vizir and the Indian envoy Deva Sharma, probably sent by the Maukhari King Śarvavarman of Kannauj, are playing chess. Shahnama, 10th century AD.

Texts referring to the origins of chess date from the beginning of the seventh century. One, the "Harshacharita", is in Sanskrit. Three are written in "Pahlavi" (Middle Persian) One of these texts, the "Chatrang-namak", represents one of the earliest written accounts of chess. The narrator Bozorgmehr explains that "Chatrang", "Chess" in Pahlavi, was introduced to Persia by Dewasarm, a great ruler of India' during the reign of Khosrow I:

Dewasarm has fashioned this chatrang after the likeness of a battle, and in its likeness are two supreme rulers after the likeness of Kings (shah), with the essentials of rooks (rukh) to right and to left, with Counsellor (farzin) in the likeness of a commander of the champions, with the Elephant (pil) in the likeness of the commander of the rearguard, with Horse (asp) in the likeness of the commander of the cavalry, with the Footsoldier (piyadak) in the likeness of so many infantry in the vanguard of the battle.

— Translation by Murray, 1913.

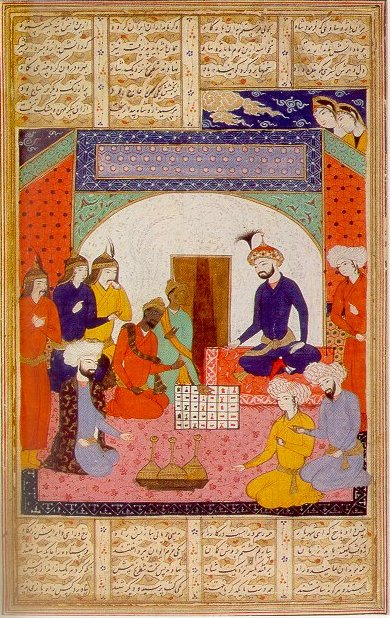
An illustration from a Persian manuscript "A treatise on chess". The Ambassadors from India present the Chatrang to Khosrow I Anushirwan, "Immortal Soul", King of Persia, 14th century AD.

The oldest known chess manual was in Arabic and dates to about 840, written by al-Adli ar-Rumi (800–870), a renowned Arab chess player, titled Kitab ash-shatranj (The Book of Chess). This is a lost manuscript, but is referenced in later works. Here also, al-Adli attributes the origins of Persian chess to India, along with the eighth-century collection of fables Kalīla wa-Dimna. By the 20th century, a substantial consensus developed regarding chess's origins in northwest India in the early seventh century. More recently, this consensus has been the subject of further scrutiny.

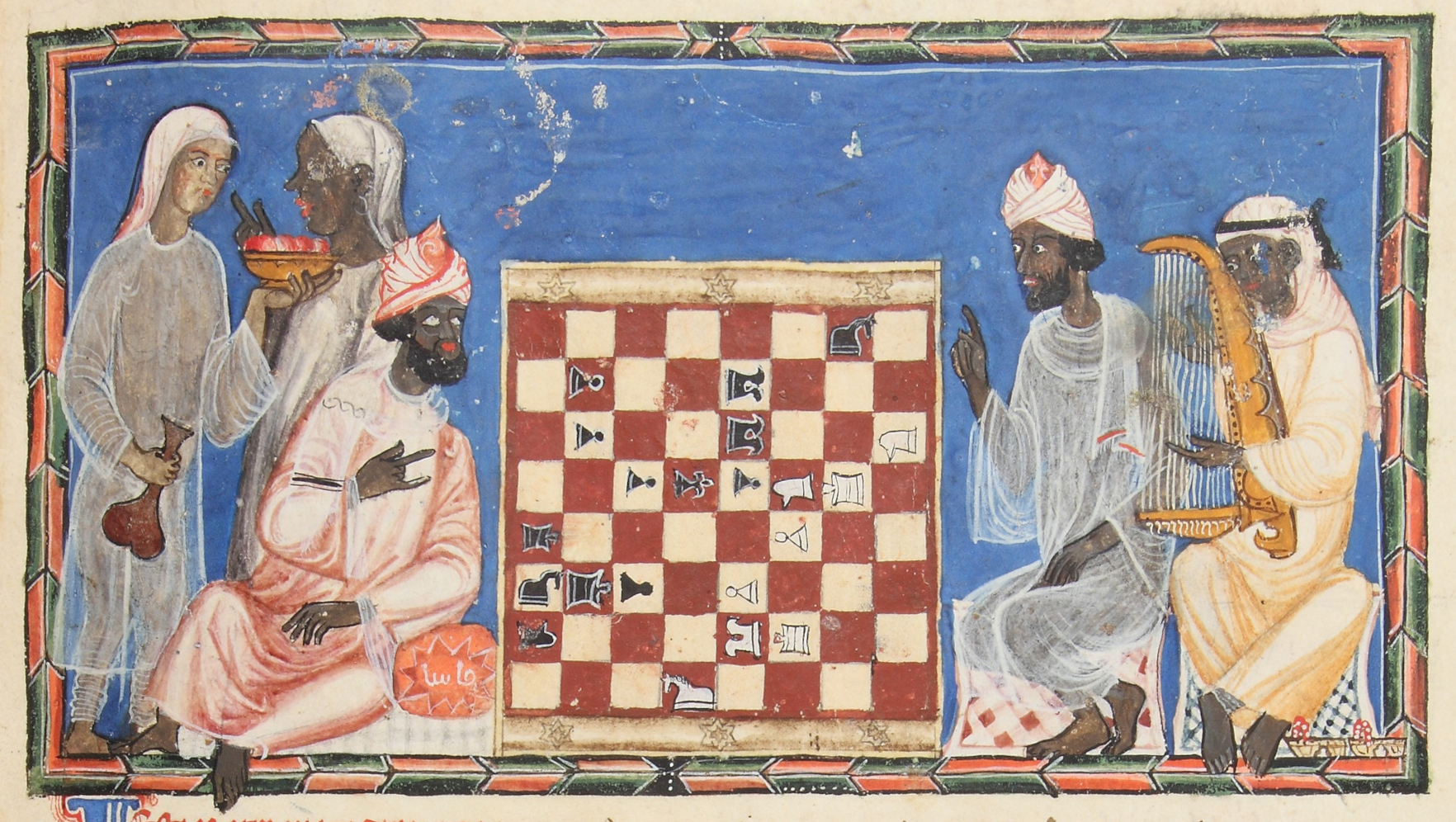
African Muslims playing chess; 1283 A.D. Miniature from Alfonso X's Book of chess, dice and boards

The early forms of chess in India were known as chaturaṅga (Sanskrit: चतुरङ्ग), literally "four divisions" [of the military] – infantry, cavalry, elephants, and chariotry – represented by pieces that would later evolve into the modern pawn, knight, bishop, and rook, respectively. Chaturanga was played on an 8×8 uncheckered board, called ashtāpada. Thence it spread eastward and westward along the Silk Road. The earliest evidence of chess is found in nearby Sasanian Persia around 600 A.D., where the game came to be known by the name chatrang (Persian: چترنگ). Chatrang was taken up by the Muslim world after the Islamic conquest of Persia (633–51), where it was then named shatranj (Arabic: شطرنج; Persian: شترنج), with the pieces largely retaining their Persian names. In Spanish, "shatranj" was rendered as ajedrez ("al-shatranj"), in Portuguese as xadrez, and in Greek as ζατρίκιον (zatrikion, which comes directly from the Persian chatrang), but in the rest of Europe it was replaced by versions of the Persian shāh ("king"), from which the English words "check" and "chess" descend. (Note: At that time the Spanish word would have been written axedrez. The Spanish "x" was pronounced as English "sh", as the Portuguese "x" still is today. The spelling of ajedrez changed after Spanish lost the "sh" sound.) The word "checkmate" is derived from the Persian shāh māt ("the king is dead").

Xiangqi is the form of chess best known in China. The eastern migration of chess, into China and Southeast Asia, has even less documentation than its migration west, making it largely conjectured. The word xiàngqí (象棋) was used in China to refer to a game from 569 A.D. at the latest, but it has not been proven that this game was directly related to chess. The first reference to Chinese chess appears in a book entitled Xuánguaì Lù (玄怪錄; "Record of the Mysterious and Strange"), dating to about 800. A minority view holds that Western chess arose from xiàngqí or one of its predecessors. Chess historians Jean-Louis Cazaux and Rick Knowlton contend that xiangqi's intrinsic characteristics make it easier to construct an evolutionary path from China to India/Persia than the opposite direction.

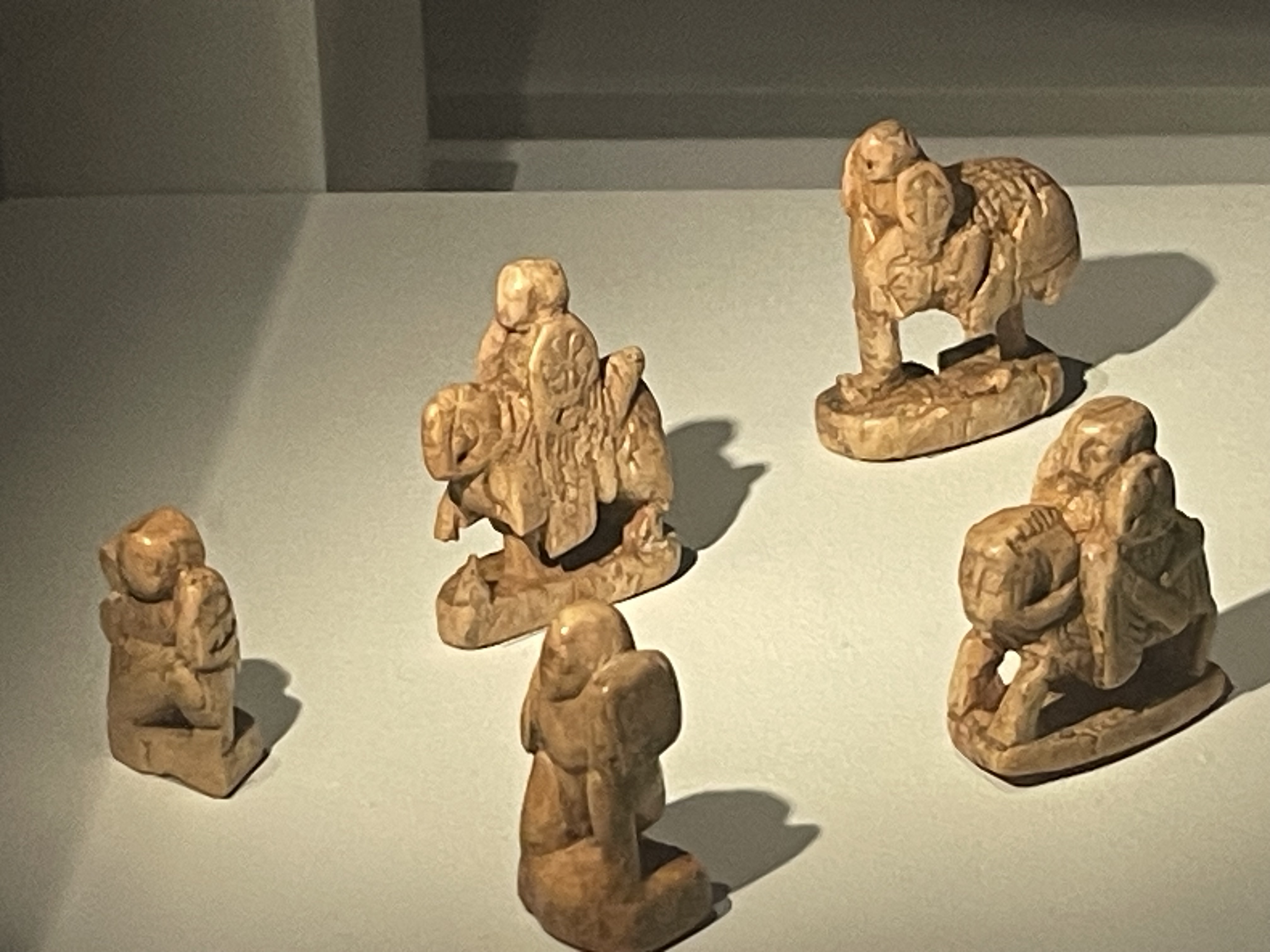
Some of the seven Early Islamic chess pieces excavated in Samarkand in 1977, dating to the 700s and among the oldest in the world. The ivory came from India.

The oldest archaeological chess artifacts – ivory pieces – were excavated in ancient Afrasiab, today's Samarkand, in Uzbekistan, Central Asia, and date to about 760, with some of them possibly being older. Remarkably, almost all findings of the oldest pieces come from along the Silk Road, from the former regions of the Tarim Basin (today's Xinjiang in China), Transoxiana, Sogdiana, Bactria, Gandhara, to Iran on one end and to India through Kashmir on the other.

The game reached Western Europe and Russia via at least three routes, the earliest being in the ninth century. By the year 1000, it had spread throughout both the Muslim Iberia and Latin Europe. A Latin poem called Versus de scachis ("Verses on Chess") dated to the late 10th century, has been preserved at Einsiedeln Abbey in Switzerland.

=== 1200–1700: Origins of the modern game ===
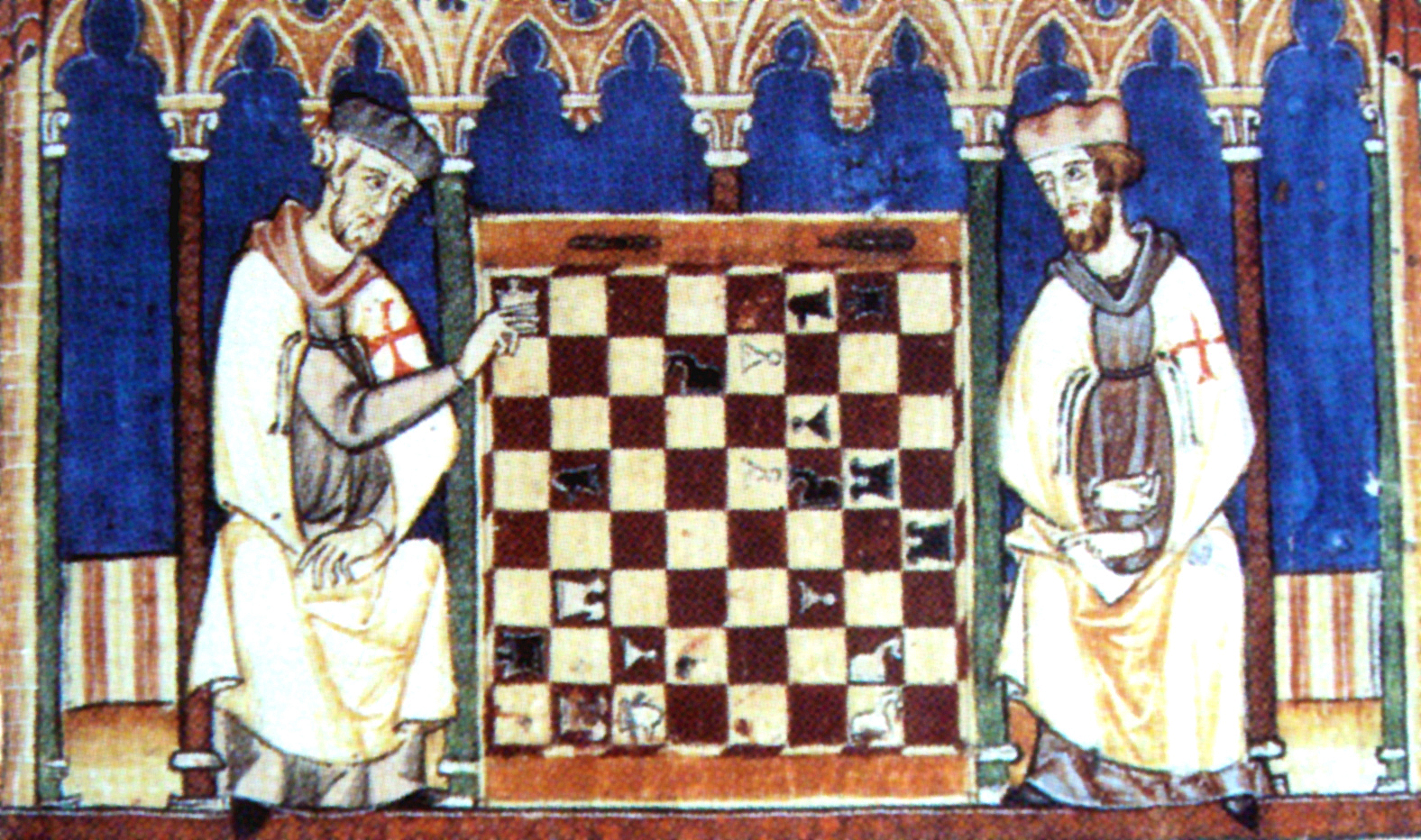
Knights Templar playing chess, Libro de los juegos, 1283

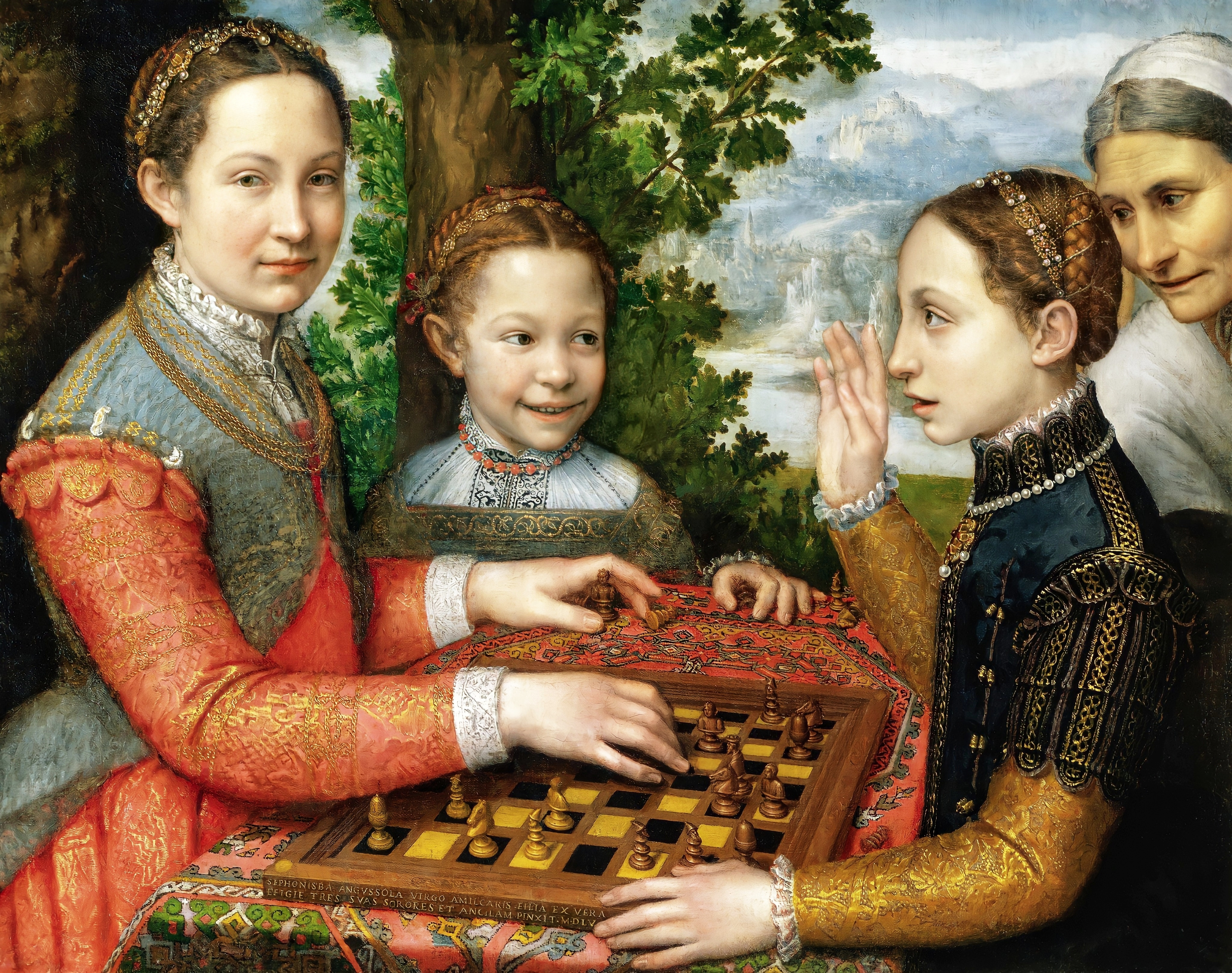
The Game of Chess (1555) by Sofonisba Anguissola, depicting her sisters Lucia (left), Minerva (right), and Europa (middle) playing chess. The older woman is their maidservant.

The game of chess was then played and known in all European countries. A famous 13th-century Spanish manuscript covering chess, backgammon, and dice is known as the Libro de los juegos, which is the earliest European treatise on chess as well as being the oldest document on European tables games. The rules were fundamentally similar to those of the Arabic shatranj. The differences were mostly in the use of a checkered board instead of a plain monochrome board used by Arabs and the habit of allowing some or all pawns to make an initial double step. In some regions, the queen, which had replaced the wazir, or the king could also make an initial two-square leap under some conditions.

Around 1200, the rules of shatranj started to be modified in Europe, culminating, several major changes later, in the emergence of modern chess practically as it is known today. A major change was the modern piece movement rules, which began to appear in intellectual circles in Valencia, Spain, around 1475, (Note: The allegorical poem Scachs d'amor, the first to describe a modern game, is probably from 1475.) which established the foundations and brought it very close to current chess. These new rules then were quickly adopted in Italy and Southern France before diffusing into the rest of Europe. Pawns gained the ability to advance two squares on their first move, while bishops and queens acquired their modern movement powers. The queen replaced the earlier vizier chess piece toward the end of the 10th century and by the 15th century had become the most powerful piece; in light of that, modern chess was often referred to at the time as "Queen's Chess" or "Mad Queen Chess". Castling, derived from the "king's leap", usually in combination with a pawn or rook move to bring the king to safety, was introduced. These new rules quickly spread throughout Western Europe.

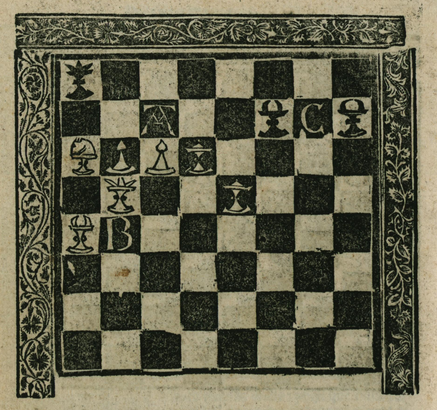
A tactics puzzle from Lucena's 1497 book

Writings about chess theory began to appear in the late 15th century. An anonymous treatise on chess of 1490 with the first part containing some openings and the second 30 endgames is deposited in the library of the University of Göttingen. The book El Libro dels jochs partitis dels schachs en nombre de 100 was written by Francesc Vicent in Segorbe in 1495, but no copy of this work has survived. The Repetición de Amores y Arte de Ajedrez (Repetition of Love and the Art of Playing Chess) by Spanish churchman Luis Ramírez de Lucena was published in Salamanca in 1497. Lucena and later masters like Portuguese Pedro Damiano, Italians Giovanni Leonardo Di Bona, Giulio Cesare Polerio and Gioachino Greco, and Spanish bishop Ruy López de Segura developed elements of opening theory and started to analyze simple endgames.

=== 1700–1873: Romantic era ===
The "Immortal Game", Anderssen vs. Kieseritzky, 1851

In the 18th century, the center of European chess life moved from Southern Europe to mainland France. The two most important French masters were François-André Danican Philidor, a musician by profession, who discovered the importance of pawns for chess strategy, and later Louis-Charles Mahé de La Bourdonnais, who won a famous series of matches against Irish master Alexander McDonnell in 1834. Centers of chess activity in this period were coffee houses in major European cities like Café de la Régence in Paris and Simpson's Divan in London.

At the same time, the Romantic intellectual movement had had a far-reaching impact on chess, with aesthetics and tactical beauty being held in higher regard than objective soundness and strategic planning. As a result, virtually all games began with the Open Game, and it was considered unsportsmanlike to decline gambits that invited tactical play such as the King's Gambit and the Evans Gambit. This chess philosophy is known as Romantic chess, and its sharp, tactical style of play was predominant until the late 19th century.

The rules concerning stalemate were finalized in the early 19th century. Also in the 19th century, the convention that White moves first was established (formerly either White or Black could move first). Finally, the rules around castling and en passant captures were standardized—variations in these rules persisted in Italy until the late 19th century. The resulting standard game is sometimes referred to as Western chess or international chess, especially in comparison with other games of the chess family such as xiangqi and shogi. Since the 19th century, the only rule changes, such as the establishment of the correct procedure for claiming a draw by repetition, have been technical in nature.

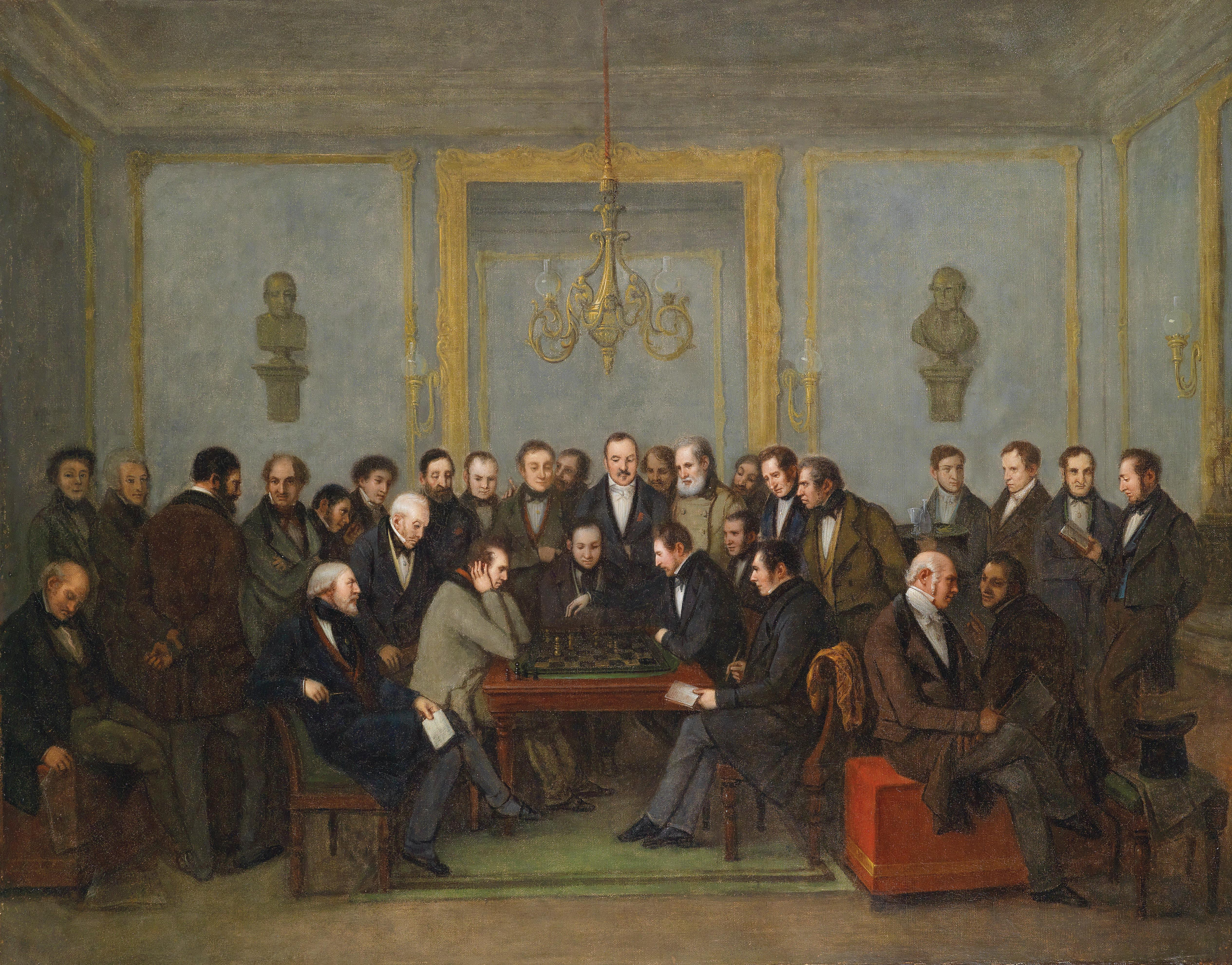
A depiction of the chess match between Howard Staunton and Pierre Saint-Amant, on 16 December 1843

As the 19th century progressed, chess organization developed quickly. Many chess clubs, chess books, and chess journals appeared. There were correspondence matches between cities; for example, the London Chess Club played against the Edinburgh Chess Club in 1824. Chess problems became a regular part of 19th-century newspapers; Bernhard Horwitz, Josef Kling, and Samuel Loyd composed some of the most influential problems. In 1843, von der Lasa published his and Bilguer's Handbuch des Schachspiels (Handbook of Chess), the first comprehensive manual of chess theory.

The first modern chess tournament was organized by Howard Staunton, a leading English chess player, and was held in London in 1851. It was won by the German Adolf Anderssen, who was hailed as the leading chess master. His energetic attacking style was typical for the time. Sparkling games like Anderssen's Immortal Game and Evergreen Game or Morphy's "Opera Game" were regarded as the highest possible summit of the art of chess. Deeper insight into the nature of chess came with the American Paul Morphy, an extraordinary chess prodigy. Morphy won against all important competitors (except Staunton, who refused to play), including Anderssen, during his short chess career between 1857 and 1863.

=== 1873–1945: Birth of a sport ===
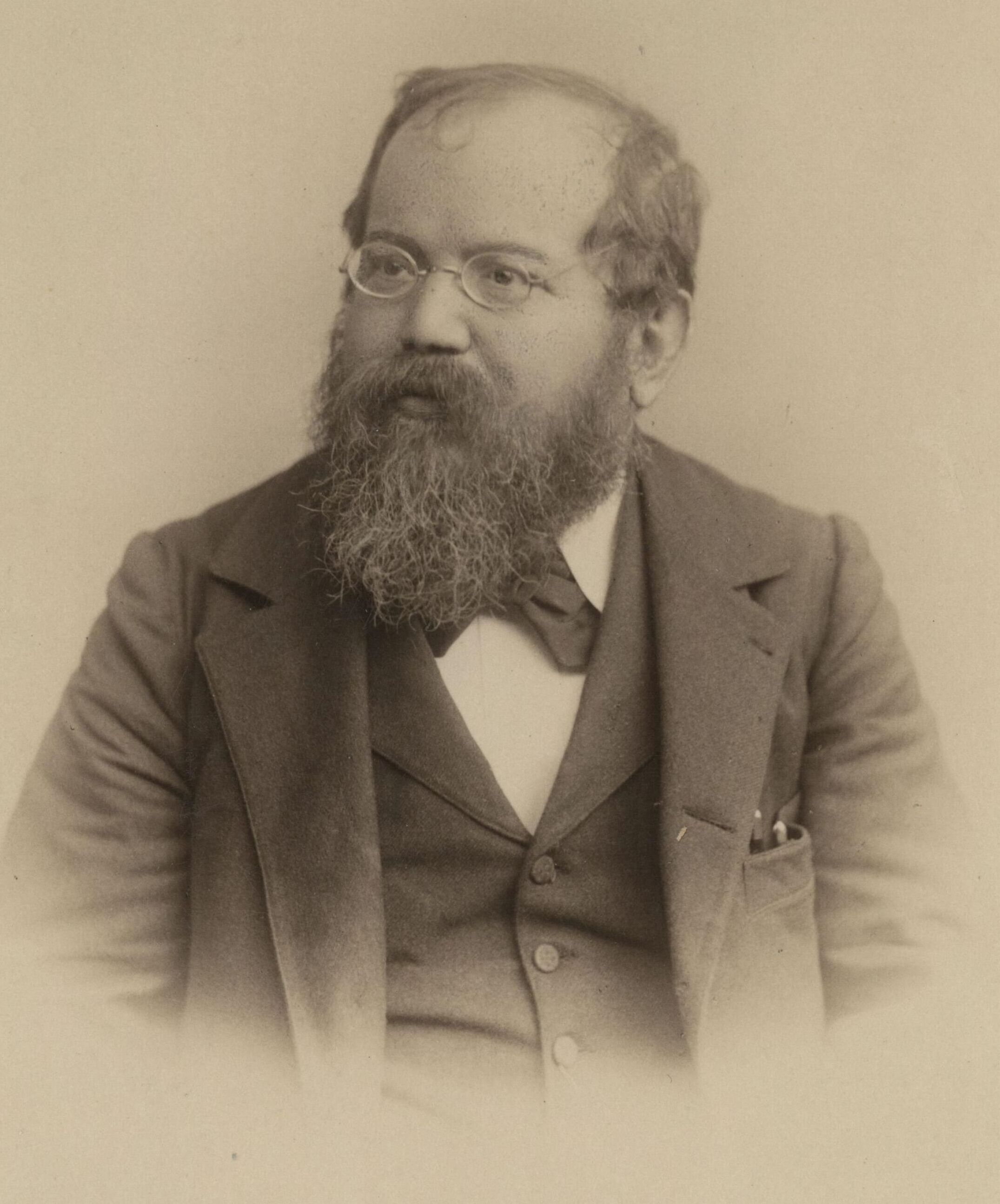
Wilhelm Steinitz, the first official World Chess Champion (1886–1894)

Prague-born Wilhelm Steinitz laid the foundations for a scientific approach to the game, the art of breaking a position down into components and preparing correct plans. In addition to his theoretical achievements, Steinitz founded an important tradition: his triumph over the leading German master Johannes Zukertort in 1886 is regarded as the first official World Chess Championship. This win marked a stylistic transition at the highest levels of chess from an attacking, tactical style predominant in the Romantic era to a more positional, strategic style introduced to the chess world by Steinitz. Steinitz lost his crown in 1894 to a much younger player, the German mathematician Emanuel Lasker, who maintained this title for 27 years, the longest tenure of any world champion.

After the end of the 19th century, the number of master tournaments and matches held annually quickly grew. The first Olympiad was held in Paris in 1924, and FIDE was founded initially for the purpose of organizing that event. In 1927, the Women's World Chess Championship was established; the first to hold the title was Czech-English master Vera Menchik.

A prodigy from Cuba, José Raúl Capablanca, known for his skill in endgames, won the World Championship from Lasker in 1921. Capablanca was undefeated in tournament play for eight years, from 1916 to 1924. His successor (1927) was the Russian-French Alexander Alekhine, a strong attacking player who died as the world champion in 1946. Alekhine briefly lost the title to Dutch player Max Euwe in 1935 and regained it two years later.

In the interwar period, chess was revolutionized by the new theoretical school of so-called hypermodernists like Aron Nimzowitsch and Richard Réti. They advocated controlling the center of the board with distant pieces rather than with pawns, thus inviting opponents to occupy the center with pawns, which become objects of attack. Among the innovations popularized by hypermodernists was the fianchetto: the development of bishops away from, rather than towards, the center, onto the b- and g-files.

=== 1945–1990: Post-World War II era ===
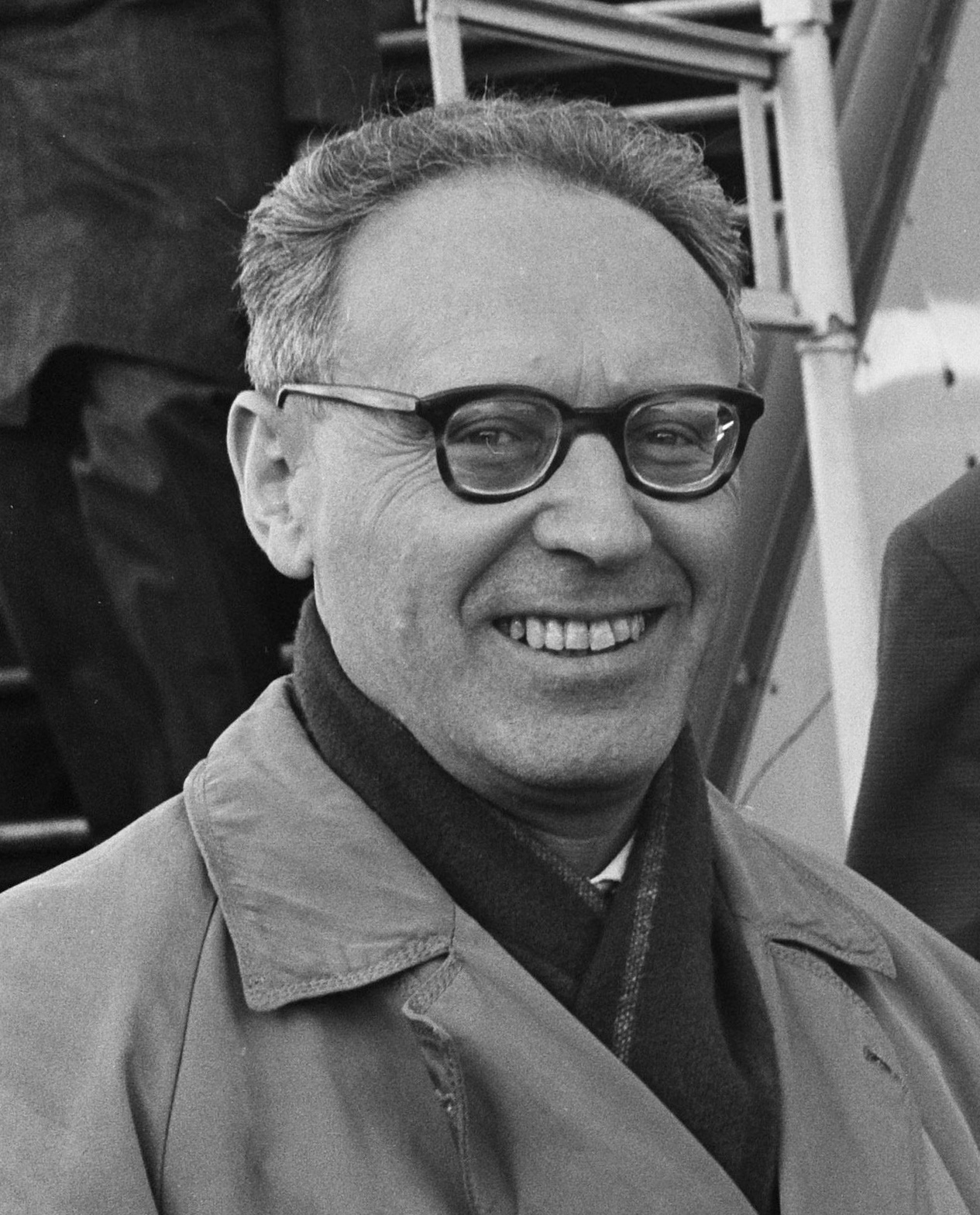
Mikhail Botvinnik, the first post-war World Champion

After the death of Alekhine, a new World Champion was sought. FIDE, which has controlled the title since then, ran a tournament of elite players. The winner of the 1948 tournament was Russian Mikhail Botvinnik. In 1950, FIDE established a system of titles, conferring the title of Grandmaster on 27 players. (Some sources state that, in 1914, the title of chess Grandmaster was first formally conferred by Tsar Nicholas II of Russia to Lasker, Capablanca, Alekhine, Tarrasch, and Marshall, but this is a disputed claim. (Note: This is stated in The Encyclopaedia of Chess (1970, p. 223) by Anne Sunnucks, but is disputed by Edward Winter (chess historian) in his Chess Notes 5144 and 5152.))

Botvinnik started an era of Soviet dominance in the chess world, which mainly through the Soviet government's politically inspired efforts to demonstrate intellectual superiority over the West stood almost uninterrupted for more than a half-century. Until the dissolution of the Soviet Union, there was only one non-Soviet champion, American Bobby Fischer (champion 1972–1975). Botvinnik also revolutionized opening theory. Previously, Black strove for equality, attempting to neutralize White's first-move advantage. As Black, Botvinnik strove for the initiative from the beginning. In the previous informal system of World Championships, the current champion decided which challenger he would play for the title and the challenger was forced to seek sponsors for the match. FIDE set up a new system of qualifying tournaments and matches. The world's strongest players were seeded into Interzonal tournaments, where they were joined by players who had qualified from Zonal tournaments (often national or regional championships). The leading finishers in these Interzonals would go through the "Candidates" stage, which was initially a tournament, and later a series of knockout matches. The winner of the Candidates would then play the reigning champion for the title. A champion defeated in a match had a right to play a rematch a year later. This system operated on a three-year cycle. Botvinnik participated in championship matches over a period of fifteen years. He won the world championship tournament in 1948 and retained the title in tied matches in 1951 and 1954. In 1957, he lost to Vasily Smyslov, but regained the title in a rematch in 1958. In 1960, he lost the title to the 23-year-old Latvian prodigy Mikhail Tal, an accomplished tactician and attacking player who is widely regarded as one of the most creative players ever, hence his nickname "the magician from Riga". Botvinnik again regained the title in a rematch in 1961.

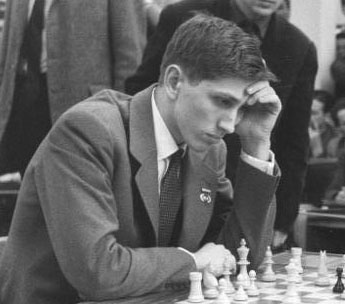
Bobby Fischer, World Champion from 1972 to 1975

Following the 1961 event, FIDE abolished the automatic right of a deposed champion to a rematch, and the next champion, Armenian Tigran Petrosian, a player renowned for his defensive and positional skills, held the title for two cycles, 1963–1969. His successor, Boris Spassky from Russia (champion 1969–1972), won games in both positional and sharp tactical style. The next championship, the so-called Match of the Century, saw the first non-Soviet challenger since World War II, American Bobby Fischer. Fischer defeated his opponents in the Candidates matches by unheard-of margins, and convincingly defeated Spassky for the world championship. The match was followed closely by news media of the day, leading to a surge in popularity for chess; it also held significant political importance at the height of the Cold War, with the match being seen by both sides as a microcosm of the conflict between East and West. In 1975, however, Fischer refused to defend his title against Soviet Anatoly Karpov when he was unable to reach agreement on conditions with FIDE, and Karpov obtained the title by default. Fischer modernized many aspects of chess, especially by extensively preparing openings.

Karpov defended his title twice against Viktor Korchnoi and dominated the 1970s and early 1980s with a string of tournament successes. In the 1984 World Chess Championship, Karpov faced his toughest challenge to date, the young Garry Kasparov from Baku, Soviet Azerbaijan. The match was aborted in controversial circumstances after 5 months and 48 games with Karpov leading by 5 wins to 3, but evidently exhausted; many commentators believed Kasparov, who had won the last two games, would have won the match had it continued. Kasparov won the 1985 rematch. Kasparov and Karpov contested three further closely fought matches in 1986, 1987 and 1990, Kasparov winning them all. Kasparov became the dominant figure of world chess from the mid-1980s until his retirement from competition in 2005.

==== Beginnings of chess technology ====
Chess-playing computer programs (later known as chess engines) began to appear in the 1960s. In 1970, the first major computer chess tournament, the North American Computer Chess Championship, was held, followed in 1974 by the first World Computer Chess Championship. In the late 1970s, dedicated home chess computers such as Fidelity Electronics' Chess Challenger became commercially available, as well as software to run on home computers. The overall standard of computer chess was low, however, until the 1990s.

The first endgame tablebases, which provided perfect play for relatively simple endgames such as king and rook versus king and bishop, appeared in the late 1970s. This set a precedent to the complete six- and seven-piece tablebases that became available in the 2000s and 2010s respectively.

Some of the earliest chess databases, which are collections of chess games searchable by move and position, include Ken Thompson and Joe Condon's king-queen versus king-rook chess database. They were used for testing early chess engines like Belle. It won the ACM North American Computer Chess Championship five times and the 1980 World Computer Chess Championship. The first commercial chess database was introduced by the German company ChessBase in 1987. Databases containing millions of chess games have since had a profound effect on opening theory and other areas of chess research.

Digital chess clocks were invented in 1973, though they did not become commonplace until the 1990s. Digital clocks allow for time controls involving increments and delays.

=== 1990–present: Rise of computers and online chess ===
==== Technology ====
The Internet enabled online chess, allowing users to play other people from different parts of the world in real time. The first online chess server, known as Internet Chess Server (ICS), was developed at the University of Utah in 1992. ICS formed the basis for the first commercial chess server, the Internet Chess Club, which was launched in 1995, and for other early chess servers such as Free Internet Chess Server (FICS). Since then, many other platforms have appeared, and online chess began to rival over-the-board chess in popularity. The two most popular platforms today are Chess.com and Lichess. During the 2020 COVID-19 pandemic, the isolation ensuing from quarantines imposed in many places around the world, combined with the success of the popular Netflix show The Queen's Gambit and other factors such as the popularity of online tournaments (notably PogChamps) and chess Twitch streamers, resulted in a surge of popularity not only for online chess, but for the game of chess in general; this phenomenon has been referred to in the media as the 2020 online chess boom.

Computer chess has also seen major advances. By the 1990s, chess engines could consistently defeat most amateurs, and in 1997 Deep Blue defeated World Champion Garry Kasparov in a six-game match, starting an era of computer dominance at the highest level of chess. In the 2010s, engines significantly stronger than even the best human players became accessible for free on a number of PC and mobile platforms, and free engine analysis became a commonplace feature on internet chess servers. An adverse effect of the easy availability of engine analysis on hand-held devices and personal computers has been the rise of computer cheating, which has grown to be a major concern in both over-the-board and online chess. In 2017, AlphaZero—a neural network also capable of playing shogi and Go—was introduced. Since then, many chess engines based on neural network evaluation have been written, the best of which have surpassed the traditional "brute-force" engines. AlphaZero also introduced many novel ideas and ways of playing the game, which affected the style of play at the top level.

Position: d8 white rook, c6 black queen, c3 black king, e3 black rook, c2 black rook, b1 white rook, d1 white king, f1 white queen

A mutual zugzwang position discovered by Marc Bourzutschky while researching 8-man tablebases. Either side to move loses.

As endgame tablebases developed, they began to provide perfect play in endgame positions in which the game-theoretical outcome was previously unknown, such as positions with king, queen and pawn against king and queen. In 1991, Lewis Stiller published a tablebase for select six-piece endgames, and by 2005, following the publication of Nalimov tablebases, all six-piece endgame positions were solved. In 2012, Lomonosov tablebases were published which solved all seven-piece endgame positions. Partial 8-man tablebases have since been developed by American researcher Marc Bourzutschky, though their enormous size makes them impractical for normal use. Use of tablebases enhances the performance of chess engines by providing definitive results in some branches of analysis.

Previously, preparation at the professional level required an extensive chess library and several subscriptions to publications such as Chess Informant to keep up with opening developments and study opponents' games. Today, preparation at the professional level involves the use of databases containing millions of games, and engines to analyze different opening variations and prepare novelties. A number of online learning resources are also available for players of all levels, such as online courses, tactics trainers, and video lessons.

Since the late 1990s, it has been possible to follow major international chess events online, a development in the status of chess as a spectator sport. While in the past moves have been relayed live, today chess organizers will often impose a half-hour delay as an anti-cheating measure. Third parties may provide commentary for chess games, and spectators may consult chess engines to aid in their own analysis. In the mid-to-late 2010s, and especially following the 2020 online boom, it became commonplace for supergrandmasters, such as Hikaru Nakamura and Magnus Carlsen, to livestream chess gameplay and content on platforms such as Twitch. Also following the boom, online chess started being viewed as an esport, with esport teams signing chess players for the first time in 2020. In 2025, the number of esport teams signing chess players rose considerably, after chess was added to Saudi Arabia's Esports World Cup.

==== Growth ====
The number of grandmasters and other chess professionals has also grown in the modern era. Kenneth Regan and Guy Haworth conducted research involving comparison of move choices by players of different levels and from different periods with the analysis of strong chess engines. They concluded that the increase in the number of grandmasters and higher Elo ratings of the top players reflect an actual increase in the average standard of play, rather than "rating inflation" or "title inflation".

Organized chess even for young children has become common. FIDE holds world championships for age levels down to 8 years old. The largest tournaments, in number of players, are those held for children.

==== Organized chess ====
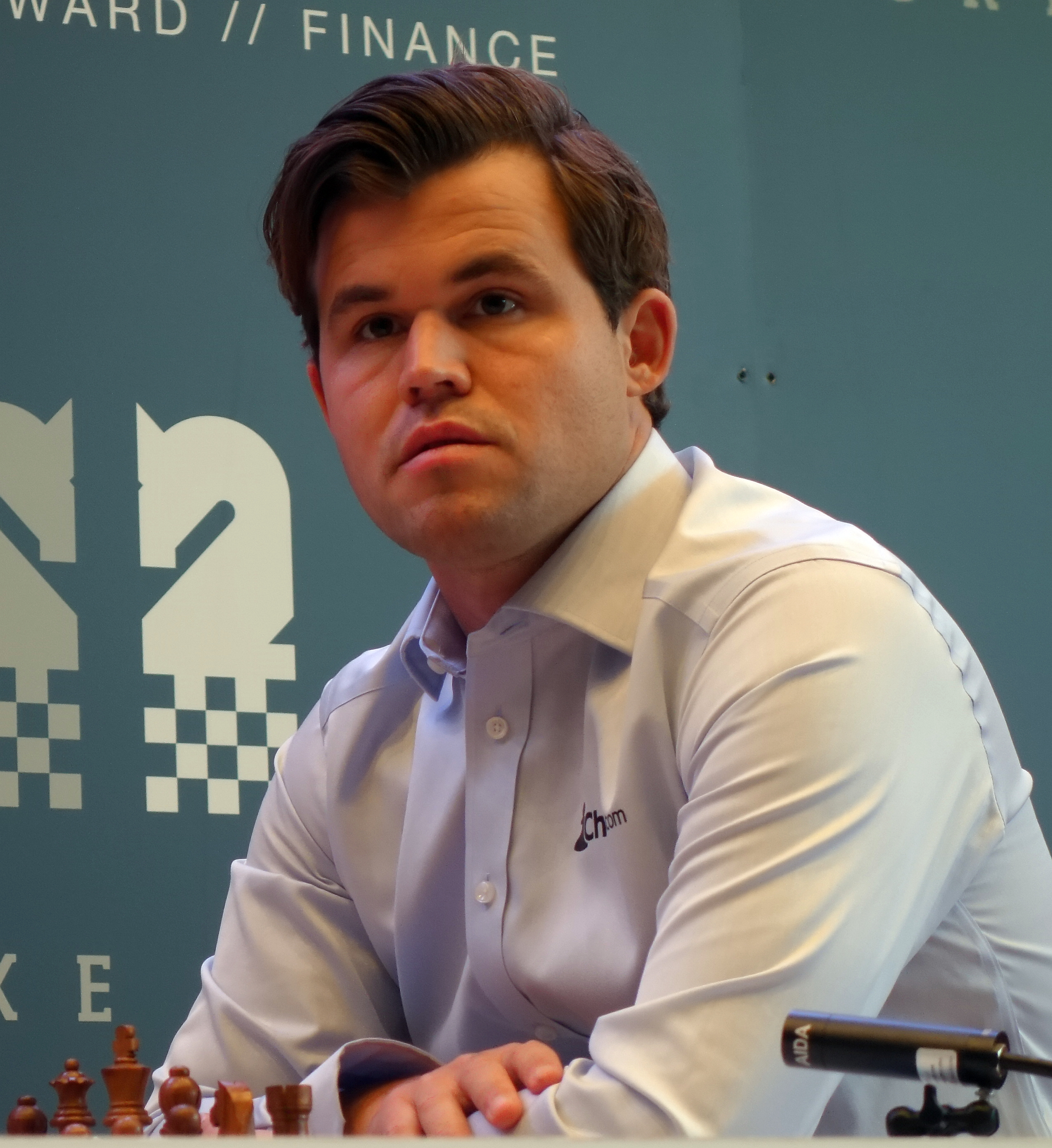
Magnus Carlsen of Norway, top 1 FIDE ranked player since July 2011

In 1993, Garry Kasparov and Nigel Short broke ties with FIDE to organize their own match for the World Championship and formed a competing Professional Chess Association (PCA). From then until 2006, there were two simultaneous World Championships and respective World Champions: the PCA or "classical" champions extending the Steinitzian tradition in which the current champion plays a challenger in a series of games, and the other following FIDE's new format of many players competing in a large knockout tournament to determine the champion. Kasparov lost his PCA title in 2000 to Vladimir Kramnik of Russia. Due to the complicated state of world chess politics and difficulties obtaining commercial sponsorships, Kasparov was never able to challenge for the title again. Despite this, he continued to dominate in top level tournaments and remained the world's highest-rated player until his retirement from competitive chess in 2005.

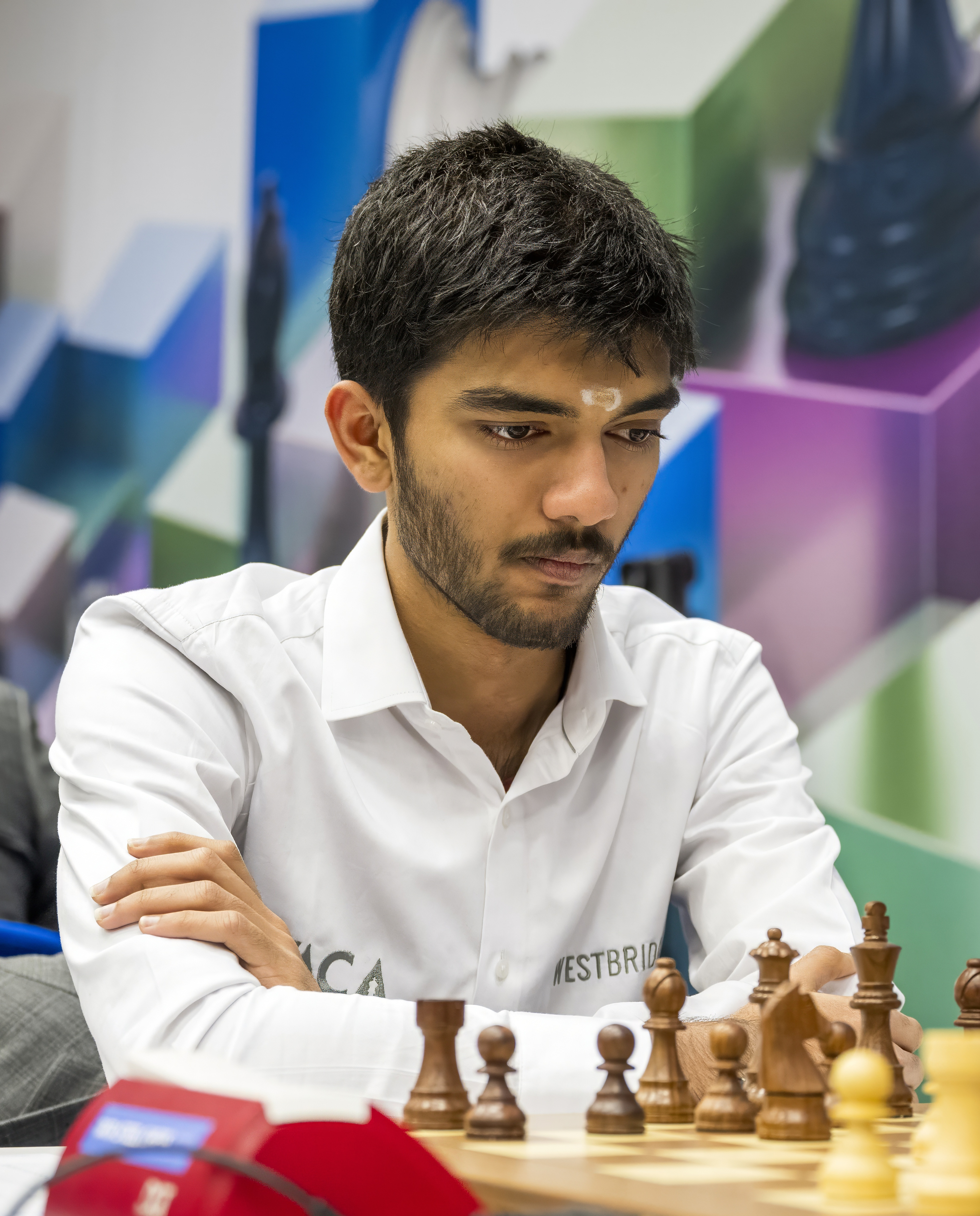
Gukesh Dommaraju of India, current World Champion

The World Chess Championship 2006, in which Kramnik beat the FIDE World Champion Veselin Topalov, reunified the titles and made Kramnik the undisputed World Chess Champion. In September 2007, he lost the title to Viswanathan Anand of India. Anand defended his title in the revenge match of 2008, 2010 and 2012. Magnus Carlsen defeated Anand in 2013, defending his title in 2014, 2016, 2018, and 2021, whereafter he announced that he would not defend his title a fifth time. The 2023 championship was played between the winner and runner-up of the Candidates Tournament 2022: Ian Nepomniachtchi of Russia and Ding Liren of China. Ding beat Nepomniachtchi, making him the world champion. In 2024, Gukesh Dommaraju of India beat Ding. Carlsen has however remained the world's highest-rated player.

In 2023, FIDE prohibited transgender women from competing in FIDE-organized women's events, pending a "further decision" at a later date.

== Chess literature ==
Chess has an extensive literature. In 1913, the chess historian H.J.R. Murray estimated the total number of books, magazines, and chess columns in newspapers to be about 5,000. B.H. Wood estimated the number, as of 1949, to be about 20,000. David Hooper and Kenneth Whyld write that, "Since then there has been a steady increase year by year of the number of new chess publications. No one knows how many have been printed." Significant public chess libraries include the John G. White Chess and Checkers Collection at Cleveland Public Library, with over 32,000 chess books and over 6,000 bound volumes of chess periodicals; and the Chess & Draughts collection at the National Library of the Netherlands, with about 30,000 books.

== Connections to other fields ==
=== Arts and humanities ===
In the Middle Ages and during the Renaissance, chess was a part of noble culture; it was used to teach war strategy and was dubbed the "King's Game". Gentlemen are "to be meanly seene in the play at Chestes", says the overview at the beginning of Baldassare Castiglione's The Book of the Courtier (1528, English 1561 by Sir Thomas Hoby), but chess should not be a gentleman's main passion. Castiglione explains it further:

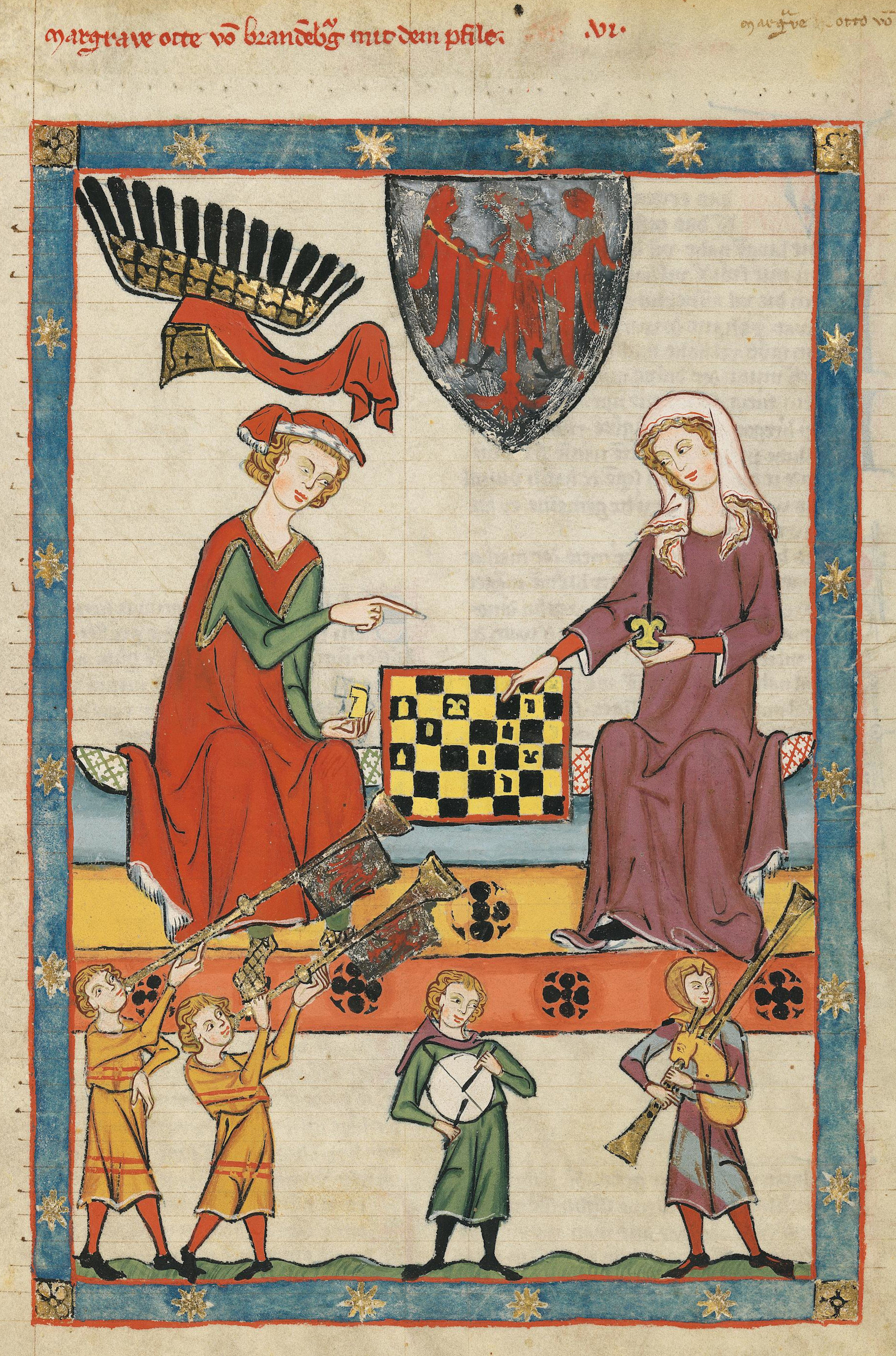
Noble chess players, Germany, c. 1320

And what say you to the game at chestes? It is truely an honest kynde of enterteynmente and wittie, quoth Syr Friderick. But me think it hath a fault, whiche is, that a man may be to couning at it, for who ever will be excellent in the playe of chestes, I beleave he must beestowe much tyme about it, and applie it with so much study, that a man may assoone learne some noble scyence, or compase any other matter of importaunce, and yet in the ende in beestowing all that laboure, he knoweth no more but a game. Therfore in this I beleave there happeneth a very rare thing, namely, that the meane is more commendable, then the excellency.

Some of the elaborate chess sets used by the aristocracy at least partially survive, such as the Lewis chessmen.

Chess was often used as a basis of sermons on morality. An example is Liber de moribus hominum et officiis nobilium sive super ludo scacchorum ('Book of the customs of men and the duties of nobles or the Book of Chess'), written by an Italian Dominican friar Jacobus de Cessolis c. 1300. This book was one of the most popular of the Middle Ages. The work was translated into many other languages (the first printed edition was published at Utrecht in 1473) and was the basis for William Caxton's The Game and Playe of the Chesse (1474), one of the first books printed in English. Different chess pieces were used as metaphors for different classes of people, and human duties were derived from the rules of the game or from visual properties of the chess pieces:

The knyght ought to be made alle armed upon an hors in suche wyse that he haue an helme on his heed and a spere in his ryght hande/ and coueryd wyth his sheld/ a swerde and a mace on his lyft syde/ Cladd wyth an hawberk and plates to fore his breste/ legge harnoys on his legges/ Spores on his heelis on his handes his gauntelettes/ his hors well broken and taught and apte to bataylle and couerid with his armes/ whan the knyghtes ben maad they ben bayned or bathed/ that is the signe that they shold lede a newe lyf and newe maners/ also they wake alle the nyght in prayers and orysons vnto god that he wylle gyue hem grace that they may gete that thynge that they may not gete by nature/ The kynge or prynce gyrdeth a boute them a swerde in signe/ that they shold abyde and kepe hym of whom they take theyr dispenses and dignyte.

Known in the circles of clerics, students, and merchants, chess entered into the popular culture of the Middle Ages. An example is the 209th song of Carmina Burana from the 13th century, which starts with the names of chess pieces, Roch, pedites, regina... Chess was discouraged by some Jewish, Catholic, and Orthodox religious figures in the Middle Ages. Some Muslim authorities have prohibited it even recently, for example Ruhollah Khomeini in 1979 and Abdul-Aziz al-Sheikh in 2016.

During the Age of Enlightenment, chess was viewed as a means of self-improvement. Benjamin Franklin, in his article "The Morals of Chess" (1786), wrote:

The Game of Chess is not merely an idle amusement; several very valuable qualities of the mind, useful in the course of human life, are to be acquired and strengthened by it, so as to become habits ready on all occasions; for life is a kind of Chess, in which we have often points to gain, and competitors or adversaries to contend with, and in which there is a vast variety of good and ill events, that are, in some degree, the effect of prudence, or the want of it. By playing at Chess then, we may learn:

I. Foresight, which looks a little into futurity, and considers the consequences that may attend an action ...

II. Circumspection, which surveys the whole Chess-board, or scene of action: – the relation of the several Pieces, and their situations ...

III. Caution, not to make our moves too hastily ...

Chess was occasionally criticized in the 19th century as a waste of time.

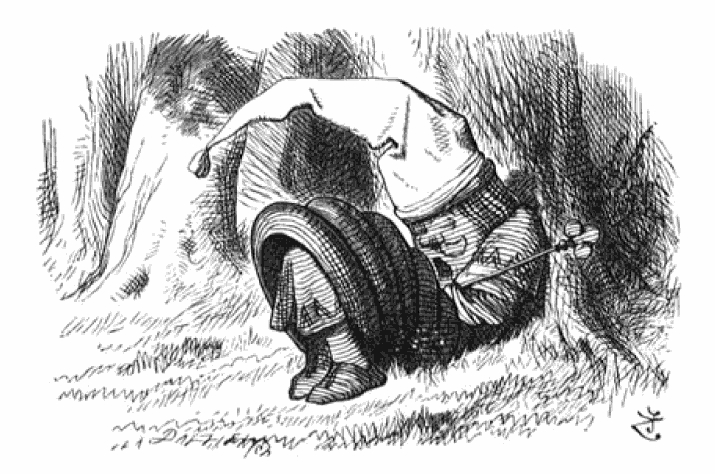
Through the Looking-Glass: the Red King is snoring. Illustration by Sir John Tenniel.

Chess is taught to children in schools around the world today. Many schools host chess clubs, and there are many scholastic tournaments specifically for children. Tournaments are held regularly in many countries, hosted by organizations such as the United States Chess Federation and the National Scholastic Chess Foundation.

Chess is many times depicted in the arts; significant works where chess plays a key role range from Thomas Middleton's A Game at Chess to Through the Looking-Glass by Lewis Carroll, to Vladimir Nabokov's The Defense, to The Royal Game by Stefan Zweig. Chess has also featured in film classics such as Ingmar Bergman's The Seventh Seal, Satyajit Ray's The Chess Players, and Powell and Pressburger's A Matter of Life and Death.

Chess is also present in contemporary popular culture. For example, the characters in Star Trek play a futuristic version of the game called "Federation Tri-Dimensional Chess", and "Wizard's Chess" is played in J.K. Rowling's Harry Potter.

=== Mathematics ===
The game structure and nature of chess are related to several branches of mathematics. Many combinatorical and topological problems connected to chess, such as the knight's tour and the eight queens puzzle, have been known for hundreds of years.

Mathematicians Euler, Legendre, de Moivre, and Vandermonde studied the knight's tour.

The number of legal positions in chess is estimated to be (4.59 ± 0.38) × 10^{44} with a 95% confidence level, with a game-tree complexity of approximately 10^{123}. The game-tree complexity of chess was first calculated by Claude Shannon as 10^{120}, a number known as the Shannon number. An average position typically has thirty to forty possible moves, but there may be as few as zero (in the case of checkmate or stalemate) or (in a constructed position) as many as 218.

In 1913, Ernst Zermelo used chess as a basis for his theory of game strategies, which is considered one of the predecessors of game theory. Zermelo's theorem states that it is possible to solve chess, i.e. to determine with certainty the outcome of a perfectly played game (either White can force a win, or Black can force a win, or both sides can force at least a draw). With 10^{43} legal positions in chess, however, it will take an impossibly long time to compute a perfect strategy with any feasible technology.

==== Applied mathematics ====
A novel methodology in steganography explores the use of chess-based covers (such as puzzles, chess problems, game reports, training documents, news articles, etc.) for concealing data within a selection of moves, each hiding some bits. Several proof-of-concept projects have been developed that convert text or files into binary code, which is then converted into a series of legal chess moves, that can then be decrypted and downloaded.

Correspondence chess has been historically suspected of being a potential steganographic medium. Melville Davisson Post documented a chess problem that was used to create a pictorial cipher during World War I. During World War II, extensive postal censorship was imposed on military personnel from the United States and Canada that made playing correspondence chess impossible, arising from suspicion that chess could be used to send secret messages to the enemies.

=== Psychology ===
There is an extensive scientific literature on chess psychology. (Note: Chess is even called the "drosophila" of cognitive psychology and artificial intelligence (AI) studies, because it represents the domain in which expert performance has been most intensively studied and measured.) Alfred Binet and others showed that knowledge and verbal, rather than visuospatial, ability lies at the core of expertise. In his doctoral thesis, Adriaan de Groot showed that chess masters can rapidly perceive the key features of a position. According to de Groot, this perception, made possible by years of practice and study, is more important than the sheer ability to anticipate moves. De Groot showed that chess masters can memorize positions shown for a few seconds almost perfectly. The ability to memorize does not alone account for chess-playing skill, since masters and novices, when faced with random arrangements of chess pieces, had equivalent recall (about six positions in each case). Rather, it is the ability to recognize patterns, which are then memorized, which distinguished the skilled players from the novices. When the positions of the pieces were taken from an actual game, the masters had almost total positional recall.

More recent research has focused on chess as mental training; the respective roles of knowledge and look-ahead search; brain imaging studies of chess masters and novices; blindfold chess; the role of personality and intelligence in chess skill; gender differences; and computational models of chess expertise. The role of practice and talent in the development of chess and other domains of expertise has led to much empirical investigation. Ericsson and colleagues have argued that deliberate practice is sufficient for reaching high levels of expertise in chess. Recent research, however, fails to replicate their results and indicates that factors other than practice are also important. For example, Fernand Gobet and colleagues have shown that stronger players started playing chess at a young age and that experts born in the Northern Hemisphere are more likely to have been born in late winter and early spring. Compared to the general population, chess players are more likely to be non-right-handed, though they found no correlation between handedness and skill.

A relationship between chess skill and intelligence has long been discussed in scientific literature as well as in popular culture. Academic studies that investigate the relationship date back at least to 1927. Although one meta-analysis and most children studies find a positive correlation between general cognitive ability and chess skill, adult studies show mixed results.

== Related games ==
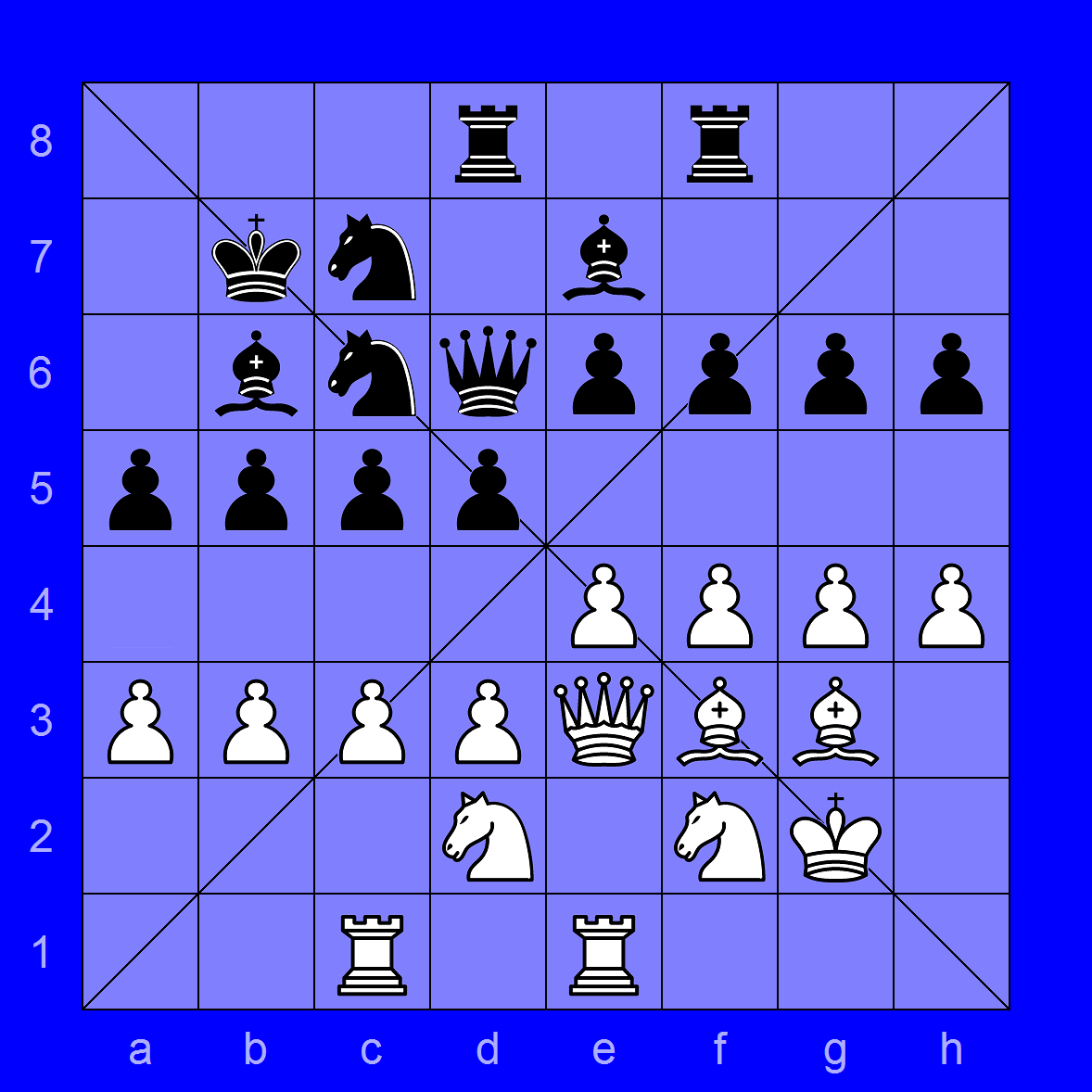
Sittuyin, after setup phase. Players elect their own starting setups behind the pawns.

=== Traditional and regional forms of chess ===
Relatives of chess include direct predecessors of chess, such as chaturanga and shatranj, as well as traditional national or regional games that share common ancestors with Western chess, such as xiangqi (Chinese chess), shogi (Japanese chess), janggi (Korean chess), ouk chatrang (Cambodian chess), makruk (Thai chess), sittuyin (Burmese chess), and shatar (Mongolian chess).

In the comparison of chess with games often referred to as national forms of chess, chess may be referred to as Western chess or international chess.

=== Chess variants ===
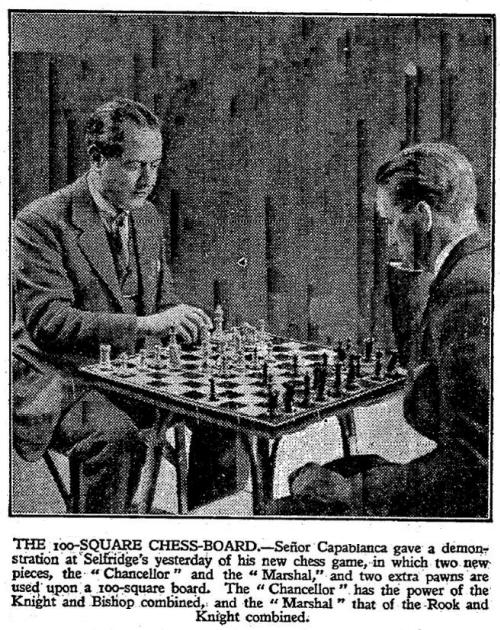
Capablanca demonstrating Capablanca chess on a 10×10 board as reported in a 1929 April issue of The Times

There are more than two thousand published chess variants, games with similar but different rules, most of which are of relatively recent origin. They include modern variations employing different rules (e.g. losing chess and Chess960 (Note: In 2008 FIDE added Chess960 rules to an appendix of the Handbook. This section is now classified under "Guidelines", indicating that the rules presented do not have the weight of FIDE law.)), different armies (e.g. Dunsany's chess and Weak!), non-standard pieces (e.g. Capablanca chess and Falcon–hunter chess), and different board geometries (e.g. hexagonal chess and infinite chess).

In the context of chess variants, chess is commonly referred to as orthodox chess, orthochess, and classic chess.

== See also ==
- Glossary of chess
- Glossary of chess problems
- Glossary of computer chess terms
- List of abstract strategy games
- List of chess players
- List of World Chess Championships
- Outline of chess
- Women in chess
