= Fritz and Chesster =

Series of educational programmes about chess for kids

Fritz and Chesster (German: Fritz und Fertig) is a series of educational programs about chess for children. In each of the four PC games, Fritz White and his cousin Bianca learn chess with the help of the anthropomorphic rat Chesster. In the first three games, they learn various elements of chess before competing against King Black in a chess game; the fourth game is set on an alien planet. The first game teaches the rules of the game, along with some basic checkmates and strategy. The next games teach opening theory, tactics, middlegame analysis and endgames, along with checkmate patterns. Other games feature chess variants, chess puzzles or timed games with highscore boards.

The programs were produced in Germany for Terzio and Chessbase between 2003 and 2009; they have been translated into 17 languages. Reviewers found the first two games entertaining and commented on the lengthiness of the storylines. Chess puzzle books and workbooks featuring the characters have been produced.

== Gameplay ==
=== Part 1 ===
While his parents are on holiday, Fritz White—controlled by the player—is challenged to a game of chess by King Black. Working with his cousin Bianca, and his parents' friend King Kaleidoscope, they travel across the countryside while engaging in a series of minigames, which demonstrate chess piece movements, such as a Ms. Pac-Man-style game demonstrating the rook's horizontal and vertical movements, and a sumo wrestling game based on the concept of king opposition. Fritz and Bianca arrive at the IntelliGym, where they meet a talking rat named Chesster.

With Chesster, they progress through the three stages of the gym, which contain various equipment corresponding to different aspects of chess. When reaching each piece of equipment, a cutscene shows Chesster explaining the games to Fritz and Bianca and then the player has the opportunity to play. Some puzzles are untimed and the player has to complete a certain number to progress, whereas others are timed with a highscore board and the player must reach a certain score. The lightweight section formally describes the movement of the chess pieces. The middleweight section describes the initial chessboard layout, castling, stalemate, checkmate with two rooks or one rook. The heavyweight section explains relative piece values and other strategy.

After completing every exercise, Fritz plays chess against King Black. A television segment is played depending on the game's outcome. The player can then play the weak King Kaleidoscope, the strong King Black or Chesster—who has different difficulty levels—with options to receive hints during the game or switch sides, particularly if the opponent is winning.

=== Part 2 ===
At the Pleasantville Village Olympics, the player takes part in timed games involving movements that resemble that of a knight fork and bishop skewer. Fritz and Bianca then fall down a chute leading to the basement of King Black's castle, where Chesster has been kidnapped. King Black tells them that they are trapped. They begin to use his chess training machines and accumulate "ELO" creatures as their ability improves, which they need in order for a sensor in the elevator to allow them to journey upwards.

On the lower floor, they take part in a timed game involving checking, a game involving calculating who wins from an exchange and an explanation of the classical rules of opening development. They also learn about discovered check and double check and play a game about rat traps similar to Space Invaders. On the middle and upper floors, they learn about long algebraic notation, promotion key squares, a square rule for whether a pawn can outrun a king and deflection. Additionally, a puppet quizzes them about opening strategy and they play blindfold games, odds games, and a game involving memorising the pieces in a sample game. They also see Fool's mate and Scholar's mate.

After completing these minigames, they use pieces of paper they found on the floor along the way to solve a chess puzzle of mate in seven. They challenge King Black to a duel and a television segment plays depending on whether the user wins or loses. They can then play against King Kaleidoscope, King Purple, a computer, King Black or Chesster at various difficulty levels.

=== Part 3 ===
At the Pleasantville fairground, King Black has upset 16 kings by winning their "Chess Chubbies"—plush toys—in a chess game. Fritz and Bianca, accompanied by Chesster, aim to win 16 such toys to give to the kings. They also play Chesster's flea circus attraction, in which they have to place a piece on the board such that black is in checkmate under time pressure.

The 16 games teach undermining, interference and decoy moves. One covers strategy in choosing a move, while another asks the player to remember lines they choose that begin with the Ruy Lopez. Additionally, one game is similar to the video game Breakout, there is one in which chicks have to be lured into a trap, and another features a chess game with randomized effects at predetermined moments, such as all pieces being removed from the h-file. The player is also introduced to chess clocks and losing chess and asked to find checkmate after viewing a blindfold chess opening. Other games focus on checkmates, including Anastasia's mate, Morphy's mate, checkmate with two bishops and with a bishop and a knight—without reaching a draw by the 50 moves rule. Chesster teaches the players when a lone king can or can't force a draw against a king and a rook pawn, and how to win or force a draw in the rook and pawn versus rook endgame.

The player then plays against King Black in a chess game with time control of ten minutes per side. They can then play against Chesster at various levels of difficulty, King Kaleidoscope, King Black, or a team consisting of the Chess Chubbies.

=== Part 4 ===
The game takes place on an alien planet, in which Fritz and Bianca learn additional tactics and strategies. They learn about the Queen's Gambit, blockades, additional checkmate patterns, passed pawns, the concepts of space and tempo, drawing strategies and variants including dice chess.

== Production ==
The game was written by the German author and illustrator Jörg Hilbert and the headteacher and chess trainer Bjorn Lengwenus. It was created in collaboration between Terzio's imprint Quinto, and ChessBase.

== Release ==
- Fritz & Fertig: Schach, lernen und trainieren [Learn to Play Chess with Fritz & Chesster] (CD-ROM) (in German). Viva Media. 2003. ISBN 1932174133.
- Fritz & Fertig: Schach im schwarzen Schloß [Fritz & Chesster: Chess in the Black Castle] (CD-ROM) (in German). Viva Media. November 1, 2004. ISBN 9781932174687.
- Fritz & Fertig: Schach für Siegertypen [Fritz & Chesster: Chess for Winners] (CD-ROM) (in German). Viva Media. 2006. ISBN 9781934088265.
- Fritz & Fertig: Schach für Außerirdische [Fritz & Chesster: Chess for Aliens] (CD-ROM) (in German). Viva Media. 2009. ISBN 9783898353922.

Part 1 was released on a CD-ROM and ran on Windows 95 and later Windows machines. In 2018, it was released as an iOS app. The game has been translated into 17 languages. Its description says that it is suitable for children aged eight and upwards. Chess puzzle books and workbooks featuring the characters in the series were also produced.

== Reception ==
In 2009, the game won the Deutscher Computerspielpreis (German Computer Games Award) in the category Best Children's Game.

Hope Katz Gibbs of The Washington Post praised Part 1 as a "clever teaching tool" which divides learning chess into "small, kid-friendly lessons". Brian Wilson of School Library Journal wrote that Part 1 has "an overlong story, too much dialogue, and some confusing directions" but is "humorous" and "mostly successful" in teaching chess. AllGame gave Part 1 a rating of 3.5 out of 5 and called it a "[v]ery amusing and effective introductory game on chess basics." The New York Times' Charles Herold reviewed Part 2 positively, calling the graphics "appealing" and the dialogue "amusing", while finding that it was "the most entertaining way" he knew of to improve one's chess. Karen Yannacio of Parenting for High Potential said that she was "impressed with the training modules" of Part 2 and believed that its graphics were "incredibly appealing and fun". Yannacio also commented that the dialogue "can get long and can't be fast-forwarded".

== See also ==
- Fritz (chess)
