= Staircase maneuver =

Chess tactic

The staircase maneuver (or staircase movement) is a tactical motif that employs the idea of a series of checks, or alternation between pins and checks, to advance a queen, rook, or king along a diagonal via a series of stepped orthogonal moves.

== Examples ==
Staircase maneuvers tend to occur in queen and pawn endgames, where the defender has advanced pawns on the seventh rank. Here the attacking queen alternates between black and white squares giving pins and checks until it reaches an open file to deliver the final mate.

Position: a2 black pawn, b2 black pawn, c2 white queen, d2 white king, e2 white pawn, f2 white pawn, g2 white pawn, a1 black king

White mates in 12.

In the diagram, if Black's pawn on b2 had already queened on b1, the game would be drawn. White mates in 12, however, using the staircase maneuver:

1.Qc3 Kb1 2.Qd3+ Ka1 3.Qd4 Kb1 4.Qe4+ Ka1 5.Qe5 Kb1 6.Qf5+ Ka1 7.Qf6 Kb1 8.Qg6+ Ka1 9.Qg7 Kb1 10.Qh7+ Ka1 11.Qh8 Kb1 12.Qh1#

Position: d8 black rook, h8 black king, f7 black rook, g7 black pawn, b6 white queen, d6 black bishop, e6 black bishop, c5 black pawn, g5 black queen, h5 black pawn, e4 black pawn, b3 white pawn, e3 white pawn, h3 white pawn, a2 white pawn, b2 white bishop, d2 black pawn, f2 white pawn, g2 white pawn, a1 white rook, d1 white knight, f1 white knight, g1 white king

Tarrasch resigned after 34.Kh1 Bxh3 35.gxh3 Rf3 36.Ng3 h4 37.Bf6 Qxf6 38.Nxe4 Rxh3+.

Position: d8 black rook, h8 black king, g7 black pawn, d6 black bishop, c5 black pawn, d5 black bishop, h5 black pawn, a4 white queen, b3 white pawn, e3 white pawn, f3 black rook, h3 white pawn, a2 white pawn, b2 white bishop, d2 black pawn, f2 white pawn, g2 white king, a1 white rook, d1 white knight, f1 white knight

37...Rg3+ begins a staircase.

In the game Tarrasch–Alekhine, Piešt'any 1922, after 33...Be6 (first diagram), if play had continued instead 34.Qc6 Rf3 35.Qxe4 Bd5 36.Qa4 Qxg2+ 37.Kxg2 (second diagram), a staircase maneuver resulting in mate is possible:

37...Rg3+ 38.Kh2 Rg2+ 39.Kh1 Rh2+ 40.Kg1 Rh1#

== See also ==
- Chess tactics
- Windmill
