= Decoy (chess) =

Chess tactic

In chess, a decoy is a tactic that lures an enemy man off its square and away from its defensive role. Typically this means away from a square on which it defends another piece or threat. The tactic is also called a deflection. Usually the piece is decoyed to a particular square via the sacrifice of a piece on that square. A piece so sacrificed is called a decoy. When the piece decoyed or deflected is the king, the tactic is known as attraction. In general in the middlegame, the sacrifice of a decoy piece is called a diversionary sacrifice.

== Examples ==
Honfi vs. Barczay, 1977

Position: c8 black rook, e8 black rook, g8 black king, b7 black pawn, g7 black bishop, h7 black pawn, a6 black pawn, d6 black pawn, f6 black queen, g6 black pawn, b5 black knight, d5 white pawn, c4 white pawn, e4 white bishop, h4 white pawn, b3 white knight, d3 white queen, a2 white pawn, b2 white pawn, e2 white rook, b1 white king, h1 white rook

Black to move

The game Honfi–Barczay, Kecskemet 1977, with Black to play, illustrates two separate decoys. First, the white queen is set up on c4 for a knight fork:

1... Rxc4! 2. Qxc4

Next, the fork is executed by removing the sole defender of the a3-square:

2... Qxb2!+ 3. Rxb2 Na3+ 4. Kc1

Finally, a zwischenzug decoys (attracts) the king to b2:

4... Bxb2+

After either 5.Kxb2 Nxc4+ 6.Kc3 Rxe4, or 5.Kd1 Nxc4, Black is two pawns ahead and should win comfortably.

Position: g8 black king, g7 black pawn, h7 black pawn, b6 black queen, a5 black pawn, c5 white knight, d4 white pawn, g2 white pawn, h2 white pawn, f1 white rook, g1 white king

Example of attraction

In this position, after the moves 1.Rf8+ Kxf8 (forced) 2.Nd7+ Ke7 3.Nxb6, White wins the queen and the game. A similar, but more complex position is described by Huczek.

Vidmar vs. Euwe, 1929

Position: g8 black king, f7 black pawn, g7 black bishop, b6 black pawn, d6 white knight, h6 black pawn, a5 black pawn, g5 black pawn, f4 black queen, a3 white queen, h3 white pawn, a2 white pawn, c2 black rook, d1 white rook, e1 white rook, h1 white king

Position after 33...Qf4

In the diagrammed position from Vidmar–Euwe, Carlsbad 1929, Black had just played 33...Qf4, threatening mate on h2. White now uncorks the elegant combination 34.Re8+ Bf8 (forced) 35.Rxf8+ (attraction) Kxf8 (forced) 36.Nf5+ (discovered check) Kg8 (36...Ke8 37.Qe7#) 37.Qf8+ (attraction) 1–0 Black resigns. (If 37...Kxf8 then 38.Rd8#. If 37...Kh7 then 38.Qg7#.) The combination after 33...Qf4 features two separate examples of the attraction motif.

Dementiev vs. Dzindzichashvili, 1972

Position: g8 black king, g7 black pawn, c6 black queen, e6 black pawn, g6 white pawn, e5 white pawn, f5 black knight, h5 white queen, f3 white rook, g3 white bishop, h2 white king, c1 black rook

Position after 61.g6

This example shows a position from the game Dementiev–Dzindzichashvili, URS 1972. White had just played 61.g6 (with the threat 62.Qh7+ Kf8 63.Qh8+ (63.Rxf5+ =) Ke7 64.Bh4+ and mate in one). However, Black continued with the crushing 61...Rh1+ (attraction) 62. Kxh1 (best) Nxg3+ (the white rook is pinned) 63.Kh2 Nxh5 and White has dropped his queen to the knight fork. In the game, White resigned after 61...Rh1+.

Petrosian vs. Pachman, 1961

Position: a8 black rook, c8 black bishop, d8 black rook, b7 black pawn, e7 black knight, f7 black pawn, g7 black king, h7 black pawn, d6 white bishop, e6 black pawn, f6 black bishop, g6 black pawn, a5 black pawn, b5 black queen, c5 black pawn, c4 white knight, e4 white rook, b3 white pawn, d3 white pawn, f3 white queen, g3 white pawn, b2 white pawn, c2 white pawn, f2 white pawn, g2 white bishop, h2 white pawn, a1 white rook, g1 white king

Position after 18...Rd8

Perhaps the most celebrated game featuring a decoy theme is Petrosian–Pachman, Bled 1961, which also involved a queen sacrifice. Pachman resigned after 19.Qxf6+ (attraction) Kxf6 20.Be5+ Kg5 21.Bg7! setting a mating net.

Menchik vs. Graf, 1937

Position: a8 black rook, f8 black rook, g8 black king, a7 black pawn, b7 black bishop, c7 black queen, e7 black bishop, f7 black pawn, b6 black pawn, e6 black pawn, g6 black pawn, g5 white knight, h5 black pawn, c4 white pawn, g4 black knight, c3 white bishop, h3 white queen, a2 white pawn, b2 white pawn, c2 white bishop, f2 white pawn, g2 white pawn, h2 white pawn, d1 white rook, f1 white rook, g1 white king

Position after 20...Ng4

In the game Menchik–Graf, Semmering 1937, Graf resigned after 21.Rd7, deflecting Black's queen. (If 21...Qxd7, then 22.Qxh5 with mate to follow; 21.Qxh5 immediately wins only a pawn after 21...Qxh2+.)

Ivkov vs. Taimanov, 1956

Position: f6 black pawn, h6 white pawn, d5 black king, f5 white knight, g5 black knight, e4 black pawn, g4 white pawn, a2 white pawn, e2 white king

Final position after 49.h6

Often a wing pawn serves as a decoy in endgames. In the game Ivkov–Taimanov, Belgrade 1956, Black resigned in the position shown because White has an easy win by using his passed a2-pawn as a decoy to lure Black's king away from the center and to the queenside, allowing easy promotion of the h6-pawn.

== See also ==
- Overloading
