= Block (chess) =

Chess tactic

Position: e8 black rook, g8 black king, c7 white rook, f7 black pawn, g7 black pawn, h7 black pawn, a5 white bishop, c5 black knight, e5 black queen, e4 black cross, h3 white pawn, f2 white pawn, g2 white pawn, e1 white rook, g1 white king

Black to move can play Ne4 to block the white rook's attack on the queen.

A block is a defensive tactic in chess in response to an attack, consisting of interposing a piece between the opponent's attacking piece and the piece being attacked. This type of blocking will only work if the attacking piece is a type that can move linearly an indefinite number of squares such as a queen, rook, or bishop and there is at least one empty square in the line between the attacking and attacked piece. Blocking is not an option when the attacking piece is directly adjacent to the piece it is attacking, or when the attacking piece is a knight (because knights "jump over other pieces" and cannot be blocked). When an opponent's attack on a piece is blocked, the blocking piece is to some extent pinned, either relatively or absolutely, until a future move by either side allows it to be unpinned.

A check on a king by an opponent's queen, rook, or bishop can sometimes be blocked by moving a piece to a square in line in between the opponent's checking piece and the checked king. The blocking piece is then absolutely pinned to the king by the attacking piece.

Another type of interposing in chess can involve placing a piece between two opponent's pieces where one of those pieces is protecting the other, or they are both protecting each other. This chess tactic can be called interference.

== Blocking and initiative ==
When the attack cannot be ignored, the attacking player has the initiative. The defending player may be able to acquire the initiative by blocking and attacking at the same time, by attacking an undefended attacker with the blocking piece, with a discovered attack, or when the block is also a check or a cross-check.

== See also ==
- Blockade
- Chess tactic
- Interference
- Prophylaxis
