= Combination (chess) =

Chess tactic

In chess, a combination is a sequence of moves, often initiated by a sacrifice, which leaves the opponent few options and results in tangible gain. At most points in a chess game, each player has several reasonable options from which to choose, which makes it difficult to plan ahead except in strategic terms. Combinations, in contrast to the norm, are sufficiently forcing that one can calculate exactly how advantage will be achieved against any defense. Indeed, it is usually necessary to see several moves ahead in exact detail before launching a combination, or else the initial sacrifice should not be undertaken.

== Definition ==
In 1952/53, the editors of Shakhmaty v SSSR decided on this definition: A combination is a forced sequence of moves which uses tactical means and exploits specific peculiarities of the position to achieve a certain goal. (Golombek 1977)

Irving Chernev wrote:

What is a combination? A combination is a blend of ideas – pins, forks, discovered checks, double attacks – which endow the pieces with magical power. It is a series of staggering blows before the knockout. It is the climactic scene in the play appearing on the board. It is the touch of enchantment that gives life to inanimate pieces. It is all this and more – A combination is the heart of chess (Chernev 1960).

== Example ==
A combination is usually built out of two or more fundamental chess tactics such as forks, pins, skewers, undermining, discovered attacks, etc. Thus a combination is usually at least three moves long, but the longer it takes to recoup the initial sacrifice, the more impressive the combination.

Position: a8 black rook, c8 black bishop, a7 black pawn, d7 black pawn, g7 black king, h7 black pawn, b6 black pawn, c6 black knight, e6 black pawn, b4 white pawn, c4 white pawn, a3 white pawn, d3 white king, f3 black rook, c2 white queen, h2 white pawn, a1 white rook, f1 white bishop

White to play

The position shown is from G. Stepanov–Peter Romanovsky, Leningrad 1926, and begins a combination which illustrates several forks and skewers. Black has just played

1... Rxf3+

Retreating with 2.Ke2 would allow 2...Nd4+, a royal fork attacking both White's king and queen and winning the queen. Similarly, 2.Kd2 would allow 2...Rf2+ (skewering the white king and queen) 3.Be2 Rxe2+! 4.Kxe2 Nd4+, again winning the queen. White accordingly chose

2. Ke4

but after

2... d5+!

White resigned. White cannot take the black rook since that loses his queen to the fork 3...Nd4+, but the alternative 3.cxd5 exd5+ 4.Kxd5 (again, taking the rook loses the queen to the fork 4...Nd4+) Be6+ would leave White with no good defense. Taking the bishop with 5.Kxe6 allows the long-threatened fork 5...Nd4+, while taking the knight with 5.Kxc6 allows the skewer 5...Rc8+ followed by 6...Rxc2. Retreating with 5.Ke4 permits the black bishop to skewer the white king and queen with 5...Bf5+, so White has only one option left: 5.Kd6.

After 5.Kd6, Black would have played 5...Rd8+. White still cannot take the knight for exactly the same reason as before, and 6.Kxe6 allows checkmate in one move with 6...Rf6#, which leaves one legal move, namely 6.Kc7, but then 6...Rf7+ absolutely forces the white king to take the black knight, allowing the skewer 7...Rc8+ followed by 8...Rxc2.

== See also ==
- Chess tactics
- Zwischenzug
