= Windmill (chess) =

Chess tactic

In chess, a windmill (or seesaw) is a tactic in which a piece repeatedly gains material while simultaneously creating an inescapable series of alternating direct and discovered checks. Because the opponent must attend to check every move, they are unable to prevent their pieces from being captured; thus, windmills, while very rare, tend to be extremely powerful.

A windmill most commonly consists of a rook supported by a bishop. The bishop typically sits on the long diagonal (see Fianchetto), while the rook moves to the seventh (White) or second (Black) rank and checks the king, who is forced to the corner due to a friendly piece (usually a knight, but it can also be another rook) blocking it. Moving the rook leads to a discovered check by the bishop, giving the player a tempo by forcing their opponent to move the king. The rook then moves back to its original spot, and the process repeats until no more pieces can be captured. Windmills can also be done with other pieces, as seen in the Game of the Century.

== Examples ==
=== Torre vs. Lasker ===
Position: a8 black rook, e8 black rook, f8 black knight, g8 black king, a7 black pawn, b7 black bishop, f7 black pawn, g7 black pawn, d6 black pawn, e6 black pawn, h6 black pawn, b5 black queen, g5 white bishop, h5 white queen, b4 white pawn, d4 white pawn, e3 white knight, g3 white rook, a2 white pawn, f2 white pawn, g2 white pawn, h2 white pawn, e1 white rook, g1 white king

White to make his 25th move

In the position diagrammed, from the game Carlos Torre–Emanuel Lasker, Moscow 1925, White sacrifices his queen in order to set up the windmill:

25. Bf6!!

Black must accept the sacrifice, as his own queen is unprotected, 25...g5 26.Qxh6 leads to unstoppable mate on g7 or h8, and any other attempt to stop the windmill would simply give White the queen.

25... Qxh5 26. Rxg7+ Kh8 27. Rxf7+

White gives discovered check by the bishop.

27... Kg8 28. Rg7+ Kh8 29. Rxb7+

White simply repeats the checking cycle, capturing as many pieces as he can with his rook.

29... Kg8 30. Rg7+ Kh8 31. Rg5+ Kh7 32. Rxh5

White concludes the windmill by taking the black queen. Black forked White's rook and bishop with 32... Kg6, but White still emerged three pawns ahead after 33.Rh3 Kxf6 34.Rxh6+ and went on to win.

=== Byrne vs. Fischer ===
Position: a8 black rook, e8 black rook, g8 black king, a7 black pawn, b7 black pawn, f7 black pawn, g7 black bishop, h7 black pawn, b6 black queen, c6 black pawn, g6 black pawn, c5 white bishop, c4 white bishop, d4 white pawn, g4 black bishop, a3 white queen, c3 black knight, f3 white knight, a2 white pawn, f2 white pawn, g2 white pawn, h2 white pawn, d1 white rook, f1 white king, h1 white rook

Black to make his 17th move

The Game of the Century featured a windmill involving a knight and a bishop. The game continued from the diagrammed position as follows:

17... Be6!!

Black sacrifices his queen in order to initiate an attack.

18. Bxb6?

Accepting the sacrifice allows Black to set up the windmill.

18... Bxc4+ 19. Kg1 Ne2+ 20. Kf1 Nxd4+ 21. Kg1 Ne2+ 22. Kf1 Nc3+ 23. Kg1 axb6

Black emerges with an overwhelming advantage.
