= Ulf Andersson =

Swedish chess grandmaster (born 1951)

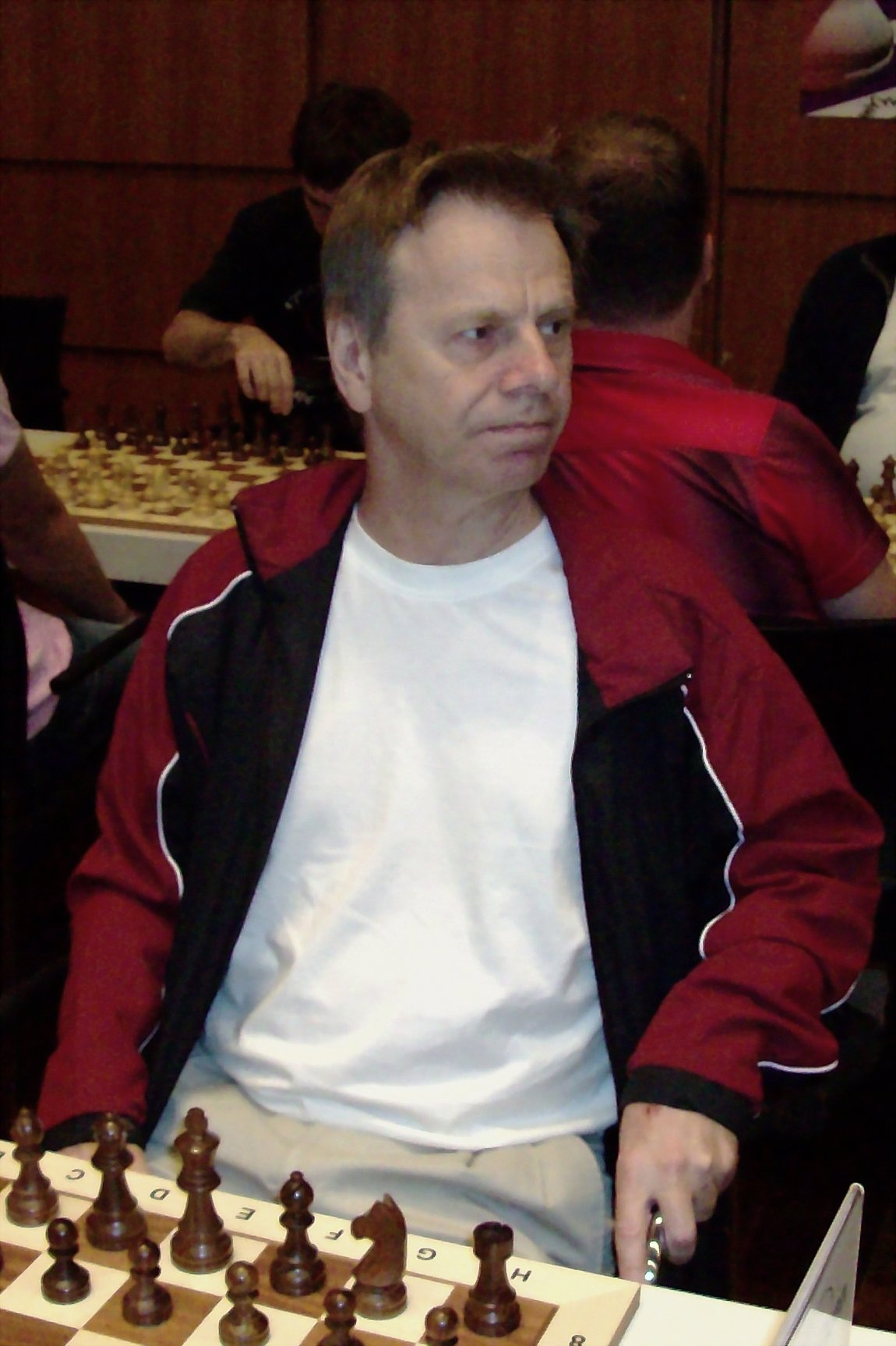
- Andersson in 2008

Personal information
- Born: 27 June 1951 (age 75) Västerås, Sweden

Chess career
- Country: Sweden
- Title: Grandmaster (1972); ICCF Grandmaster (1995)
- FIDE rating: 2519 (October 2026)
- Peak rating: 2655 (January 1997)
- Peak ranking: No. 4 (January 1983)
- ICCF rating: 2737 (April 2004)
- ICCF peak rating: 2821 (July 1998)

Ulf Andersson (born 27 June 1951) is a leading Swedish chess player. FIDE awarded him the International Master title in 1970 and the Grandmaster title in 1972.

== Chess career ==
At his peak, Andersson reached number four on the FIDE rating list. Tournaments which he has won or shared first include the 1969 Swedish Chess Championship, Göteborg 1971, Dortmund 1973, Camagüey 1974, Cienfuegos 1975, Belgrade 1977, Buenos Aires 1978, Hastings 1978–79, Phillips & Drew 1980, Johannesburg 1981, Phillips & Drew 1982, Turin 1982, Wijk aan Zee 1983, Reggio Emilia 1985, Rome 1985, and Rome 1986. Andersson drew a six-game match against former world champion Mikhail Tal in 1983, and played top board in the second USSR versus The Rest of The World Match in 1984. He led the Swedish Chess Olympiad Team during the 1970s and 1980s, and reached his best personal result in the 23rd Chess Olympiad in Buenos Aires 1978, where he finished in third place on first board, after Viktor Korchnoi and Orestes Rodríguez Vargas. Now in his seventies, Andersson still participates in tournaments from time to time.

== Playing style ==
Andersson is a very solid positional player. He draws a high percentage of his games against fellow grandmasters (Kaufeld & Kern 2011:12). He is renowned as a great player of endgames, especially rook endgames, and is famous for winning seemingly "unwinnable" endgames, often in very long games (Kaufeld & Kern 2011:167). Jacob Aagaard wrote about Andersson in his book Excelling at Chess, stating: "He is a very prophylactic player, seeing all kinds of tactics well in advance and avoiding pitfalls with great skill." Chess writer Dennis Monokroussos once remarked of Andersson's style,

For most of us, if we're playing a peer and major exchanges occur, a quick draw is the likely result ... for Andersson ... exchanges [are] often not the prelude to a quick draw but the signal that it [is] time for his opponent to start suffering.

== Correspondence play ==
Andersson began playing correspondence chess in 1995, and became a correspondence chess grandmaster that same year. Very few players in history have been as successful as Andersson at both forms of chess. For Ulf, who struggled to keep his nerves in check during over-the-board chess and often avoided lines with any risk of loss, it was a relief to have ample time to consider the subtle nuances of each move. His correspondence games tend to be very tactical, which contrasts sharply with his style of play over the board.

While in the process of winning in the 'Norwegian Postal Chess Federation – 50 Years' tournament, he attained the highest provisional rating in ICCF history, with a score of 2821 on the 1998 list. After earning an established rating in 2002, he finally reached the top of the official rating list (Kaufeld & Kern 2011:11).

With computer assistance slowly taking over the world of correspondence chess, Ulf was one of the few players still competing without it in the early 2000s. However, as postal play gave way to faster-paced email tournaments, he found himself having to send moves before feeling satisfied with them to avoid losing on time. Declining a wildcard for the world championship, he quietly finished his last correspondence game in 2003, reflecting in retrospect that he found it too demanding. Despite the changing times he lost only a single official game throughout his correspondence chess career, to Hans-Marcus Elwert in the Millennium Email Chess Tournament, and is as of 2024 still the highest rated inactive player on the ICCF rating list.

== Notable games ==
In the following game, using the "hedgehog" formation he in part originated (characterized by a half-open c-file and pawns on a6, b6, d6, and e6, knights on d7 and f6, bishops on b7 and e7, a rook on c8, and kingside castling), Andersson inflicts upon Anatoly Karpov the latter's first loss as world champion:

Position: h1 white king, d1 white rook, c1 white rook, h2 white pawn, g2 white pawn, f2 white queen, e2 white bishop, d2 white knight, b2 white pawn, f3 white pawn, e3 white bishop, c3 white knight, a3 white pawn, e4 white pawn, c4 white pawn, h6 black pawn, f6 black knight, e6 black pawn, d6 black pawn, b6 black pawn, a6 black pawn, g7 black pawn, f7 black pawn, d7 black knight, g8 black king, f8 black bishop, e8 black rook, d8 black rook, b8 black queen, a8 black bishop

Position after 24.a3
Karpov vs. Andersson, Milan 1975
1.e4 c5 2.Nf3 e6 3.d4 cxd4 4.Nxd4 Nc6 5.Nb5 d6 6.c4 Nf6 7.N1c3 a6 8.Na3 Be7 9.Be2 0-0 10.0-0 b6 11.Be3 Bb7 12.Rc1 Re8 13.Qb3 Nd7 14.Rfd1 Rc8 15.Rd2 Qc7 16.Qd1 Qb8 17.f3 Ba8 18.Qf1 Nce5 19.Nab1 Nf6 20.Kh1 h6 21.Rdd1 Bf8 22.Nd2 Rcd8 23.Qf2 Ned7 24.a3 (diagram) d5 25.cxd5 exd5 26.exd5 Bd6 27.Nf1 Rxe3 (an exchange sacrifice) 28.Nxe3 Bxh2 29.Nf1 Bf4 30.Rc2 b5 31.Bd3 Nb6 32.Be4 Nc4 33.a4 Re8 34.axb5 axb5 35.Re2 Be5 36.Qc5 Nd6 37.Na2 Ndxe4 38.fxe4 Bd6 39.Qc2 Re5 40.g3 Qe8 41.Rde1 Bb7 42.Kg1 Nh7 43.Nc1 Ng5 44.Nd2 Bb4 45.Kf2 Bxd2 46.Rxd2 Nxe4+ 47.Rxe4 Rxe4 48.Ne2 Bc8 49.Nc3 Re1 50.Ne2 Ra1 51.Rd4 Qd8 52.Qc6 Bd7 53.Qd6 Qe8 54.Qf4 Qc8 55.b4 Bh3 56.Qe4 Bf5 57.Qe3 Qc2 58.g4 Bd7 59.Qe4 Qb3 60.Qd3 Qb2 61.Qe4 Ra8 62.Qe3 Ra2 63.d6 Ra8 64.Re4 Bc6 65.Qd4 Qb1 66.Re7 Qh1 67.Qf4 Qg2+ 68.Ke1 Ra1+ 69.Kd2 Qd5+ 70.Qd4 Ra2+ 71.Kc3 Qf3+ 72.Re3 Ra3+ 73.Kd2 Ra2+ 74.Ke1 Qh1+ 75.Kf2 Qg2+ 76.Ke1 Qh1+ 77.Kf2 Ra1 78.Rc3 Qg2+ 79.Ke3 Qf3+ 0–1 (Kaufeld & Kern 2011:115–18)
