= Undermining (chess) =

Chess tactic

Kramnik vs. Topalov, 2004

Position: e7 black king, f7 black pawn, b6 black rook, d6 black pawn, g6 black pawn, b5 black pawn, e5 black pawn, g5 black bishop, h5 black pawn, a4 black knight, a3 white rook, f3 white pawn, a2 white pawn, b2 white pawn, e2 white bishop, g2 white pawn, h2 white pawn, b1 white king, h1 white rook

White to move

Undermining (also known as removal of the guard, or removing the defender) is a chess tactic in which a defensive piece is captured, leaving one of the opponent's pieces undefended or under-defended. The opponent has the unpalatable choice of recapturing or saving the undefended piece. A possible response is to sacrifice the piece whose defense was undermined before capturing the piece which just took the defender.

== Example ==
Kramnik–Topalov in the seventh round of the 2004 Linares chess tournament reached the diagrammed position with White to play. The black knight on a4 is defended only by the black pawn on b5. White undermined the knight with 1. Bxb5. The game continued 1... Rxb5 2. Rxa4, with a net material gain of a pawn for White.

Black may attempt 1...Nxb2?, disposing of the unguarded knight and hoping for 2.Kxb2 Rxb5+ to regain the lost pawn. After 2.Rb3, however, Black can only save the knight with 2...Rxb5 3.Rxb5, leaving White an exchange up instead of just a pawn.

== See also ==
- Deflection (chess)
