= Interference (chess) =

Chess tactic

Example of interference

Position: a8 black rook, e8 black king, f8 black bishop, h8 black rook, a7 black pawn, b7 black pawn, c7 black pawn, e7 black pawn, f7 black pawn, h7 black pawn, c6 black knight, g6 black bishop, a5 black queen, d5 white knight, g5 white pawn, e4 black pawn, f4 white pawn, h4 white queen, e3 white bishop, g3 white knight, a2 white pawn, b2 white pawn, c2 white pawn, h2 white pawn, d1 white rook, f1 white rook, g1 white king

In the Blackmar–Diemer Gambit, Vienna Defense, after 1.d4 d5 2.e4 dxe4 3.Nc3 Nf6 4.f3 Bf5 5.g4 Bd7 6.g5 Nh5 7.f4 g6 8.Be2 Bf5 9.Bxh5 gxh5 10.Qxh5 Qxd4 11.Nge2 Qd7 12.Be3 Bg6 13.Qh4 Nc6 14.Rd1 Qf5 15.Ng3 Qa5 16.0-0 Qb4 17.Nd5 Qa5, the interference move 19.Bb6 simultaneously threatens 20.Nxc7# and 20.Bxa5, winning Black's queen.

In the game of chess, interference occurs when the line between an attacked piece and its defender is interrupted by sacrificially interposing a piece. It is a chess tactic which rarely arises and is therefore often overlooked. Opportunities for interference are rare because the defended object must be more valuable than the sacrificed piece, and the interposition must itself present a threat. Huczek defines interference as a tactic involving blocking moves that obstruct lines of attack. This definition may be expanded by including blocking moves that disrupt lines of defense.

== Examples ==
Diagram A

Position: c8 black king, d8 black rook, f8 black bishop, a7 black pawn, b7 black pawn, c7 black pawn, h7 black pawn, g6 black pawn, e5 white pawn, f5 white knight, h3 white pawn, a2 white pawn, d2 black queen, e2 white queen, f2 white pawn, g2 white pawn, e1 white rook, g1 white king

White to move

In diagram A, White to play will apparently be obliged to retreat the knight from f5, because the squares to which it could advance are all guarded. The interference move 1.Nd6+, however, interrupts the black rook's defense of the black queen. If Black plays either 1...cxd6 or 1...Bxd6, White will capture Black's queen. Therefore, Black has no better play than 1...Rxd6 2.exd6 Qxe2 3.Rxe2 Bxd6, conceding the exchange for a pawn.

A more subtle example of interference occurs when the interposing piece interrupts two lines simultaneously. In this case, the moving piece does not have to pose a threat by itself. Instead, it makes the opponent "trip over their own feet" because capturing the offending piece will necessarily break one line of defense or the other.

Diagram B

Position: b8 white rook, d8 black rook, a7 white pawn, f7 black pawn, h7 black king, g6 black pawn, h6 black pawn, f5 black knight, b4 white knight, e4 black bishop, a3 white king, b3 white pawn, b2 white bishop, c2 white pawn, d2 black rook, h2 white pawn

White to move

In diagram B, White is at a material disadvantage and cannot promote the a-pawn because the black bishop guards the promotion square. The move 1.Nd5!, however, interferes with the bishop and with the black rooks' defense of each other. If 1...Bxd5, 2.Rxd8 is crushing. If 1...R8xd5, then 2.Rh8 mate. The best Black can do is 1...R2xd5, interfering with the bishop's guard of a8 and permitting 2.a8=Q.

Although interferences are quite rare in actual play, they are a common theme in chess problems. The device in the diagram B example, in which a sacrifice occurs on the intersection of the defensive lines of two differently moving pieces, is known to problemists as a Novotny. Various other types of interference are given specific names in problem terminology, including the Grimshaw, Plachutta (where the two pieces both move orthogonally; see a good example by Tarrasch), anti-Bristol, Holzhausen and Wurzburg–Plachutta.

== See also ==
- Chess tactics
