= Check (chess) =

Chess position where the King is attacked

Position: c8 black rook, c6 black king, c2 white rook, e1 white king

Black's king is in check by the white rook, and must move immediately.

In chess and similar games, check is a condition that occurs when a player's king is under immediate threat of capture on the very next turn. A king so threatened is said to be in check. A player must get out of check if possible by moving the king to an unattacked square, interposing a piece between the threatening piece and the king, or capturing the threatening piece. If the player cannot remove the check by any of these options, or if using any of these options would result in the player being in check by another piece, the game ends in checkmate and the player loses. Players cannot make any move that puts their own king in check.

== Overview ==
Position: e8 black rook, c6 black king, e4 white bishop, e3 white king

Black must address the check from the bishop despite the pin against the white king.

Position: b8 black king, g6 black rook, e4 black bishop, h2 white pawn, h1 white king

White has been checkmated. The king cannot escape check and White has lost the game.

A check is the result of a move that places the opposing king under an immediate threat of capture by one (or, in rare cases, two) of the player's pieces. Making a move that checks is sometimes called "giving check". Even if a piece is pinned against the player's own king, it may still give check. For example, in the diagrammed position, White has just played Be4+, simultaneously giving check and blocking the check from Black's rook. Black must now address the check; the fact that the bishop cannot legally move is irrelevant. If the king is in check and the checked player has no legal move to get out of check, the king is checkmated and the player loses.

Under the standard rules of chess, a player may not make any move that places or leaves their king in check. A player may move the king, capture the threatening piece, or block the check with another piece. A king cannot itself directly check the opposing king, since this would place the first king in check as well. A move of the king could expose the opposing king to a discovered check (and, rarely, checkmate) by another piece, however.

In fast chess, depending on the rules in effect, placing or leaving one's king in check may result in immediate loss of the game. If it does not, then the move is simply undone, and the other player usually receives extra time as a penalty to the player who failed to notice the check.

== Getting out of check ==
There may be up to three ways to get a king out of a single check (check delivered by just one enemy piece):

1. Capturing the checking piece. This is done with either the king or another piece, but the king cannot be placed in check from a different piece in the process.
2. Moving the king. The king is moved to an adjacent square where it is not in check. The king is not allowed to castle when it is in check.
3. Blocking the check. Also called interposing, this is possible only if the checking piece is a queen, rook, or bishop and there is at least one empty square in the line between the checking piece and the checked king. Blocking a check is done by moving a piece to one such empty square. (The blocking piece is then pinned to the king by the attacking piece.)

Position: h8 black king, d7 white pawn, e7 black cross, c6 white rook, d6 black cross, e6 white king, e5 black cross, b4 white knight, a2 black bishop, f1 black rook

White is in check. The king can get out of check in three ways.

In the position in the diagram, White can get out of check by any of three methods:

1. Capturing the attacking piece with the move Nxa2.
2. Moving the king to any unattacked square (marked with "x"); namely, Kd6, Ke5, or Ke7.
3. Blocking the check with the move Rc4 or Nd5.

If a king is placed in double check, the king must get out of both checks on the following move. Since it is impossible to capture both checking pieces or block both lines of attack in a single move, a double check can be escaped only by moving the king.

== Types of checks ==
Sometimes a given check is part of a chess tactic such as a fork, a skewer, or a discovered attack on another piece. In some cases, a check can be used to defend against such tactics.

There are also a few more special types of check:

- Discovered check. A discovered check is similar to any other type of discovered attack except that it is a discovered attack on the opposing king. In a discovered check, a piece moves out of the line of attack by another piece so that this other piece (which can be a queen, rook, or bishop) is then checking the opponent's king. A discovered check could be a tactic in itself because the piece that moved could attack or otherwise threaten another piece. The opponent has to get out of the discovered check on the following move and may not be able to also thwart the attack by the other piece that moved.
- Double check. A double check is a check from two pieces to the opponent's king in a single move. This happens when a moved piece attacks the king, resulting in a second piece giving check by discovered check. It can also happen, though very rarely, when an en passant capture opens two lines of attack simultaneously. A double check cannot be blocked, nor can it be met by capturing one of the checking pieces (unless the king itself makes the capture), because both checking pieces cannot be captured or blocked in one move. Therefore, a double check forces the king to make a move. In algebraic chess notation, a double check move is sometimes notated "++" after the written move in place of the usual "+", although "++" has been used to indicate checkmate (along with "#"). (Note: C.13 in Appendix C. Algebraic Notation in FIDE Laws of Chess)
- Cross-check. When a check is answered by a check, particularly when this second check is delivered by a piece blocking the first, it is called a cross-check. In fact, a "cross-checkmate" is also possible in that way (that is, to answer a check with a checkmate); but since no such term is in common use, it would be called cross-check as well.

== Announcing check and notation ==
=== History ===
The idea of warning that the king was under attack (announcing "check" in modern terminology) is present in the earliest descriptions of chess rules, in Persian/Arabian manuscripts. This was done to avoid the early and accidental end of a game. Later the Persians added the additional rule that a king could not be moved into check or left in check. As a result, the king could not be captured (Davidson 1949:22).

In this usage, the words "check" and "chess" come via Arabic from Persian shāh, meaning 'king' or 'monarch' (Murray 2012:159).

Less commonly (and obsolete), the warning garde can be said when a player directly attacks the opponent's queen in a similar way. This was mostly abandoned in the 19th century (Hooper & Whyld 1992:74). A move can be both check and garde simultaneously. Before the queen acquired its current move (about 1495) the rook was the most powerful piece. At that time the term check-rook was used for a move that checked the king and attacked a rook at the same time (Hooper & Whyld 1992:75).

Until the early 20th century a player was expected to announce "check" when making a checking move, and some sources of rules even allowed a player to ignore an unannounced check (Hooper & Whyld 1992:74).

=== Modern practice ===
In informal games, most players still announce "check"; however, this is no longer required under the rules of chess and is not encouraged in formal games (Just & Burg 2003:28). In the FIDE rules for rapid chess, if a player leaves or places their king in check or commits any other illegal move, their opponent can claim a win.

In algebraic chess notation, a "+" is normally written after a checking move. A minority of publications, most notably ECO, omit any mention of check.

== Checking in tactics and strategy ==
Sometimes checking an opponent provides no benefit to the checking player. This is called a useless check and it may even provide the checked opponent with a tempo (move opportunity) to move the king into a safer position (Hooper & Whyld 1992:437). For example, 1.e4 e6 2.d4 Bb4+? does nothing for Black and in fact causes him to lose a tempo after 3.c3! A check given with the sole intention of delaying an inevitable defeat by one move is referred to as a spite check, and may be considered somewhat unsporting (Eade 2005:65).

There are many instances, however, when checking the opponent's king may be a useful tactic or part of a tactic, either in attacking or in defense. Checking is often used in combinations with many other tactics or simply to force an opponent into a position where their king can be checkmated, otherwise taken advantage of, or is otherwise worse for the opponent. Some attacks involve numerous checks to force an opponent into a losing position, especially when the king is exposed.

Some uses of checking:

- Repetitive checking to prevent losing the game (draw by perpetual check)
- Royal fork (fork of the king and queen) or other forks involving the king
- Forcing an exchange
- Preventing castling by forcing the king to move
- Opening a line of attack by another piece (discovered attack)
- Limiting the opponent's response to a move by moving with a discovered check
- Forcing the king to clear the way to capturing another piece (absolute skewer)
- Pushing a defending piece into an absolute pin
- Deflecting the king from protecting a piece or pawn
- Escaping a trap (e.g. a fork)
- Gaining a tempo
- Chasing the king to a location where it can be checkmated or the opponent must concede significant material to avoid checkmate (a king hunt)

== See also ==
- Atari in the game Go
- Checkmate
- Rules of chess
