= Exchange variation =

Type of chess opening

Position: a8 black rook, b8 black knight, c8 black bishop, d8 black queen, e8 black king, f8 black bishop, g8 black knight, h8 black rook, a7 black pawn, b7 black pawn, c7 black pawn, f7 black pawn, g7 black pawn, h7 black pawn, d5 black pawn, d4 white pawn, a2 white pawn, b2 white pawn, c2 white pawn, f2 white pawn, g2 white pawn, h2 white pawn, a1 white rook, b1 white knight, c1 white bishop, d1 white queen, e1 white king, f1 white bishop, g1 white knight, h1 white rook

French Defense, Exchange Variation

In chess, an exchange variation is a type of opening in which there is an early, voluntary exchange of pawns or pieces. Such variations are often quieter than other lines because the early release of tension minimizes the possibility of surprise tactics or sharp, forcing lines, particularly where it results in a symmetrical pawn structure.

== Intents and implications ==
White may choose an exchange variation as a relatively risk-free way to try to exploit White's first-move advantage. Players such as Mikhail Botvinnik and Yasser Seirawan used the Exchange Variation of the Slav Defense this way.

White may also play an exchange variation in an effort to draw the game. This approach is not without risks. International Master John L. Watson has written that in the Exchange Variation of the French Defense, "Black can always make the struggle an unbalanced one if he chooses". Moreover, playing so blatantly for a draw may place a psychological burden on White: "White has already ceded the advantage of the first move, and he knows it, whereas Black is challenged to find ways to seize the initiative."

Not all exchange variations are quiet; the Exchange Variation of the Grunfeld Defense is regarded as one of White's sharpest and most aggressive options, since it allows White to build up a massive pawn center, which Black will try to undermine. The Exchange Variation of the Queen's Gambit Declined often involves attacks by one or both sides on the enemy king.

Exchange variations involving the exchange of pawns often lead to symmetrical central pawn structures, as in the Slav Defense and the French Defense, among others. The resulting pawn structures may also be asymmetrical, as in the Caro–Kann Defense and Queen's Gambit Declined. In the Ruy Lopez, Exchange Variation pieces (White's bishop and Black's knight) rather than pawns are traded. In the Exchange Variation of the Grunfeld Defense, both a pair of pawns and a pair of knights are traded.

The diagram illustrated shows a position in the Exchange Variation of the French Defense after the moves 1.e4 e6 2.d4 d5 3.exd5 exd5. The position is completely symmetrical and White's advantage is limited to his right to move. The Exchange French is usually regarded as a passive alternative selected by a White player eager for a draw, but Paul Morphy and more recently Garry Kasparov have used it as a winning try.

== Openings with exchange variations ==
- Caro–Kann Defense (1.e4 c6 2.d4 d5 3.exd5 cxd5)
- French Defense (1.e4 e6 2.d4 d5 3.exd5 exd5)
- Ruy Lopez, Exchange Variation (1.e4 e5 2.Nf3 Nc6 3.Bb5 a6 4.Bxc6; deferred exchange variations are also known, such as 4.Ba4 Nf6 5.0-0 Be7 6.Bxc6, the so-called Delayed Exchange Ruy Lopez Deferred (DERLD))
- Alekhine Defense (1.e4 Nf6 2.e5 Nd5 3.d4 d6 4.c4 Nb6 5.exd6)
- Queen's Gambit Declined (1.d4 d5 2.c4 e6 3.cxd5 exd5; often White delays the exchange for one or more moves)
- Slav Defense (1.d4 d5 2.c4 c6 3.cxd5 cxd5)
- King's Indian Defense (1.d4 Nf6 2.c4 g6 3.Nc3 Bg7 4.e4 d6 5.Nf3 0-0 6.Be2 e5 7.dxe5 dxe5)
- Grünfeld Defense (1.d4 Nf6 2.c4 g6 3.Nc3 d5 4.cxd5 Nxd5 5.e4 Nxc3 6.bxc3)
