= Exchange (chess) =

Chess term for a series of moves in which players capture each other's pieces

In chess, an exchange or trade of chess pieces is a series of closely related moves, typically sequential, in which the two players capture each other's pieces. Any type of pieces except the kings may possibly be captured in an exchange, although a king can capture an opponent's piece. Either the player of the white or the black pieces may make the first capture of the other player's piece in an exchange, followed by the other player capturing a piece of the first player, often referred to as a recapture. Exchanges occur very frequently in chess, in almost every game and usually multiple times per game. Exchanges are often related to the tactics or strategy in a chess game, but often simply occur over the course of a game.

Commonly, the word "exchange" is used when the pieces exchanged are of the same type or of about equal value, which is an even exchange. According to chess tactics, a bishop and a knight are usually of about equal value. If the values of the pieces exchanged are not equal, then the player who captures the higher-valued piece can be said to be up the exchange or wins the exchange, while the opponent who captures the lower-valued piece is down the exchange or loses the exchange.

The exchange of a rook for bishop or knight is an uneven exchange because a rook is generally more valuable than a bishop or knight. A minor exchange is a less commonly used term which refers to the exchange of a bishop for a knight.

== General discussion ==
A player's objective in a chess game is to checkmate the opponent's king and/or to avoid checkmate of his own king. In this ultimate sense, the value of chess pieces remaining in a game does not matter. Although no official score is kept of the value of pieces on the board for each player, much experience in chess play has determined approximate average strategic and tactical value of various pieces relative to a pawn, which is given a value of 1. Bishops and knights have about the same value at 3, rooks are valued at about 5, and a queen is valued at about 9. Since the king is indispensable, it has infinite value. Pieces, especially as distinguished by their value, are often referred to collectively as material in chess. These values are not absolute because the usefulness of a piece also depends on its position in a particular game, commonly in a way hard to quantify. For example, an advanced passed pawn with a good probability of promotion is commonly more valuable in a particular situation than a backward or isolated pawn that is not a passed pawn.

A forced exchange is an exchange in a position where one of the players is required to initiate or undergo an exchange, either because no alternative play is allowed by chess rules or because the consequence of not making the exchange would be unacceptably detrimental to that player's game. Many exchanges can be offered, but they are not forced. In such cases, the player presented with the possibility of an exchange may decide to make the initial capture, may decline making the initial capture, or may sometimes try to avoid the exchange. The player can weigh the advantages and disadvantages of each move to decide. For a prospective uneven exchange, the values of the pieces are often the deciding factor.

Chess positions are often set up where a player's piece on a specific square is defended by one or more of his other pieces. This typically means that if an opponent's piece captures the defended piece, the capturing piece would be subject to recapture by a defending piece (defender). An opponent's piece in a position to capture a given piece could be considered an attacking piece (attacker). Positions could develop where a player's piece on a square has one or more attackers and one or more defenders. This is a common way in which exchanges could occur, although there are other ways also.

In such positions, a player with the attacking piece(s) may decide whether it is worthwhile for him to initiate a capture likely to result in recapture, likely decided by the value of the pieces to be taken in the ensuing exchange. Pinned pieces often cannot be counted on being attackers or defenders.

In chess, a sacrifice is the deliberate giving up of a piece by a player, allowing or forcing an opponent to capture the piece or exchange it for a lower value piece.

In a desperado situation, a trapped piece which would inevitably be lost can sometimes be exchanged for another piece, even if it has lower value, in order to minimize net material loss for the player having the inevitably lost piece.

== Exchanges in tactics and strategy ==
Exchanges of chess pieces are commonly involved in chess tactics and strategy.

=== Tactics ===
Exchanges can appear in connection with practically any kind of attacking or defensive chess tactic or combination of tactics. Such tactics can involve checkmating the opponent, avoiding checkmate, gaining a material advantage, avoid losing more material than necessary, helping a pawn to promote, preventing an opponent's pawn promotion, or setting up a draw by any of a couple methods. Some tactics can lead to draw by stalemate, threefold repetition, or insufficient material to checkmate. For example, a player with a king and rook against an opponent with a king, rook, and bishop or knight may try to exchange rooks leading to a draw because a king and lone bishop or knight cannot force checkmate. Often an exchange or a series of them are used to set up a tactic. Often an attacking player initiates an attack by making the first capture in a series of exchanges leading to a tactical trap; the opponent recaptures to avoid material loss but can fall prey to the trap.

=== Strategy ===
Exchanges are often made to try to improve a position from a strategic point of view. Since positional advantages are often smaller than those due to difference in material value, exchanges to gain a positional advantage are commonly even exchanges in terms of material.

A player may undertake an exchange to capture an opponent's piece having better positional value than the piece that will be lost. For example, even if overall material count is equal in a certain situation, some players may consider that having two bishops, which can cover both dark and light squares, is advantageous over having just one bishop which can cover only half the squares, and so may exchange or avoid exchange to obtain or maintain such an advantage. A player may decide to take an opponent's well-posted or well-developed pieces in exchange for undeveloped, poorly developed, immobile, or otherwise poorly posted pieces of his/her own. Some may consider a bishop to have slightly more value than a knight, especially in open positions, or consider that a knight is better than a bishop in closed positions, and may make or avoid exchanges accordingly. Exchanges may be made to clear out pieces to be relieved from cramped situations or incur other positional advantages or avoid positional disadvantages.

Pawn structure is commonly important in positional chess. Deficiencies in pawn structure can include having doubled pawns or isolated pawns. A positional advantage can be having a passed pawn. Exchanges of pawns or other pieces are often made or avoided to prevent such deficiencies or to obtain a pawn structure advantage. If an opponent moves a pawn into a position diagonally adjacent to a player's pawn, effectively offering an exchange of pawns, sometimes it is possible to avoid a disadvantageous pawn exchange by moving the attacked pawn directly forward instead of taking the offered pawn. However, one may also consider making exchanges of pawns or other pieces to open up a file for one's rooks and queen or opening up a diagonal for one's bishop and queen, even if a pawn deficiency is incurred.

If a player gains material superiority in a game, a strategy can involve making even exchanges to eliminate other pieces for simplification to make the superiority more decisive. The opponent with less material may try to avoid exchanges, but then the player with more material may try to force exchanges anyway.

Strong players commonly play a materially even game with each other, often clearing out their pieces with even exchanges to transition from middlegame to the endgame.

An exchange variation is a type of opening in which there is an early, voluntary exchange of pawns and/or other pieces.

== See also ==
- The exchange (chess)
