= Chess piece relative value =

Point-based valuation system for chess pieces

In chess, a relative value (or point value) is a numerical value conventionally assigned to each piece. Piece valuations have no role in the rules of chess but are useful as an aid to evaluating an exchange of pieces.

The best-known system assigns 1 point to a pawn, 3 points to a knight or bishop, 5 points to a rook, and 9 points to the queen. For instance, sacrificing a knight or bishop under such an evaluation can still be considered a fair exchange if one can ensure the capture of three or more pawns in return. But valuation systems provide only a rough guide; a piece's true value can vary significantly depending on its position relative to all other pieces on the board.

== Standard valuations ==
Piece values are valid for, and conceptually averaged over, tactically "quiet" positions where immediate tactical gain of material will not happen.

The following table is the most common assignment of point values.

Piece	Pawn	Knight	Bishop	Rook	Queen
Value	1	3	3	5	9

The oldest derivation of the standard values is due to the Modenese School (Ercole del Rio, Giambattista Lolli, and Domenico Lorenzo Ponziani) in the 18th century and is partially based on the earlier work of Pietro Carrera. The value of the king is undefined as it cannot be captured or traded during the course of the game. Chess engines usually assign the king an arbitrary large value, such as 200 points or more, to indicate that loss of the king due to checkmate trumps all other considerations. During the endgame, as there is less danger of checkmate, the king will often assume a more active role. It is better at defending nearby pieces and pawns than the knight is and better at attacking them than the bishop is. Overall, this makes the king more powerful than a minor piece but less powerful than a rook, so its fighting value is about four points.

This system has some shortcomings. Combinations of pieces are not always worth the sum of their parts; for instance, two bishops on opposite colours are usually more valuable than a bishop and a knight, and three minor pieces (nine points) are often slightly stronger than two rooks (ten points) or a queen (nine points). Chess-variant theorist Ralph Betza identified the 'leveling effect', which reduces stronger pieces' value in the presence of opponent weaker pieces, as the latter interdict access to part of the board for the former to prevent the value difference from evaporating by 1-for-1 trading. This effect causes three queens to badly lose to seven knights (when both start behind a wall of pawns), even though three times nine is six more than seven times three. In a less exotic case, trading rooks in the presence of a queen-vs-3-minors imbalance favours the player with the queen, as the rooks hinder the movement of the queen more than of the minor pieces. Adding piece values is thus a first approximation, because piece cooperation must also be considered (e.g. opposite-coloured bishops cooperate very well) alongside each piece's mobility (e.g. a short-range piece far from the action on a large board is almost worthless).

The evaluation of the pieces depends on many parameters. Edward Lasker wrote, "It is difficult to compare the relative value of different pieces, as so much depends on the peculiarities of the position". Nevertheless, he valued the bishop and knight (minor pieces) equally, (Note: This seeming paradox results from the rook and bishop having almost equal mobility (14 vs. 13 squares in the centre of the board) but the bishop being colour-bound, while the rook is not.) the rook a minor piece plus one or two pawns, and the queen three minor pieces or two rooks. Kaufman suggests the following values in the middlegame:

Piece	Pawn	Knight	Bishop	Rook	Queen
Value	1	3.5	3.5	5.25	10

Paired bishops are worth 7.5 pawns—half a pawn more than the values of the bishops combined. Although it would be a very theoretical situation, there is no such bonus for a pair of same-coloured bishops. Per investigations by H. G. Muller, three light-squared bishops and one dark-squared bishop would receive only a 0.5-point bonus, while two on each colour would receive a 1-point bonus. More imbalanced combinations like 3:0 or 4:0 were not tested. The position of each piece also makes a significant difference: pawns near the edges are worth less than those near the centre, pawns close to promotion are worth far more, pieces controlling the centre are worth more than average, trapped pieces (such as bad bishops) are worth less, etc.

== Alternative valuations ==
Although the 1-3-3-5-9 system of point totals is the most commonly used, many other systems of valuing pieces have been proposed. Several systems treat the bishop as slightly more powerful than a knight.

Note: Where a value for the king is given, this is used when considering piece development, its power in the endgame, etc., unless otherwise noted.

Alternative systems with pawn = 1
					Source	Date	Comment
3.1	3.3	5.0	7.9	2.2	Sarratt	1813	(rounded) (Note: Pawns vary from 0.7 to 1.3.) (Note: Sarratt gives pawn = 2 at the start, 3.75 in the endgame; knight = 9.25; bishop = 9.75; rook = 15; queen = 23.75; king as attacking piece (in the endgame) = 6.5 . These values are divided by 3 and rounded.)
3.05	3.50	5.48	9.94		Philidor	1817	Staunton (1847) agrees; (Note: In the 1817 edition of Philidor's Studies of Chess (the editor, Pratt, gives the same values). Staunton in The Chess-Player's Handbook and a later book gave these values without explaining how they were obtained. He notes that piece values are dependent on the position and the phase of the game (the queen typically less valuable toward the endgame).)
3	3	5	10		Pratt	early 19th century	
3.5	3.5	5.7	10.3		Bilguer	1843	(rounded) (Note: Handbuch des Schachspiels (1843) gave pawn 1.5; knight 5.3; bishop 5.3; rook 8.6; queen 15.5.)
3	3	5	9–10	4	Lasker	1934	(Note: Lasker (1988), p. 73 gave: Knight = 3 pawns = 3; Bishop = knight = 3; Rook = knight plus 2 pawns = 5; Queen = 2 rooks = 3 knights = 9 or 10; King = knight + pawn = 4 (as an end-game capturing piece))
3.5	3.5	5.5	10		Euwe	1944	
3.5	3.5	5.0	8.5	4	Lasker	1947	(rounded) (Note: Kingside rooks and bishops are valued more, queenside ones less. Burgess (2000), p. 491) (Note: Lasker (1960), p. 107 gave these relative values for the early part of the game: rooks' pawns = 0.5 each; knights' pawns = 1.25 each; bishops' pawns = 1.5 each; central pawns = 2 each; knight = 4.5; queen's bishop = 4.5; king's bishop = 5; queen's rook = 6; king's rook: 7; queen = 11; Lasker adjusts some of these depending on the starting positions, with pawns nearer the centre, with bishops and rooks on the kingside, being worth more: centre (d/e-file) pawn = 1.5; a/h-file pawn = 0.5; c-file bishop = 3.5; f-file bishop = 3.75; a-file rook = 4.5; h-file rook = 5.25)
3	3+	5	9		Horowitz	1951	(Note: The bishop is "3 plus small fraction". Horowitz (1951), p. 11)
3	3.5	5	10		Turing	1953	
3.5	3.5–3.75	5	10	4	Evans	1958	(Note: Bishop is 3.75 if part of a bishop pair. Evans (1984), pp. 77, 80) (Note: Evans (1984) New Ideas in Chess, initially gives the bishop a value of 3.5 points (the same as a knight) but three pages later on the topic of the bishop pair states that theory says that it is actually worth about 0.25 point more.)
3.5	3.5	5	9.5		Styeklov (early Soviet chess program)	1961	
3	3.25	5	9	∞	Fischer	1972	(Note: The king's value represents its importance, not its strength. Fischer, Mosenfelder & Margulies (1972), p. 14)
3	3	4.25	8.5		European Committee on Computer Chess, Euwe	1970s	
3	3.15	4.5	9		Kasparov	1986	
3	3	5	9–10		Soviet chess encyclopedia	1990	(Note: A queen equals three minor pieces or two rooks.)
4	3.5	7	13.5	4	used by a computer	1992	(Note: Two bishops are worth more.)
3.20	3.33	5.10	8.80		Berliner	1999	(Note: Gets further adjustments for openness of position, rank & file. Berliner (1999), pp. 14–18)
3.25	3.25	5	9.75		Kaufman	1999	(Note: All values rounded to the nearest 0.25 points.) (Note: Add 0.5 points for paired bishops. Kaufman (1999)) (Note: Kaufman (1999) elaborates about how the values of knights and rooks change, depending on the number of pawns on the board: "A further refinement would be to raise the knight's value by 0.0625 (1/16) and lower the rook's value by 0.25 for each pawn above five of the side being valued, with the opposite adjustment for each pawn short of five.")
3.5	3.5	5	9		Kurzdorfer	2003	
3	3	4.5	9		another popular system	2004	
2.4	4.0	6.4	10.4	3.0	Yevgeny Gik	2004	(Note: Based on average mobility. Yevgeny Gik (2004) Soltis (2004), pp. 10–12 points out problems with this type of analysis.)
3.5	3.5	5.25	10		Kaufman	2011	(Note: Add 0.5 points for paired bishops. The values given apply to the middlegame phase only. Kaufman (2011)) (Note: Kaufman's experience in chess engine development helped him establishing a "scientific" method in calculating the relative value of the pieces. Work based on the study of thousands of games of elite players, analysed by the Chess engines: "A further refinement would be to raise the knight's value by 0.0625 (1/16) and lower the rook's value by 0.25 for each pawn above five of the side being valued, with the opposite adjustment for each pawn short of five." Kaufman (2011))
3.05	3.33	5.63	9.5		AlphaZero	2020	
3.25	3.5	5	9.75		Kaufman	2022	(Note: Middlegame values, with the caveat that rook pawns are only worth 0.75 instead of 1 (because they can only capture one way). Add 0.25 for the bishop pair.)
3.16	3.28	4.93	9.82		ubdip	2022	

=== Larry Kaufman's 2021 system ===
Larry Kaufman in 2021 gives a more detailed system based on his experience working with chess engines, depending on the presence or absence of queens. He uses "middlegame" to mean positions where both queens are on the board, "threshold" for positions where there is an imbalance (one queen versus none, or two queens versus one), and "endgame" for positions without queens. (Kaufman did not give the queen's value in the middlegame or endgame cases, since in these cases both sides have the same number of queens and their values cancel.)

Game phase									Comments
Game phase	pawn	knight	bishop	paired bishop bonus	first rook	second rook	queen	second queen	Comments
Middlegame	0.8	3.2	3.3	+0.3	4.7	4.5	–	–	both sides have a queen
Threshold	0.9	3.2	3.3	+0.4	4.8	4.9	9.4	8.7	one queen vs. zero, or two queens vs. one
Endgame	1.0	3.2	3.3	+0.5	5.3	5.0	–	–	no queens

The file of a pawn is also important, because this cannot change except by capture. According to Kaufman, the difference is small in the endgame (when queens are absent), but substantial in the middlegame (when queens are present):

Pawn values in the middlegame centre pawn = 1
centre pawn	bishop pawn	knight pawn	rook pawn
1	0.95	0.85	0.7

In conclusion:

- an unpaired bishop is slightly stronger than knight;
- a knight is superior to three average pawns, even in the endgame (situations like three passed pawns, especially if they are connected, would be exceptions);
- with queens on the board, a knight is worth four pawns (as commented by Vladimir Kramnik for a full board);
- the paired bishops are an advantage (as one can hide from one bishop by fixing king and pawns on the opposite colour, but not from both), and this advantage increases in the endgame;
- an extra rook is helpful in the "threshold" case, but not otherwise (because two rooks fighting against a queen benefit from the ability to defend each other, but minor pieces against a rook need a rook's help more than the rook needs the help of another rook);
- a second queen has lower value than normal.

In the endgame:

- R = B (unpaired) + 2P, and R > N + 2P (slightly); but if a rook is added on both sides, the situation favours the minor piece side
- 2N are only trivially better than R + P in the endgame (slightly worse if there are no other pieces), but adding a rook on both sides gives the knights a big advantage
- 2B ≈ R + 2P; adding a rook on both sides makes the bishops superior
- R + 2B + P ≈ 2R + N

In the threshold case (queen versus other pieces):

- Q ≥ 2R with all minor pieces still on the board, but Q + P = 2R with none of them (because the queen derives more advantage from cooperating with minor pieces than the rooks do)
- Q > R + N (or unpaired B) + P, even if another pair of rooks is added
- Q + minor ≈ R + 2B + P (slightly favouring the rook side)
- 3 minors > Q, especially if the minors include paired bishops. The difference is about a pawn if rooks are still on the board (because in this case they help the minors more than the queen); with all rooks still on the board, 2B + N > Q + P (slightly).

In the middlegame case:

- B > N (slightly)
- N = 4P
- The exchange is worth:
  - just under 2 pawns if it is unpaired R vs N, but less if the rook is paired, and a bit less still if the minor piece is an unpaired bishop
  - one pawn if it is paired R vs paired B
- 2B + P = R + N with extra rooks on the board
- 2N > R + 2P, especially with an extra pair of rooks
- 2B = R + 3P with extra rooks on the board

The above is written for around ten pawns on the board (a typical number); the rooks' value decreases as pawns are added and increases as pawns are removed.

Finally, Kaufman proposes a simplified version that avoids decimals: use the traditional values P = 1, N = 3, B = 3+, and R = 5 with queens off the board, but use P = 1, N = 4, B = 4+, R = 6, Q = 11 when at least one player has a queen. The point is that two minor pieces equal a rook and two pawns with queens on the board, but only a rook and one pawn without queens.

=== Hans Berliner's system ===
World Correspondence Chess Champion Hans Berliner gives the following valuations, based on experience and computer experiments:

Piece	Pawn	Knight	Bishop	Rook	Queen
Value	1	3.2	3.33	5.1	8.8

There are adjustments for the rank and file of a pawn and adjustments for the pieces depending on how open or closed the position is. Bishops, rooks, and queens gain up to 10% more value in open positions and lose up to 20% in closed positions. Knights gain up to 50% in closed positions and lose up to 30% in the corners and edges. The value of a good bishop may be 10% higher than that of a bad bishop.

from Berliner

Position: b7 black pawn, a6 black pawn, e6 black pawn, f6 black pawn, h6 black pawn, b3 white pawn, c3 white pawn, f3 white pawn, h3 white pawn, b2 white pawn, f2 white pawn, h2 white pawn

Different types of doubled pawns

There are different types of doubled pawns. In the diagram, White's doubled pawns on the b-file are the best situation in the diagram, since advancing the pawns and exchanging can get them un-doubled and mobile. The doubled b-file pawn is worth 0.75 points. If the black pawn on a6 were on c6, it would not be possible to dissolve the doubled pawn, and it would be worth only 0.5 points. The doubled pawn on f2 is worth about 0.5 points. The second white pawn on the h-file is worth only 0.33 points, and additional pawns on the file would be worth only 0.2 points.

Value of pawn advances (multiplier of base amount)
Rank	Isolated	Connected	Passed	Passed & connected
4	1.05	1.15	1.30	1.55
5	1.30	1.35	1.55	2.3
6	2.1	—	—	3.5

Value of non-passed pawn in the opening
Rank	a & h file	b & g file	c & f file	d & e file
2	0.90	0.95	1.05	1.10
3	0.90	0.95	1.05	1.15
4	0.90	0.95	1.10	1.20
5	0.97	1.03	1.17	1.27
6	1.06	1.12	1.25	1.40

in the endgame
Rank	a & h file	b & g file	c & f file	d & e file
2	1.20	1.05	0.95	0.90
3	1.20	1.05	0.95	0.90
4	1.25	1.10	1.00	0.95
5	1.33	1.17	1.07	1.00
6	1.45	1.29	1.16	1.05

== Changing valuations in the endgame ==
As already noted when the standard values were first formulated, pieces' relative strength change as a game progresses to the endgame. Pawns gain value as their path to promotion becomes clear, and strategy begins to revolve around either defending or capturing them before they can promote. Knights lose value as their unique mobility becomes a detriment to crossing an empty board. Rooks and (to a lesser extent) bishops gain value as lines of movement and attack are less obstructed. Queens slightly lose value as their high mobility becomes less proportionally useful when there are fewer pieces to attack and defend. Some examples follow.

- A queen versus two rooks
  - In the middlegame, they are equal
  - In the endgame, the two rooks are somewhat more powerful. With no other pieces on the board, two rooks are equal to a queen and a pawn
- A rook versus two minor pieces
  - In the opening and middlegame, a rook and two pawns are weaker than two bishops; equal to or slightly weaker than a bishop and knight; and equal to two knights
  - In the endgame, a rook and one pawn are equal to two knights; and equal to or slightly weaker than a bishop and knight. A rook and two pawns are equal to two bishops.
- Bishops are often more powerful than rooks in the opening. Rooks are usually more powerful than bishops in the middlegame, and rooks dominate the minor pieces in the endgame.
- As the tables in Berliner's system show, the values of pawns change dramatically in the endgame. In the opening and middlegame, pawns on the central files are more valuable. In the late middlegame and endgame the situation reverses, and pawns on the wings become more valuable due to their likelihood of becoming an outside passed pawn and threatening to promote. When there is about fourteen points of material on both sides, the value of pawns on any file is about equal. After that, wing pawns become more valuable.

C.J.S. Purdy gave minor pieces a value of 3 1/2 points in the opening and middlegame but 3 points in the endgame.

== Shortcomings of piece valuation systems ==
There are shortcomings of assigning each type of piece a single, static value.

- The real point value of an active piece greatly depends on the position.
- Two minor pieces plus two pawns are sometimes as good as a queen. Two rooks are sometimes better than a queen and pawn.
- Many of the systems have a 2-point difference between the rook and a minor piece, but most theorists put that difference at about 1 1/2 points (see The exchange (chess) § Value of the exchange).
- In some open positions, a rook plus a pair of bishops are stronger than two rooks plus a knight.

=== Example 1 ===
Silman, diagram 308

Position: a8 black rook, d8 black queen, f8 black rook, g8 black king, b7 black bishop, d7 black knight, e7 black pawn, f7 black pawn, g7 black bishop, h7 black pawn, a6 black pawn, f6 black knight, g6 black pawn, b5 black pawn, c5 black pawn, e5 white knight, d4 white pawn, b3 white bishop, c3 white knight, e3 white pawn, a2 white pawn, b2 white pawn, e2 white queen, f2 white pawn, g2 white pawn, h2 white pawn, a1 white rook, c1 white bishop, f1 white rook, g1 white king

White to play

Positions in which a bishop and knight can be exchanged for a rook and pawn are fairly common. In the diagrammed position, White should not do that, e.g.:

1. Nxf7? Rxf7
2. Bxf7+ Kxf7

This seems like an even exchange (6 points for 6 points), but it is not, as two minor pieces are better than a rook and pawn in the middlegame.

In most openings, two minor pieces are better than a rook and pawn and are usually at least as good as a rook and two pawns until the position is greatly simplified (i.e. late middlegame or endgame). Minor pieces get into play earlier than rooks, and they coordinate better, especially when there are many pieces and pawns on the board. On the other hand, rooks are usually blocked by pawns until later in the game. Pachman also notes that paired bishops are almost always better than a rook and pawn.

=== Example 2 ===
Silman, diagram 307

Position: a8 black rook, b8 black knight, d8 black queen, f8 black rook, c7 black pawn, e7 black pawn, f7 black pawn, g7 black king, h7 black pawn, a6 black pawn, g6 black pawn, b5 black pawn, d4 white pawn, b3 white pawn, c3 white knight, f3 white knight, b2 white pawn, f2 white pawn, g2 white pawn, h2 white pawn, a1 white rook, c1 white bishop, e1 white king, f1 white bishop, h1 white rook

Black to play

In this position, White has exchanged a queen and a pawn (10 points) for three minor pieces (9 points). White is better because three minor pieces are usually better than a queen because of their greater mobility, and Black's extra pawn is not important enough to change the situation. Three minor pieces are almost as strong as two rooks.

=== Example 3 ===
Reshko vs. Faibisovich, 1969

Position: b8 black rook, c8 black bishop, d8 black queen, e8 black knight, f8 black rook, g8 black king, e7 black pawn, f7 black pawn, h7 black pawn, a6 black pawn, d6 black pawn, g6 black pawn, c5 black pawn, c4 white pawn, e4 white pawn, f4 white pawn, c3 white bishop, d3 white pawn, g3 white pawn, h3 white pawn, b2 white pawn, d2 white queen, e2 white knight, g2 white bishop, a1 black queen, d1 white knight, e1 white rook, f1 white rook, g1 white king

Black to play

In this position, Black is ahead in material, but White is better. White's queenside is completely defended, and Black's additional queen has no target; additionally, White is much more active than Black and can gradually build up pressure on Black's weak kingside.

== Fairy pieces ==
In fairy chess, in general, the approximate value, $\ V\$, in centipawns of a short-range leaper with $\ N\$ moves on an 8×8 board is $\ V = 33\ N + 0.7\ {N}^2 ~.$ The quadratic term reflects the possibility of cooperation between moves.

If pieces are asymmetrical, moves going forward are about twice as valuable as moves going sideways or backward, presumably because enemy pieces can generally be found in the forward direction. Similarly, capturing moves are usually twice as valuable as noncapturing moves (of relevance for pieces that do not capture the same way they move). There also seems to be significant value in reaching different squares (e.g. ignoring the board edges, a king and knight both have eight moves, but in one or two moves a knight can reach 40 squares whereas a king can reach only 24). It is also valuable for a piece to have moves to squares that are orthogonally adjacent, as this enables it to wipe out lone passed pawns (and also checkmate the king, but this is less important as usually enough pawns survive to the late endgame to achieve checkmate via promotion). As many games are decided by promotion, the effectiveness of a piece in opposing or supporting pawns is a major part of its value.

An unexpected result from empirical computer studies is that the princess (a bishop+knight compound) and empress (a rook+knight compound) have almost exactly the same value, even though the lone rook is two pawns stronger than the lone bishop. The empress is about 0.5 pawns weaker than the queen, and the princess 0.75 pawns weaker than the queen. This does not appear to have much to do with the bishop's colourboundedness being masked in the compound, because adding a non-capturing backward step turns out to benefit the bishop about as much as the knight; and it also does not have much to do with the bishop's lack of mating potential being so masked, because adding a backward step (capturing and non-capturing) to the bishop benefits it about as much as adding such a step to the knight as well. A more likely explanation seems to be the large number of orthogonal contacts in the move pattern of the princess, with 16 such contacts for the princess compared to 8 for the empress and queen each: such orthogonal contacts would explain why even in cylindrical chess, the rook is still stronger than the bishop even though they now have the same mobility. This makes the princess extremely good at annihilating pawn chains, because it can attack a pawn as well as the square in front of it.

== See also ==
- Chess endgame – has material that justifies the common valuation system
- Compensation (chess)
- Evaluation function
- The exchange (chess) § Value of the exchange – discusses the difference between a rook and a minor piece

== Bibliography ==
- Aagaard, J. (2004). Excelling at Technical Chess. Everyman Chess. ISBN 978-1-85744-364-6.
- Alburt, Lev; Krogius, Nikolai (2005). Just the Facts: Winning endgame knowledge in one volume (2nd ed.). Chess Information and Research Center / distributed by W. W. Norton. ISBN 1-889323-15-2.
- Berliner, J. (1999). The System: A world champion's approach to chess. Gambit Publications. ISBN 1-901983-10-2.
- Brace, Edward (1977). An Illustrated Dictionary of Chess. Craftwell. ISBN 1-55521-394-4.
- Burgess, G. (2000). The Mammoth Book of Chess (2nd ed.). Carroll & Graf. ISBN 978-0-7867-0725-6.
- Capablanca, Jose; de Firmian, Nick (2006). Chess Fundamentals. Random House. ISBN 0-8129-3681-7. "Completely revised and updated for the 21st century"
- Carrera, Pietro (1617). Il Gioco degli Scacchi. Militello, IT: Giovanni de Roffi.
- Cazaux, Jean-Louis; Muller, Harm Geert (2023). Rapoport, Paul (ed.). More Chess & More than Chess. Toulouse, FR: Pionssimo. pp. 105–111. ISBN 978-1-4477-6560-8.
- Euwe, Max; Kramer, Hans (1994) [1944]. The Middlegame. Vol. 1. Hays. ISBN 978-1-880673-95-9.
- Evans, Larry (1984) [1958]. New Ideas in Chess (Dover reprint ed.). Pitman. ISBN 0-486-28305-4.
- Fine, Reuben; Benko, Pal (2003) [1941]. Basic Chess Endings. McKay. ISBN 0-8129-3493-8.
- Fischer, Bobby; Mosenfelder, Donn; Margulies, Stuart (1972). Bobby Fischer Teaches Chess. Bantam Books. ISBN 0-553-26315-3.
- Hooper, D.; Whyld, K. (1996) [1992]. The Oxford Companion to Chess (2nd ed.). Oxford University Press. ISBN 0-19-280049-3.
- Horowitz, I.A. (1951). How to Win in the Chess Openings. Cornerstone Library.
- Horowitz, I.A.; Rothenberg, P.L. (1963). The Complete Book of Chess. Collier.
- Kasparov, G. (1986). Kasparov Teaches Chess. Batsford. ISBN 0-7134-55268.
- Kaufeld, Jurgen; Kern, Guido (2011). Grandmaster Chess Strategy: What amateurs can learn from Ulf Andersson's positional masterpieces. New in Chess. ISBN 978-90-5691-346-5.
- Kaufman, L. (March 1999). "The Evaluation of Material Imbalances". Chess Life. Archived from the original on 2006-06-29 – via comcast.net.
- Kaufman, L. (2011). The Kaufman Repertoire for Black & White. New in Chess. ISBN 978-90-5691-371-7.
- Kaufman, Larry (2021). Chess Board Options. chapter 27.
- Kurzdorfer, Peter (2003). The Everything Chess Basics Book. United States Chess Federation via Adams Media. ISBN 978-1-58062-586-9 – via Internet Archive (archive.org).
- Lasker, E. (1959) [1915]. Chess Strategy (reprint ed.). Dover Publications. ISBN 0-486-20528-2 – via Internet Archive (archive.org).
- Lasker, E. (1988) [1934]. Lasker's Chess Primer (reprint ed.). Billings. ISBN 0-7134-6241-8.
- Lasker, Emanuel (1960) [1947]. Lasker's Manual of Chess (reprint ed.). Dover Publications. ISBN 0-486-20640-8.
- Levy, D.; Newborn, M. (1991). How Computers Play Chess. Computer Science Press. ISBN 0-7167-8121-2.
- Lolli, G. (1763). Osservazioni teorico-pratiche sopra il giuoco degli scacchi. Bologna, IT: Stamperia di S. Tommaso D'Aquino.
- Mayer, Steve (1997). Bishop versus Knight: The verdict. Batsford. ISBN 1-879479-73-7.
- Pachman, L. (1971). Modern Chess Strategy. Dover Publications. ISBN 978-0-486-20290-7.
- Polgar, S.; Truong, P. (2005). A World Champion's Guide to Chess. Random House. ISBN 978-0-8129-3653-7 – via Internet Archive (archive.org).
- Purdy, C.J.S. (2003). C.J.S. Purdy on the Endgame. Thinker's Press. ISBN 978-1-888710-03-8.
- Seirawan, Y.; Silman, J. (1990). Play Winning Chess. Microsoft Press. ISBN 1-55615-271-X.
- Seirawan, Y. (2003). Winning Chess Endings. Everyman Chess. ISBN 1-85744-348-9.
- Silman, J. (1998). The Complete Book of Chess Strategy: Grandmaster techniques from 'A' to 'Z'. Siles Press. ISBN 978-1-890085-01-8.
- Soltis, A. (2004). Rethinking the Chess Pieces. Batsford. ISBN 0-7134-8904-9.
- Staunton, Howard (1847). The Chess-Player's Handbook. Henry G. Bohn.
- Staunton, Howard (1870). The Blue Book of Chess. Porter & Coates – via gutenberg.org. "Teaching the rudiments of the game, and giving an analysis of all the recognized openings."
- Tomašev, Nenad; Paquet, Ulrich; Hassabis, Demis; Kramnik, Vladimir (15 September 2020). "Assessing game balance with AlphaZero: Exploring alternative rule sets in chess". arXiv:2009.04374 [cs.AI].
- Turing, Alan (1988) [1953]. "Chess". In Levy, David (ed.). Computer Chess Compendium. Springer Verlag. ISBN 0-387-91331-9.
- Ward, Chris (1996). Endgame Play. Batsford. ISBN 0-7134-7920-5.
- Watson, John (2006). Mastering the Chess Openings. Vol. 1. Gambit. ISBN 978-1-904600-60-2.
