= Deflection (chess) =

Chess tactic

Position: a8 black rook, b8 black knight, c8 black bishop, d8 black queen, e8 black king, f8 black bishop, h8 black rook, a7 black pawn, b7 black pawn, e7 black pawn, f7 white bishop, h7 black pawn, f6 black knight, g6 black pawn, c5 white pawn, c3 white knight, a2 white pawn, b2 white pawn, c2 white pawn, f2 white pawn, g2 white pawn, h2 white pawn, a1 white rook, c1 white bishop, d1 white queen, e1 white king, g1 white knight, h1 white rook

White's bishop has captured the pawn at f7, forcing Black's king to recapture the bishop, thereby leaving Black's queen undefended and lost on the next move.

Deflection in chess is a tactic that forces an opposing piece to leave the square, rank or file it occupies, thus exposing the king or a valuable piece. It is typically used in the context of a combination or attack, where the deflected piece is critical to the defence. Deflection may be used as a gambit to cause an opponent's piece to move to a less suitable square. Deflections are often used as part of a combination which may involve other types of chess tactics as well.

If the deflected piece happens to be an overworked piece then the opponent's defence instantly crumbles, making victory imminent to the one who employed the deflection.

== See also ==
- Overloading
- Sacrifice
