= Fork (chess) =

Chess piece attacking two or more pieces simultaneously

Position: a8 black rook, d7 black king, b6 white knight, g4 black pawn, f3 white rook, h3 white rook, c1 white king

The white knight forks Black's king and rook. Black's pawn forks the white rooks.

In chess, a fork is a tactic in which a piece attacks multiple enemy pieces simultaneously. The attacker usually aims to capture one of the forked pieces. The defender often cannot counter every threat. A fork is most effective when it is forcing, such as when the king is put in check.

== Terminology ==
A fork is an example of a double attack. The type of fork is named after the type of forking piece. For example, a fork by a knight is a knight fork. The attacked pieces are forked. If the king is one of the attacked pieces, the term absolute fork is sometimes used, while a fork not involving the enemy king is a relative fork.

A fork of the king and queen, the highest material-gaining fork possible, is sometimes called a royal fork. A fork of the enemy king, queen, and one (or both) rooks is sometimes called a grand fork. A knight fork of the enemy king, queen, and possibly other pieces is sometimes called a family fork or family check.

== Strategy ==
While any piece can deliver a fork, knights are particularly effective as the forking piece because they cannot be captured by the non-knight pieces they attack, and as a minor piece they are less valuable than rooks and queens.

Compared to forks by other pieces, a queen fork requires more specific conditions to be helpful due to the queen's higher value. A queen fork can often lead to material or positional gain, however, when the forked pieces are undefended, poorly coordinated, or when one piece is the king.

== Game examples ==
Tissir vs. Dreev, 2004

Position: a8 black rook, g8 black king, b7 black pawn, d7 black queen, f7 black pawn, g7 black bishop, h7 black pawn, g6 black pawn, c5 white pawn, d5 black pawn, a4 black pawn, e4 black knight, f4 white queen, a3 white pawn, f3 white pawn, a2 white bishop, d2 white bishop, g2 white pawn, h2 white pawn, c1 white rook, h1 white king

Position after 33.Qe5–f4

This example is from the first round of the FIDE World Chess Championship 2004 between Mohamed Tissir and Alexey Dreev. After

33... Nf2+ 34. Kg1 Nd3

White resigned. In the final position the black knight forks White's queen and rook; after the queen moves away, Black will win the exchange.

Soppe vs. Braga, 1998

Position: g8 black king, f7 black pawn, g7 black bishop, e6 black pawn, h6 black pawn, b5 black pawn, d5 black knight, e5 white knight, e4 black queen, g4 white pawn, b3 white pawn, h3 white pawn, f2 white pawn, c1 white bishop, d1 white queen, f1 white king

Position after 40.Nxe5

This example is from the ninth round of the Clarin GP Final between Guillermo Soppe and Fernando Braga. After

40... Qh1+

White resigned. The only move is 41.Ke2 which enables a royal fork with 41...Nc3+, winning the queen.

Position: a8 black rook, c8 black bishop, d8 black queen, e8 black king, f8 black bishop, h8 black rook, a7 black pawn, b7 black pawn, c7 black pawn, d7 black pawn, f7 black pawn, g7 black pawn, h7 black pawn, c6 black knight, f6 black knight, e5 black pawn, c4 white bishop, e4 white pawn, c3 white knight, f3 white knight, a2 white pawn, b2 white pawn, c2 white pawn, d2 white pawn, f2 white pawn, g2 white pawn, h2 white pawn, a1 white rook, c1 white bishop, d1 white queen, e1 white king, h1 white rook

Position after 4.Nc3. Black can play 4...Nxe4 since he has a fork trick.

Position: a8 black rook, c8 black bishop, d8 black queen, e8 black king, f8 black bishop, h8 black rook, a7 black pawn, b7 black pawn, c7 black pawn, f7 black pawn, g7 black pawn, h7 black pawn, c6 black knight, d5 black pawn, e5 black pawn, c4 white bishop, e4 white knight, f3 white knight, a2 white pawn, b2 white pawn, c2 white pawn, d2 white pawn, f2 white pawn, g2 white pawn, h2 white pawn, a1 white rook, c1 white bishop, d1 white queen, e1 white king, h1 white rook

After 4...Nxe4 5.Nxe4 d5, White is forked and Black will regain a piece.

In the Two Knights Defense (1.e4 e5 2.Nf3 Nc6 3.Bc4 Nf6) after 4.Nc3, Black can eliminate White's e4-pawn immediately with

4... Nxe4!

due to the fork trick

5. Nxe4 d5

regaining either the bishop or the knight.
