= The exchange (chess) =

Chess term for the exchange of a bishop or knight for a rook

In chess, the exchange is the material difference of a rook for a minor piece (i.e. a bishop or knight). Having a rook for a minor piece is generally advantageous, since the rook is usually more valuable. A player who has a rook for a minor piece is said to be up the exchange, and the other player is down the exchange. A player who wins a rook for a minor piece is said to have won the exchange, while the other player has lost the exchange. The opposing captures often happen on consecutive moves, but this is not strictly necessary. Although it is generally detrimental to lose the exchange, one may occasionally find reason to purposely do so; the result is termed an exchange sacrifice.

"The exchange" differs from the more general "exchange" or "an exchange", which refers to the loss and subsequent gain of arbitrary pieces; for example, to "exchange queens" would mean that each side's queen is captured.

The minor exchange is the exchange of a bishop for a knight. This term is rarely used.

== Value of the exchange ==
The value of the exchange (i.e. the difference between a rook and a minor piece) has been considered for decades. Siegbert Tarrasch put its value as 1½ pawns in the endgame, but not for the opening or the first part of the middlegame. That is widely accepted today, but Jacob Sarratt, Howard Staunton, and José Capablanca felt that the exchange was worth two pawns. Tigran Petrosian thought that one pawn was the right value. Wilhelm Steinitz said that a rook is slightly better than a knight and two pawns but slightly worse than a bishop and two pawns. Cecil Purdy said that the value depends on the total number of pawns on the board. The reason is that when there are many pawns, the rooks will have limited mobility because there will not be open files. The exchange is barely worth 1½ points when there are 14 or more pawns on the board. Only when there are ten or fewer pawns may the exchange be worth 2 points . Purdy gave the value as 1½ points in the opening and increasing to 2 points in the endgame. In the middlegame the value would be closer to 1½ than to 2. Edmar Mednis gave the value as 1½ in the endgame. Max Euwe put the value at 1½ in the middlegame and said that two pawns are more than sufficient compensation for the exchange. Larry Kaufman's computer research puts the value as 1¾ pawns, but only 1¼ pawns if the player with the minor piece has the bishop pair. Hans Berliner puts the difference between a rook and knight as 1.9 pawns and the difference between a rook and a bishop as 1.77 pawns. In practice, one pawn may be sufficient compensation for the loss of the exchange, whereas two pawns almost always is.

== In the endgame ==
In the middlegame, the advantage of the exchange is usually enough to win the game if the side with the rook has one or more pawns. In an endgame without pawns, the advantage of the exchange is normally not enough to win (see pawnless chess endgame). The most common exceptions when there are no pawns are (1) a rook versus a bishop in which the defending king is trapped in a corner of the same color as his bishop, (2) a knight separated from its king that may be cornered and lost, and (3) the king and knight are poorly placed.

In the endgame of a rook and a pawn versus a knight and a pawn, if the pawns are passed the rook is much stronger and should win. If the pawns are not passed, the side with knight has good drawing chances if its pieces are well-placed.

In the endgame of a rook and a pawn versus a bishop and pawn, if the pawns are on the same file, the bishop has good chances to draw if the pawns are blocked and the opposing pawn is on a square the bishop can attack; otherwise the rook usually wins. If the pawns are passed the rook normally wins. If the pawns are not passed and are on adjacent files, it is difficult to assess but the bishop may be able to draw.

Adams vs. Fine, 1940

Position: d8 black rook, f8 black king, a7 black pawn, f7 black pawn, h7 black pawn, b6 black pawn, c6 white bishop, g6 black pawn, c5 black pawn, d3 white pawn, a2 white pawn, b2 white pawn, c2 white pawn, d2 white king, g2 white pawn, h2 white pawn

Black to move wins

In an endgame with more pawns on the board (i.e. a rook and pawns versus a minor piece with the same number of pawns) the rook usually wins. This position is typical. The superior side should remember these things:

1. the main idea is to get the king through to capture opposing pawns
2. force as many opposing pawns as possible onto the same color square as the bishop
3. some pawn exchanges may be necessary to open files, but keep pawns on both sides of the board
4. try to keep the position unbalanced. A passed pawn almost immediately becomes a winning advantage.

If the minor piece has an extra pawn (i.e. one pawn for the exchange), the rook should win, but with difficulty. If the minor piece has two extra pawns, the endgame should be a draw.

== Exchange sacrifice ==
An exchange sacrifice occurs when one player voluntarily gives up a rook for a minor piece. It is often used to destroy the enemy pawn structure (as in several variations of the Sicilian Defence where Black captures a knight on c3 with a rook), to establish a minor piece on a strong square (often threatening the enemy king), to improve one's own pawn structure (creating, for example, connected passed pawns such as in A Yurgis–Botvinnik, 1931), or to gain time for development. The exchange sacrifice contrasts with other sacrifices in that during the early-middle to middle game the board is sufficiently crowded to where the rook is not as effective as an active knight or a good bishop; this is why such exchange sacrifices happen usually from moves 20 to 30, and rarely occur in the later moves. When they do occur in the endgame, it is usually to create and promote a passed pawn. Subsequently, the relative importance of the pieces might be different from the standardized Chess piece relative value system and takes advantage of the fluctuating values of the pieces during the progression of the game. The sacrifice might also be used to increase the influence of one's own minor pieces by eliminating opposition from their counterparts (such as in the Petrosian versus Spassky game below, where even a double exchange sacrifice was successful). A common example of this idea is the elimination an opponent's bishop, with the expectation that in doing so one's own bishop will increase in power from being unopposed on the color squares in which it resides. There is often more dynamic play and positional considerations such as pawn structure or piece placement compared to sacrifices due to a mating attack or a pawn sacrifice to gain the initiative. Sometimes the exchange can be sacrificed purely on long term positional objectives, as frequently demonstrated by former world champion Tigran Petrosian.

=== Sokolov vs. Kramnik ===
Sokolov vs. Kramnik

Position: d8 black rook, f8 black rook, g8 black king, a7 black pawn, b7 black bishop, c7 black bishop, h7 black pawn, b6 black queen, f6 black pawn, g6 black pawn, h6 white pawn, b5 white bishop, d5 white pawn, e4 white pawn, f4 white rook, f3 white knight, b2 white queen, f2 white pawn, g2 white pawn, c1 white rook, f1 white king

Position before 33.Rxc7!

In this 2004 game between Ivan Sokolov and World Champion Vladimir Kramnik, White gave up the exchange for a pawn to create two strong connected passed pawns. The game continued:

33. Rxc7! Qxc7
34. Rxf6 Rxf6
35. Qxf6 Rf8

and White won on move 41.

=== Reshevsky vs. Petrosian ===
Reshevsky vs. Petrosian

Position: d8 black rook, e8 black queen, g8 black king, e7 black rook, f7 black pawn, g7 black pawn, h7 black pawn, c6 black knight, g6 black bishop, a5 black pawn, b5 black pawn, e5 white pawn, c4 black pawn, d4 white pawn, f4 white queen, g4 white bishop, a3 white pawn, c3 white pawn, e3 white rook, b2 white bishop, g2 white pawn, h2 white pawn, e1 white rook, g1 white king

Position before 25...Re6!!

Tigran Petrosian, the World Champion from 1963 to 1969, was well known for his especially creative use of this device. He once responded (only half jokingly), when asked what was his favourite piece, as saying "The rook, because I can sacrifice it for minor pieces!" In the game Reshevsky versus Petrosian at the 1953 Candidates Tournament in Zurich, he sacrificed the exchange on move 25, only for his opponent to sacrifice it in return on move 30. This game is perhaps the most famous and most frequently taught example of the exchange sacrifice.

There are no open files in this position for the rooks to exploit. Black sacrificed the exchange with

25... Re6!!

With the rook not on e7, the black knight will be able to get to a strong outpost on d5. From there the knight will be attacking the pawn on c3, and if the white bishop on b2 does not move to d2, it will be of little use. In addition, it will be practically impossible to break Black's defense on the white squares. The next few moves were:

26. a4?! Ne7!
27. Bxe6 fxe6
28. Qf1! Nd5
29. Rf3 Bd3
30. Rxd3 cxd3

The game was drawn on move 41.

=== Petrosian vs. Spassky ===
Petrosian vs. Spassky, 1966

Position: a8 black rook, d8 black queen, f8 black rook, g8 black king, h7 black pawn, a6 black pawn, d6 black pawn, a5 black knight, b5 black pawn, c5 black pawn, d5 white pawn, e5 black knight, c4 white pawn, f4 white pawn, b3 white pawn, h3 black bishop, a2 white pawn, b2 white queen, d2 white knight, e2 white bishop, h2 white pawn, a1 white rook, d1 white knight, f1 white rook, g1 white king

Position after 20...Bh3, before 21.Ne3!

Position: a8 black rook, d8 black queen, f8 black rook, g8 black king, h7 black pawn, a6 black pawn, d6 black pawn, a5 black knight, b5 black pawn, c5 black pawn, d5 white pawn, c4 white pawn, f4 black knight, g4 white bishop, b3 white pawn, e3 white knight, a2 white pawn, b2 white queen, d2 white knight, h2 white pawn, f1 white rook, g1 white king

Position before 24.Rxf4!

In the tenth game from the 1966 World Chess Championship between defending champion Tigran Petrosian and challenger Boris Spassky contained two exchange sacrifices by White. Black had just moved

20... Bh3?! (first diagram)

White responded with an exchange sacrifice:

21. Ne3!

White had no choice: 21.Rf2? Rxf4 22.Rxf4 Qg5+, etc. The game continued:

21... Bxf1? 22. Rxf1 Ng6 23. Bg4! Nxf4?! (second diagram)

And now a second exchange sacrifice:

24. Rxf4! Rxf4

Black is helpless, despite being two exchanges ahead. White won back an exchange on move 29. On move 30 White forced the win of the other rook and the exchange of queens. Black resigned because the position was a winning endgame for White (two knights and five pawns versus one knight and four pawns). Petrosian won the match by one game to retain his title.

=== Kasparov vs. Shirov ===
Kasparov vs. Shirov

Position: a8 black rook, d8 black queen, e8 black king, h8 black rook, b7 black bishop, f7 black pawn, g7 black pawn, h7 black pawn, a6 black pawn, d6 black pawn, f6 black bishop, c5 black knight, d5 white knight, e5 black pawn, b4 white rook, e4 white pawn, c3 white pawn, b2 white pawn, c2 white knight, f2 white pawn, g2 white pawn, h2 white pawn, d1 white queen, e1 white king, f1 white bishop, h1 white rook

Position before 17.Rxb7!!

In a 1994 game between World Champion Garry Kasparov and Alexei Shirov, White sacrificed a pure exchange (a rook for a bishop) with the move 17. Rxb7!!. As compensation for the sacrifice, Black became weak on the white squares, which were soon dominated by White's bishop. The exchange sacrifice also deprived Black of the bishop pair and his remaining bishop was a bad bishop. During the game, many spectating grandmasters were sceptical whether White's compensation was enough. Black returned the exchange on move 28, making the material equal, but White had a strong initiative. Black missed a better 28th move after which White could have forced a draw, but would have had no clear advantage. White won the game on move 38.

== Minor exchange ==
The minor exchange is the trade of the opponent's bishop for the player's knight (or, more recently, the stronger minor piece for the weaker). Bobby Fischer used the term, but it is rarely used.

In most chess positions, a bishop is worth slightly more than a knight because of its longer range of movement. As a chess game progresses, pawns tend to get traded, removing support points from the knight and opening up lines for the bishop. This generally leads to the bishop's advantage increasing over time. In general, bishops have relatively higher value in an open game and knights have relatively higher value in a closed game.

Traditional chess theory espoused by masters such as Wilhelm Steinitz and Siegbert Tarrasch puts more value on the bishop than the knight. In contrast, the hypermodern school favored the knight over the bishop. Modern theory is that it depends on the position, but that there are more positions where the bishop is better than where the knight is better.

Occasions when a knight can be worth more than a bishop are frequent, so this exchange is not necessarily made at every opportunity to do so.

Black to move

Position: f8 black rook, g8 black king, a7 black pawn, b7 black pawn, e7 black knight, f7 black pawn, g7 black pawn, h6 black pawn, b3 white bishop, d3 white pawn, e3 white bishop, g3 white pawn, a2 white pawn, b2 white pawn, e2 white pawn, f2 white pawn, h2 white pawn, g1 white king

The bishop pair and two pawns in return is often more than sufficient compensation for the loss of the exchange.

Many of the Classicists of the late nineteenth and early twentieth century claimed that two bishops versus rook and knight were equivalent. Today, the view is that a pair of bishops should not be underestimated, but the rook and knight are superior. A pair of active bishops is frequently adequate compensation for a pawn - or even the exchange in a middlegame position. Adding the better cooperation of the rook with the bishops, many Soviet theoreticians believed that, in active positions, rook and two bishops outperform two rooks and a knight. The modern consensus is that the side with the two bishops need at least a pawn when facing rook and knight; even then the side with the two bishops is underdog. William Steinitz reckoned that often two bishops and two pawns are superior against rook and knight.

A rook and bishop usually work better together than a rook and knight in the endgame. José Raúl Capablanca stated that a queen and knight work better together than a queen and bishop in the endgame. More recently, John Watson has stated that from his study of this endgame that an unusually large proportion of queen and knight versus queen and bishop endings are drawn, and that most decisive games are characterized by the winning side having one or more obvious advantages (for example, having a knight against a bad bishop in a closed position, or having a bishop in a position with pawns on both sides of the board, particularly if the knight has no natural outpost). Watson states that positions in this endgame in general "are very volatile, and often the winning side is simply the one who starts out being able to win material or launch an attack on the opposing king". Glenn Flear agrees with that assessment for endgames. He could not find an endgame by Capablanca that supported his statement. The statistics for queen and bishop versus queen and knight endgames are about even. Most decisive games were won because of a significant advantage from the middlegame and only a limited number of positions show an inherent superiority for one over the other.

== See also ==
- Chess piece relative value
- Chess strategy
- Chess tactics
- Chess theory
- Exchange (chess)
