= Overloading (chess) =

Chess tactic

Overloading (also overworking) is a chess tactic in which a defensive piece is given an additional defensive assignment which it cannot complete without abandoning its original defensive assignment.

== Examples ==
Krasenkow vs. Karpov, 2003

Position: e8 white bishop, g8 black king, a7 black pawn, f7 black pawn, g7 black pawn, b6 black pawn, f6 black queen, g6 black knight, h6 black pawn, c5 black bishop, d5 white rook, a4 white queen, f3 white pawn, g3 white pawn, e2 black rook, h2 white pawn, f1 white rook, h1 white king

Black to play

Krasenkow–Karpov, in the first round of the 2003 Corus chess tournament, reached the diagrammed position with Black to play. As the white rook on f1 is preventing the black queen from giving checkmate by capturing the pawn on f3, Black won immediately with

29... Re1!

further pinning the white rook against the king and overloading the rook. White now cannot prevent the black queen from taking the f-pawn: if White tries to protect the rook with 30.Rxe1 or 30.Qc4, then 30...Qxf3#. If White sacrifices the rook by playing 30.Kg2, then 30...Rxf1 31.Kxf1 Qxf3+ and loses the other rook with 32...Qxd5.

Nisipeanu vs. Giri, 2010

Position: e8 black rook, f8 black bishop, c7 black pawn, d7 black bishop, e7 black rook, g7 black king, b6 black pawn, f6 black queen, g6 black pawn, h6 black pawn, a5 black pawn, c5 black pawn, d5 white pawn, e5 black knight, c4 white pawn, e4 white bishop, f4 black pawn, b3 white pawn, h3 white pawn, a2 white pawn, c2 white knight, d2 white queen, e2 white rook, f2 white pawn, g2 white pawn, e1 white rook, g1 white king

Black to play

In Liviu-Dieter Nisipeanu–Anish Giri (see diagram), Giri (Black) played

30... Bxh3!

overloading the g2-pawn, as 31.gxh3 is met with 31...f3 32.Re3 Qg5+. After 31.Qc3? Bg4, Nisipeanu resigned.

An overload was also used in Rotlewi versus Rubinstein.
