= Pin (chess) =

Tactic in the game of chess

In chess, a pin is a tactic in which a defending piece cannot move out of an attacking piece's line of attack without exposing a more valuable defending piece. Moving the attacking piece to effect the pin is called pinning; the defending piece restricted by the pin is described as pinned. Only a piece that can move any number of squares along a horizontal, vertical, or diagonal line (i.e. a bishop, rook, or queen) can pin. Any piece can be pinned except the king. The pin is one of the most powerful chess tactics.

The inverse of a pin is a skewer, in which a more valuable piece under direct attack may move to expose a less valuable piece to an attack.

== Types ==
Position: b8 black rook, c8 black king, e6 black knight, f5 white bishop, b4 white knight, b1 white queen, d1 white king

There is an absolute pin on the black knight: moving it is not legal since the black king would be exposed to check from the bishop.
There is a relative pin on the white knight: moving it is legal but would allow the black rook to capture the queen.

=== Absolute pin ===
An absolute pin is one where the piece shielded by the pinned piece is the king. In this case it is illegal to move the pinned piece out of the line of attack, as that would place one's king in check (see diagram). A piece pinned in this way can still give check or defend another piece from capture by the opposing king.

=== Relative pin ===
A relative pin is one where the piece shielded by the pinned piece is a piece other than the king, but typically is more valuable than the pinned piece. Moving such a pinned piece is legal but may not be prudent, as the shielded piece would then be vulnerable to capture if the pinned piece moving does not put the opponent’s king in check.

=== Partial pin ===
Examples of partial pins

Position: e8 black king, b7 black pawn, c4 black bishop, e4 black queen, d3 white pawn, b2 white bishop, e1 white rook, f1 white king

The black queen is pinned by the white rook, but can still move along the e-file.
The white pawn is pinned by the black bishop such that it cannot advance or capture the queen, but it can still capture the bishop.

Independently of whether it is absolute or relative, a pin might be a partial pin, in which the pinned piece can still move along the line of the pin, and it might be able to capture the piece that is pinning it, but it cannot leave that line. For example, a rook or queen can be partially pinned along a file or rank, or a bishop or queen can be partially pinned along a diagonal. Capturing the pinning piece can still be advantageous to the pinning player, as in the example diagram (the pinning rook is defended, so capturing it with the queen would lose material).

A queen can only ever be partially pinned, as she can move in any linear direction, while a knight can only be completely pinned due to its unique movement. The pawn is a more complex case; due to its limited and conditional movement, whether a pin on a pawn is partial depends on the line and direction of the pin and on whether there are opposing pieces available for it to capture.

It is possible for two opposing pieces to be partially pinning each other.

=== Situational pin ===
Example of a situational pin

Position: b8 black rook, g8 black king, c7 black pawn, f7 black pawn, h7 black pawn, d6 black pawn, g6 black pawn, d5 black bishop, b4 white knight, c3 white pawn, e3 white pawn, f2 white pawn, g2 white pawn, h2 white pawn, e1 white king, h1 white rook

White to move. White's knight should not capture the black bishop; otherwise, the rook on h1 is lost.

Sometimes a piece may be considered to be in a situational pin. Like a relative pin, a situational pin does not legally restrict the piece from moving, but moving the pinned piece out of the line of attack can result in some detriment to the player (e.g. checkmate, immediate loss of the game, occupation of a critical square by the opponent, etc.).

Consider the diagrammed position with White to move. The black bishop on d5 is unprotected and White can capture it with 1.Nxd5; however, White should not play the capture or otherwise move the knight, due to the skewer attack 1...Rb1+ winning White's rook (the king is forced to move, then 2...Rxh1). It can be said that the white knight is "pinned to the b1-square" rather than pinned to a piece.

=== Cross-pin ===
A cross-pin consists of two or more pins, of any type, on the same piece. As there is only one king per side, only one of the pins can be absolute, but there are otherwise no restrictions on the types of pins involved.

== Pin combinations ==
Pinning can also be used in combination with other tactics. For example, a piece can be pinned to prevent it from moving to attack, or a defending piece can be pinned as part of tactic undermining an opponent's defense. Another tactic which takes advantage of a pin can be called working the pin. In this tactic, other pieces from the pinning piece's side attack the opposing pinned piece. Since the pinned piece cannot move out of the line of attack, the player whose piece is pinned may move other pieces to defend the pinned piece, but the pinning player may yet attack with even more pieces, etc. Using a battery of doubled rooks with a queen behind them to this end is known as Alekhine's gun.

A pinned piece can usually no longer be counted on as a defender of another friendly piece or as an attacker of an opposing piece (unless the subject piece is in the pinning line). A pinned piece can still give check to the opposing king, however, and therefore can still defend friendly pieces against captures made by the enemy king.

== Unpinning ==
Breaking a pin is called unpinning. This can be done in a number of ways: the piece creating the pin can be captured or chased away; another unit can be moved to block the line of the pin; the unit to which a piece is pinned can be moved; or, a relatively pinned piece can move despite the pin, such as in the Légal Trap and the Elephant Trap.

== Pins commonly seen in gameplay ==
Position: a8 black rook, b8 black knight, d8 black queen, e8 black king, f8 black bishop, g8 black knight, h8 black rook, a7 black pawn, b7 black pawn, c7 black pawn, e7 black pawn, f7 black pawn, h7 black pawn, d6 black pawn, g6 black pawn, d4 white pawn, e4 white pawn, g4 black bishop, f3 white knight, a2 white pawn, b2 white pawn, c2 white pawn, f2 white pawn, g2 white pawn, h2 white pawn, a1 white rook, b1 white knight, c1 white bishop, d1 white queen, e1 white king, f1 white bishop, h1 white rook

The f3-knight is pinned.

A pinning move that often occurs in openings is Bb5 which, if Black has moved ...Nc6 and ...d6 or ...d5, pins the knight on c6, since moving the knight would expose the king on e8 to check. The same may occur on the other flank, with a bishop on g5; or by Black on White, with a bishop on b4 or g4.

== Examples from games ==
Position: g8 black king, a7 black pawn, b7 black pawn, d7 black knight, g7 black pawn, h7 black pawn, d6 black bishop, e6 white knight, d5 white pawn, f5 black pawn, b4 white pawn, c4 white pawn, e3 black rook, f3 white bishop, g3 black queen, h3 black rook, a2 white pawn, d2 white queen, g2 white pawn, a1 white rook, f1 white rook, g1 white king

White to move, resigned. His pawn on g2, pinned by Black's queen, cannot take the deadly black rook on h3.

The diagram shows Vladimir Lenin–Maxim Gorky, Capri 1908, with White to move. Black is threatening the following rook sacrifice and forced mate: 27...Rh1+ 28.Kxh1 Qh2#. White cannot play 27.gxh3, because the queen on g3 is pinning the pawn to the g-file. The only move that postpones the mate is 27.Nf4, which temporarily blocks Black's bishop from protecting his queen, but to no avail as Black can simply play 27...Bxf4 renewing the mate threat. Or, Black can respond by mating a different way: 27.Nf4 Qh2+ 28.Kf2 Rhxf3#. In this case, White cannot capture 29.gxf3 because the queen now on h2 pins the pawn to the 2nd rank. With mate being inevitable, White resigned after move 26.

== See also ==
- Chess tactics

== Sources ==
- Fine, Reuben (1952). The Middle Game in Chess. David McKay. pp. 14–15.
- Golombek, Harry (1977). Golombek's Encyclopedia of Chess. Crown Publishing. ISBN 0-517-53146-1.
- Hooper, David; Whyld, Kenneth (1996) [First pub. 1992]. The Oxford Companion to Chess (2nd ed.). Oxford University Press. ISBN 0-19-280049-3.
