= Discovered attack =

Chess direct attack revealed when one piece moves out of the way of another

Position: e8 black queen, e5 black king, e4 white bishop, e3 white rook, g3 black rook, b2 white king, g2 white pawn

From this position, 1.Bf3+ is a winning discovered check that skewers the black king and queen.

In chess, a discovered attack is a direct attack revealed when one piece moves out of the way of another. Discovered attacks can be extremely powerful, as the piece moved can make a threat independently of the piece it reveals. Like many chess tactics, they often succeed because the opponent would be unable to meet two threats at once unless one of the attacked pieces can simultaneously move away from its own attack and either capture the other attacking piece or else pose a threat serious enough to buy a tempo. While typically the consequence of a discovered attack is the gain of material, it does not have to do this to be effective; the tactic itself can be used merely to gain a tempo. If the discovered attack is a check, it is called a discovered check.

== Types ==
Position: a8 black rook, c8 black queen, e8 black rook, g8 black king, b7 black bishop, g7 black bishop, h7 black pawn, e6 white knight, g6 black pawn, h6 black knight, a5 black pawn, c5 black pawn, b4 black pawn, e4 black pawn, f4 white pawn, b3 white queen, e3 white pawn, g3 white pawn, h3 white bishop, a2 white pawn, b2 white pawn, b1 white king, c1 white rook

The move 1.Nc7+, besides forking both rooks with the knight, also reveals an attack on Black's queen and a check.

Position: h6 black king, g5 black pawn, h5 white pawn, f4 white bishop, h4 white rook, h1 white king

Position after 1...g7–g5. An en passant capture can reveal two checks at once.

When the moving piece gives check to the opponent's king, the maneuver is often described as a discovered attack with check. When the discovered attack is itself a check, it is called a discovered check. If both pieces give check, a double check results.

Discovered attacks—especially checks—can win material when the moving piece captures or attacks an opposing piece nominally protected by another opposing piece. If the opponent deals with the discovered attack (obligatory if it is a check), the attacking player will have time to return the moving piece out of harm's way. This scenario is often referred to as a discovered attack (or check) with capture. A discovered check can also win material if the moving piece ends up attacking another undefended piece. In this case, it would be impossible for the opponent first to capture the moving piece unless the king can capture.

When the moving piece moves to a square from which it threatens to inflict checkmate on the next move, the tactic is called a discovered attack with mate threat. A discovered checkmate itself is also possible.

Less often, a move may discover multiple attacks, as in the first diagram where the knight's departure opens two crisscrossing diagonals. And in exceptional circumstances, it is even possible for two checks to be revealed simultaneously. The only way for this to happen in orthodox chess is by way of an en passant capture. In the position shown in the second diagram, Black has just played 1...g7–g5. White replies 2.hxg6e.p.+. The result is a double check: One check is given by the rook, discovered by the capturing pawn's move; the other by the bishop, created by the captured pawn's removal. (The bishop’s check is not a discovered check, as the black pawn is captured and not moved.) Such a check is extremely rare in practical play, but it is sometimes found in problems.

== Example ==
Position: a8 black rook, c8 black bishop, e8 black king, f8 black bishop, g8 black knight, h8 black rook, a7 black pawn, b7 black pawn, f7 black pawn, g7 black pawn, h7 black pawn, e6 black pawn, b5 black cross, d5 black pawn, e5 white pawn, d4 black queen, d3 white bishop, a2 white pawn, b2 white pawn, f2 white pawn, g2 white pawn, h2 white pawn, a1 white rook, b1 white knight, c1 white bishop, d1 white queen, e1 white king, h1 white rook

Position after 8...Qxd4. White wins Black's queen with 9.Bb5+ (a discovered attack with check).

The diagram illustrates a trap in the Advance Variation of the French Defence, based on a discovered attack. If, after 1.e4 e6 2.d4 d5 3.e5 c5 4.c3 Nc6 5.Nf3 Qb6 6.Bd3 cxd4 7.cxd4, Black mistakenly attempts to win White's d-pawn with 7...Nxd4?? 8.Nxd4 Qxd4 (diagram), White can play 9.Bb5+, a discovered attack (White's bishop gets out of the way of White's queen) against Black's queen with check. Black must get out of check, then White can follow up with 10.Qxd4.
