= Glossary of chess =

The glossary of chess explains commonly used terms in chess, in alphabetical order. Some of these terms have their own pages, like fork and pin. The glossary uses algebraic notation to describe chess moves.

For a list of:

- unorthodox chess pieces, see Fairy chess piece;
- terms specific to chess problems, see Glossary of chess problems;
- terms specific to computer chess, see Glossary of computer chess terms;
- named opening lines, see List of chess openings;
- chess-related games, see List of chess variants;
- terms related to board games in general, see Glossary of board games.

== A ==
absolute pin
A pin against the king is called absolute since the pinned piece cannot legally move out of the line of attack (as moving it would expose the king to check).
cf. relative pin.
active
Describes a piece that threatens a number of squares, or that has a number of squares available for its next move. It may also describe an aggressive style of play.
Antonym: passive.

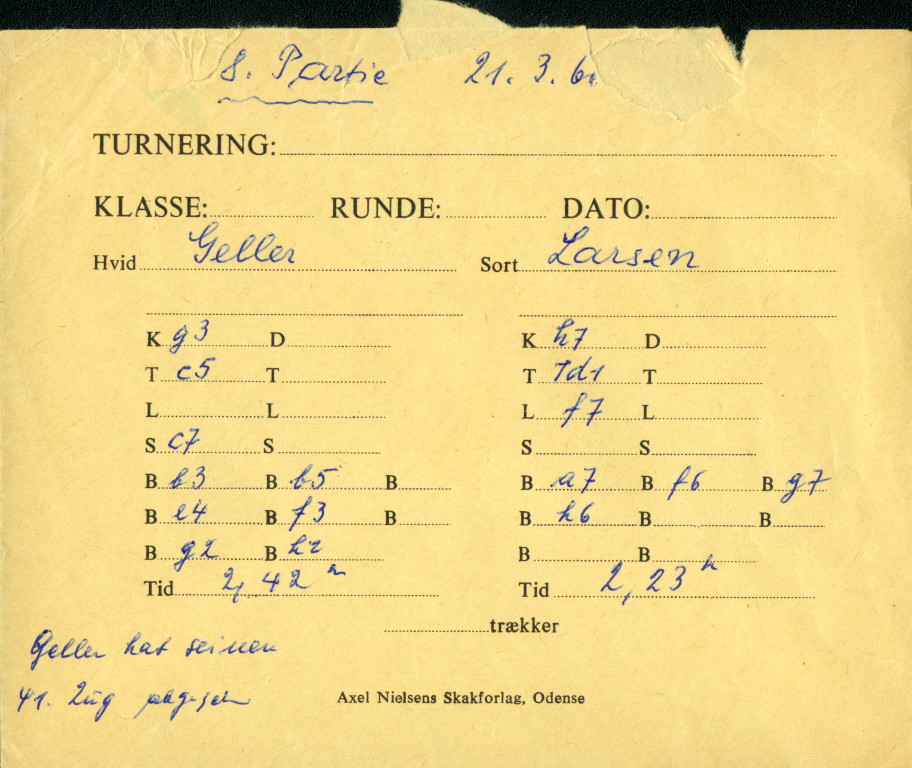
Envelope used for the adjournment of a match game Geller vs. Larsen, Copenhagen 1966

adjournment
Suspension of a chess game with the intention to finish it later. It was once very common in high-level competition, often occurring soon after the first time control, but has been mostly abandoned due to the advent of computer analysis.
See also sealed move.
adjudication
A way to decide the result of an unfinished game. A tournament director, or an impartial and strong player, will evaluate the final position and assign a win, draw, or loss assuming best play by both players.
adjust
See touch-move rule. To adjust the position of a piece on its square without being required to move it. A player may do this only on their turn, and must first say "I adjust", or the French equivalent "J'adoube".
advanced pawn
A pawn that is on the opponent's half of the board (the fifth rank or higher for White; the fourth rank or lower for Black). An advanced pawn may be weak if it is overextended, lacking support and difficult to defend, or strong if it cramps the enemy by limiting mobility. An advanced passed pawn that threatens to promote can be especially strong.
advantage
A better position with the chance of winning the game. Evaluation factors can include space, time, material, and threats.

Position: b8 black rook, f8 black king, a7 black pawn, c7 black rook, d7 black queen, e7 black knight, g7 black pawn, a6 white pawn, b6 black pawn, c6 black knight, e6 black pawn, h6 black pawn, b5 white bishop, d5 black pawn, e5 white pawn, f5 black pawn, b4 white pawn, d4 white pawn, f4 white pawn, c3 white rook, f3 white knight, c2 white rook, g2 white pawn, h2 white pawn, c1 white queen, g1 white king

Alekhine's gun
Alekhine vs. Nimzowitsch, 1930

Alekhine's gun
A special form of battery in which a queen backs up two rooks on the same file.

An example of algebraic notation

algebraic notation ("AN")
The standard way to record the moves of a chess game, using alphanumeric coordinates for the squares. Also called standard notation.
amateur
Any player whose main occupation is not chess. The distinction between professional and amateur is not very important in chess as amateurs may win prizes, accept appearance fees, and earn any title, including World Champion. In the 19th century, "Amateur" was sometimes used in published game scores to conceal the name of the losing player in a Master vs. Amateur contest. It was thought to be impolite to use a player's name without permission, and the professional did not want to risk losing a customer.
See also NN.
AN
Abbr. sometimes used for algebraic notation.
analysis
The study of a game or a position, in order to evaluate the quality of the moves and various other aspects of the game or position. At the end of a game, the players will often do an analysis of the game.
See also post mortem.
annotation
Written commentary on a game or a position using words, chess symbols, or notation.
announced mate
A practice, common in the 19th century, whereby a player would announce a sequence of moves, believed by them to constitute best play by both sides, that led to a forced checkmate for the announcing player in a specified number of moves (for example, "mate in five").
antipositional
A move or a plan that is not in accordance with the principles of positional play. Antipositional is used to describe moves that are part of an incorrect plan rather than a mistake made when trying to follow a correct plan. Antipositional moves are often pawn moves; since pawns cannot move backwards to return to squares they have left, their advance can create irreparable weaknesses.
Anti-Sicilian
An opening variation that White uses against the Sicilian Defense (1.e4 c5) other than the most common plan of 2.Nf3 followed by 3.d4 cxd4 4.Nxd4 (the Open Sicilian). Some Anti-Sicilians include the Alapin Variation (2.c3), Moscow Variation (2.Nf3 d6 3.Bb5+), Rossolimo Variation (2.Nf3 Nc6 3.Bb5), Grand Prix Attack (2.Nc3 Nc6 3.f4 g6 4.Nf3 Bg7 and now 5.Bc4 or 5.Bb5), Closed Sicilian (2.Nc3 followed by g3 and Bg2), Smith–Morra Gambit (2.d4 cxd4 3.c3), and Wing Gambit (2.b4).

Position: h8 black king, h7 white rook, f6 white knight

Arabian mate

Arabian mate
A checkmate that occurs when the knight and rook trap the opposing king in a corner.
arbiter
An official responsible for overseeing chess tournaments and ensuring that the rules of chess are obeyed.
arena
A type of tournament without a fixed amount of rounds.
Armageddon game
A game that is guaranteed to produce a decisive result, because if there is a draw it is ruled a victory for Black. In compensation for this White is given more time on the clock. Often White is given five minutes, and Black four. This format is typically used in playoff tiebreakers when shorter blitz games have not resolved the tie.
artificial castling
Refers to a maneuver of several separate moves by the king and by a rook where they end up as if they had castled. Also known as castling by hand.
attack
An aggressive action on a part of the chessboard, or to threaten the capture of a piece or pawn.
Antonym: defense.
See also counterattack, discovered attack, double attack, mating attack, and minority attack.

Position: g8 black rook, a7 white queen, b7 black queen, c7 black king, c2 white king, d2 white rook

White wins with 1.Rd7+! The black king is attracted away from the defense of the black queen with a skewer.

attraction
A type of decoy involving a sacrifice of a minor or major piece on a square next to the enemy king, forcing the king to abandon the defense of another square. For example (see diagram), the black queen has interposed to block a check from the white queen, and White can check the king from the opposite direction to win the queen.
automaton
An automaton is a self-operating machine. In chess, it refers to chess-playing machines that were in fact hoaxes and under the control of hidden human players. Automatons stirred up great interest in the 18th and 19th centuries and inspired early thoughts of the possibility of artificial intelligence. By far, the most famous chess-playing "automaton" was The Turk, whose secret of human control was kept for a long time. The first true automaton El Ajedrecista was created by Leonardo Torres y Quevedo.

== B ==
B
Symbol used for the bishop when recording chess moves in English.
back rank
A player's first rank (the rank on which the pieces stand in the starting position). White's back rank is Black's eighth rank; Black's back rank is White's eighth rank. Also called home rank and first rank.
back-rank mate
A checkmate delivered by a rook or queen along a back rank from which the mated king is unable to move because it is blocked by friendly pieces (usually pawns) or squares under attack on the player's second rank. Also called back-row mate.
back-rank weakness
A situation in which a player is under threat of a back-rank mate and, having no time/option to create an escape for the king, must constantly watch and defend against that threat, for example by keeping a rook on the back rank.
backward pawn
A pawn that is behind a pawn of the same color on an adjacent file and that cannot be advanced with the support of another pawn.

Position: f7 black pawn, g7 black pawn, d6 black bishop, e6 black pawn, h6 black pawn, b5 black pawn, d5 black pawn, b4 white pawn, d4 white pawn, c3 white bishop, e3 white pawn, h3 white pawn, f2 white pawn, g2 white pawn

White has a bad bishop, Black has a good bishop (Evans 1967:66).

bad bishop
A bishop that is hemmed in by the player's own pawns.
cf. good bishop.
bare king
A position in which a king is the only man of its color on the board.
Basque chess
Or Basque system. A chess competition in which the players simultaneously play each other two games on two boards, each playing White on one and Black on the other. There is a clock at both boards. It removes the bonus in mini-matches of playing White first. Basque chess was first played in the 2012 Donostia Chess Festival in the Basque Country, Spain.

Position: a8 black rook, e8 black rook, a7 black pawn, b7 black king, g7 black pawn, h7 black pawn, b6 black pawn, d5 black pawn, e5 white rook, f5 black pawn, d4 white pawn, f4 white pawn, g3 white pawn, h2 white pawn, e1 white rook, g1 white king

A pair of white rooks, aligned forming a battery, ready to take action

battery
Pieces gathered along a line of action in somewhat varying setups. In games, it usually means to line up rooks or the queen on a file, or to place a bishop and a queen on a diagonal. In chess problems, a battery is an arrangement of two pieces in line with the enemy king on a rank, file, or diagonal so that if the middle piece moves, a discovered check (or a threat other than a check) is delivered.
See also Alekhine's gun.
BCE
Abbr. for Basic Chess Endings, a book on chess endgames written by Reuben Fine.
BCF
British Chess Federation, the former name of the English Chess Federation.
See also ECF.
BCM
Abbr. for British Chess Magazine.
BCO
Abbr. for Batsford Chess Openings, the 1982 openings reference book by Raymond Keene and Garry Kasparov. The second edition (1989) is often called BCO-2.
cf. ECO and MCO.
best play
The theoretical absolute and ideal best moves from any given position.

Position: g8 black rook, h8 black king, b7 black pawn, c7 black pawn, g7 black pawn, b6 black rook, f6 black pawn, h6 black pawn, a5 black pawn, e5 black knight, f5 white pawn, h5 white pawn, a4 white pawn, c4 white pawn, d4 black pawn, e4 white pawn, b3 white pawn, d3 white pawn, c2 white bishop, e2 white king, g2 white rook, g1 white rook

Example of a big pawn: the white bishop is doing the work of a pawn and has no bigger prospects.
Charousek vs. Maroczy, 1895

big pawn
A bad bishop stuck behind its own pawns and defending them—effectively doing the work of a pawn.
bind
A strong grip or stranglehold on a position that is difficult for the opponent to break. A bind is usually an advantage in space created by advanced pawns. The Maróczy Bind is a well-known example.
See also squeeze.
bishop
A piece that may move along diagonals without jumping.
bishop pair
The player with two bishops is said to have the bishop pair. Two bishops are able to control the diagonals of both colors. In open positions, two bishops are considered to have an advantage over two knights, or a knight and a bishop. Also called the two bishops.
bishop pawn
Or bishop's pawn. A pawn on the bishop's file, i.e. the c-file or f-file. Sometimes abbreviated "BP".
bishops on opposite colors
Or bishops of opposite colors. A situation in which one player has only a light-square bishop remaining while the other has only a dark-square bishop remaining. In endgames, this often results in a draw if there are no other pieces than pawns, even if one side has a material advantage of one, two or even three pawns, since the bishops control different squares (see Opposite-colored bishops endgame). In the middlegame, however, the presence of opposite-colored bishops imbalances the game and can lead to mating attacks, since each bishop attacks squares that cannot be covered by the other.
black
The dark-colored squares on the chessboard are often referred to as "the black squares" even though they are often some other dark color. Similarly, "the black pieces" are sometimes actually some other (usually dark) color.
See also white.
Black
The designation for the player who moves second, even though the pieces ("the black pieces") are sometimes actually some other (usually dark) color.
See also White and First-move advantage in chess.
blind chess
See Kriegspiel.
blindfold chess
A form of chess in which one or both players are not allowed to see the board.
blind pigs
A pair of rooks on the opponent's second rank are referred to as "pigs" as they tend to devour pawns and pieces, and "blind pigs" if they cannot find the mate.
blitz chess
[from German: Blitz 'lightning'] A fast form of chess with a very short time limit, usually three or five minutes per player for the entire game. With the advent of electronic chess clocks, the time remaining is often incremented by one or two seconds per move.
blitzkrieg
A blitzkrieg is sometimes used to describe a quick attack on the f7- or f2-square early in the game.

Position: a8 black rook, d7 black pawn, g7 black pawn, h7 black king, a6 black pawn, c6 black bishop, e6 black pawn, b5 black pawn, d5 black knight, e5 white pawn, f5 black pawn, g5 white bishop, a2 white pawn, b2 white pawn, f2 white pawn, g2 white pawn, h2 white pawn, a1 white rook, d1 white rook, g1 white king

Black has a solid light-square blockade. White's bishop cannot challenge Black's minor pieces.

blockade
The placement of a piece directly in front of an enemy pawn, where it obstructs the pawn's advance, and hinders the movements of the other enemy pieces. The enemy pawn provides some shelter to the piece that is blocking it, thereby protecting it from attacks by enemy pieces. A blockade is most effective against passed or isolated pawns. The ideal piece to use as a blockader is the knight. This strategy was famously formulated by Aron Nimzowitsch in 1924.
blocked position
A position where both sides are constrained from making progress, typically by interlocking pawn chain(s) dividing the available space into two camps.
See also closed game.
blunder
A critically bad move, an oversight (indicated by "??" in chess annotation).
board
1. See chessboard.
2. An assignment in team chess, e.g. first board, second board, etc.
board one
See first board.

Position: c8 black king, e8 black rook, h8 black rook, a7 black pawn, b7 black pawn, c7 black pawn, g7 black pawn, h7 black pawn, c6 black knight, d5 white bishop, f5 black bishop, f4 white pawn, a3 black bishop, c3 white pawn, e3 white bishop, f3 white queen, a2 white pawn, d2 white knight, f2 white pawn, h2 white pawn, c1 white king, d1 white rook, h1 white rook

Boden's mate
Schulder vs. Boden, London 1853

Boden's mate
Boden's mate, named for Samuel Boden, is a checkmate pattern in which the king, usually having castled queenside, is checkmated by two crisscrossing bishops. Immediately prior to delivering the mate, the winning side typically plays a queen sacrifice on c3 or c6 to set up the mating position.
book draw
An endgame position known to be a draw with perfect play. Historically this was established by reference to chess endgame literature, but in simplified positions computer analysis in an endgame tablebase can be used. Also called theoretical draw.
book move
An opening move found in standard reference books on opening theory. A game is said to be "in book" when both players are playing moves found in the opening references. A game is said to be "out of book" when the players have reached the end of the variations analyzed in the opening books, or if one of the players deviates with a novelty (or a blunder).
book win
An endgame position known to be a win with perfect play. Historically this was established by reference to chess endgame literature, but in simplified positions (currently seven pieces or fewer) computer analysis in an endgame tablebase can be used.
break
A move that gains space and therefore freedom of movement, or the opening of a blocked position by the advance or capture of a pawn.
See also pawn break.
breakthrough
Penetration of the opponent's position, or destruction of the defense, often by means of a sacrifice.
brevity
[chiefly British] See miniature.
brilliancy
A game that contains a spectacular, deep and beautiful strategic idea, combination, or original plan.
brilliancy prize
A prize awarded at some tournaments for the best brilliancy played in the tournament.
Bronstein delay
A time control method with time delay, invented by David Bronstein. When it becomes a player's turn to move, the clock waits for the delay period before starting to subtract from the player's remaining time.

An example of bughouse chess

bughouse chess
A popular chess variant played with teams of two or more.
building a bridge
Making a path for a king in the endgame by providing protective cover against checks from line pieces. A well-known example is the Lucena position.
bullet chess
Each side has one minute to make all their moves.
bust
[colloq.] A refutation of an opening, an opening line, a tactic, or a previously published analysis.
bye
A tournament round in which a player does not have a game, usually because there are an odd number of players. A bye is normally scored as a win (1 point), although in some tournaments a player is permitted to choose to take a bye (usually in the first or last round) and score it as a draw (½ point).

== C ==
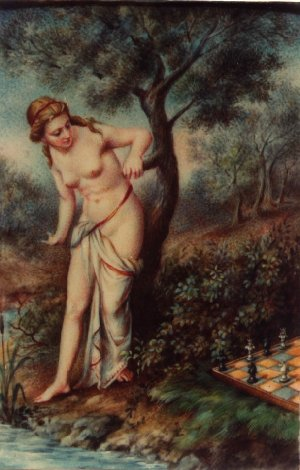
Caïssa, the patron goddess of chess (author unknown, 19th century)

Caïssa
Known as the goddess or muse of chess, whose name is taken from a nymph in a 1763 poem, Caïssa or The Game at Chess, by William Jones.
calculate
To plan mentally a series of moves and consider possible responses, without actually moving the pieces.
Candidate Master ("CM")
A chess title ranking below FIDE Master.
candidate move
A move that seems good upon initial observation of the position, and that warrants further analysis.
Candidates Match
A knockout match in the Candidates Tournament.
Candidates Tournament
A tournament organized by the FIDE, the third and last qualifying cycle of the World Chess Championship. The participants are the top players of the Interzonal tournament plus possibly other players selected on the basis of rating or performance in the previous candidates tournament. The top ranking player(s) qualify(ies) for the world championship.
can opener
[colloq.] The plan of attacking a kingside position (sometimes a fianchettoed one) by advancing the h-pawn with the intention of opening a file near the defender's king.
capped piece
A particular piece with which one player attempts to deliver checkmate. The requirement to checkmate with the capped piece constitutes a handicap. When the capped piece is a pawn, it is called a pion coiffé [from French, 'capped pawn'].
capture
A move by a pawn or piece that removes from the board the opponent's pawn or piece. The capturing piece then occupies the square of the captured piece, except in the case of a capture that is done en passant.
castling
A move in which the king and a rook are moved at the same time. It moves the king from the center to a flank where it usually is safer, and it develops the rook. It is the only time two pieces are moved in a turn. Castling can be done on either the kingside (notated 0-0) or the queenside (0-0-0). Castling cannot be done in reply to a check, nor if the king were to cross or land on a square that is under attack by the opponent, nor if either the king or the rook involved has already moved.
castling into it
A situation where one side castles and a result is that the king is in more danger at the destination than on the initial square, either immediately or because lines and diagonals can be more readily opened against it.
castling long
Castling queenside; in chess notation: 0-0-0. Also called long castling.
castling rights
The ability to castle under the laws of chess.
castling short
Castling kingside; in chess notation: 0-0. Also called short castling.
casual game
See friendly game.
category
The category of a tournament is a measure of its strength based on the average FIDE rating of the participants. The category is calculated by rounding up the number: (average rating − 2250) ÷ 25. So each category covers a 25-point rating range, starting with Category 1 which spans ratings between 2251 and 2275. A Category 18 tournament has an average rating between 2676 and 2700.
CC
Abbr. for correspondence chess or for chess club.

Position: a8 black rook, b8 black knight, c8 black bishop, d8 black queen, e8 black king, f8 black bishop, g8 black knight, h8 black rook, a7 black pawn, b7 black pawn, c7 black pawn, d7 black pawn, e7 black pawn, f7 black pawn, g7 black pawn, h7 black pawn, d5 black cross, e5 black cross, d4 black cross, e4 black cross, a2 white pawn, b2 white pawn, c2 white pawn, d2 white pawn, e2 white pawn, f2 white pawn, g2 white pawn, h2 white pawn, a1 white rook, b1 white knight, c1 white bishop, d1 white queen, e1 white king, f1 white bishop, g1 white knight, h1 white rook

The center squares are marked "×".

center
Or centre. The four squares in the middle of the board. Sometimes short for pawn center. A king "in the center" can refer to an uncastled king on a center file.
See also expanded center.
center file
Or centre file. The king's file (e-file) or queen's file (d-file).
center pawn
Or centre pawn. A pawn on the king's file (e-file) or queen's file (d-file).
centipawn
A unit of evaluation used by chess engines, e.g. an evaluation of +1.32 is worth 20 centipawns more than an evaluation of +1.12. Historically a centipawn corresponded to a material value of 0.01 of a pawn; however, the strongest modern engines no longer rate pawns as worth 1.
central control
See control of the center.
central file
See center file.
centralization
Moving a piece or pieces toward the center of the board, where they will not only control the center, but also extend their influence to other areas. Pieces are best placed near the center of the board, because they increase their power and maneuverability. Knights in particular benefit from being centralized.
Antonym: decentralization.
central pawn
See center pawn.
central square
See center.
cheapo
[slang] A primitive trap, often set in the hope of swindling a win or a draw from a lost position. Also called cheap shot.
check
A direct attack on the king by an enemy man. The attacked king is said to be in check. There are only three possible responses to a check: capturing the attacking piece, moving the king to an unattacked square, or interposing a piece between the attacker and the king. In casual games a player usually announces "check"; however, this is not a requirement in tournament games.
checkmate
Often shortened to mate. A position in which a player's king is in check and the player has no legal move (i.e. cannot move out of or escape the check). A player whose king is checkmated loses the game.
chess annotation
See annotation.
chess blindness
The failure of a player to see a good move or danger that should normally be considered obvious. The term was coined by Siegbert Tarrasch. Similar to Kotov syndrome.
chessboard
The chequered board used in chess, consisting of 64 squares (eight rows by eight columns) arranged in two alternating colors, light and dark.

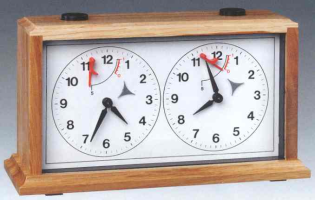
A chess clock

chess clock
A device made up of two adjacent clocks and buttons, keeping track of the total time each player takes for their moves. Immediately after moving, the player presses their button, which simultaneously stops their clock and starts their opponent's. The picture shown displays an analogue clock from which the term flag fall originates. Modern clocks are digital.
chess club
An in-person, local chess play organization.
chessmen
The movable figures placed on the board in a game of chess. Includes both pieces and pawns. Singular: chessman.
chess notation
See notation.
chess opening
See opening.
chess problem
Also called composition. A chess position created by the composer which presents the solver with a particular task; for example, "White mates in two" (i.e., White to move and checkmate Black in two moves against any possible defense).

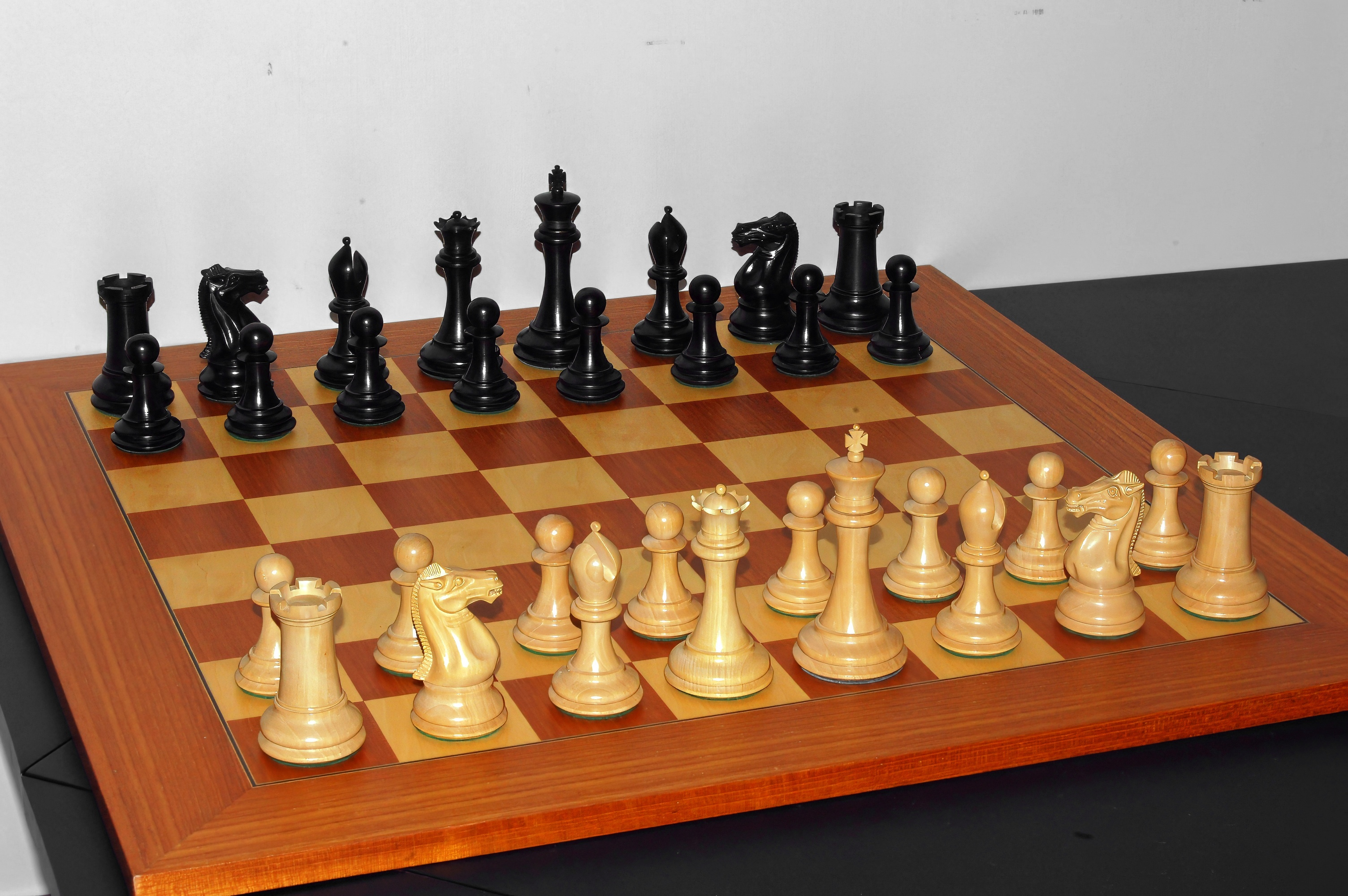
A wooden chess set and board

chess set
The thirty-two pieces required for a game, plus a chessboard.
chess variant
A chess-like game played using a board, pieces, or rules different from standard chess.
Chess960
Also known as Fischer Random Chess. A variant of chess invented and advocated by Bobby Fischer. The pieces and pawns have their normal moves, but the setup of pieces on the first rank is random, except that two rules must be followed: the king must be placed on a square between the rooks, and the bishops are placed on squares of opposite color. Black's pieces are placed opposite White's. Castling may be done; the special castling rules incorporate the normal castling in classic chess.
chop wood
[slang] Capturing or exchanging pieces.
See also wood.
classical
1. An opening system geared towards forming a full pawn center. Classical ideas were challenged by hypermodern ideas.
2. A game using a longer time control such as 40/2; the opposite of fast chess categories such as rapid, blitz, or bullet.
classical bishop sacrifice
See Greek gift sacrifice.
clearance
Removal of piece from a square, rank, file, or diagonal so that another piece may use it. It often involves sacrificing the piece that blocked the position. See Clearance sacrifice.
clock move
In a game played clock move, a move is considered completed only after the clock is pressed. For example, one could touch a piece, then move a different piece—as long as the player has not pressed their clock button. This way of playing is uncommon but can be seen in casual games or blitz games.
clock time
Time (consumed or remaining) on the chess clock, in a tournament game.
closed file
A file on which White and Black each have a pawn.
closed game
Or close game, or closed position. A closed game has few open lines (files or diagonals). It is generally characterized by interlocking pawn chains, cramped positions with few opportunities to exchange, and extensive maneuvering behind lines. Such a game may evolve and later become an open game.
See also positional play.
Closed Game
A Closed Game is a particular opening that begins with the moves 1.d4 d5. It is also known as a Double Queen's Pawn Opening or Double Queen's Pawn Game.
cf. Open Game.
See also Semi-Closed Game.
closed tournament
A tournament in which only invited or qualifying players may participate. Also called invitational tournament.
cf. open tournament.
CM
Abbr. for Candidate Master.

Position: a8 black rook, c8 black bishop, d8 black queen, e8 black king, f8 black bishop, g8 black knight, h8 black rook, a7 black pawn, b7 black pawn, c7 black pawn, d7 black pawn, f7 black pawn, g7 black pawn, h7 black pawn, e5 black pawn, c4 white bishop, d4 black knight, e4 white pawn, f3 white knight, a2 white pawn, b2 white pawn, c2 white pawn, d2 white pawn, f2 white pawn, g2 white pawn, h2 white pawn, a1 white rook, b1 white knight, c1 white bishop, d1 white queen, e1 white king, h1 white rook

The Blackburne Shilling Gambit (1.e4 e5 2.Nf3 Nc6 3.Bc4 Nd4?!), an example of coffeehouse play

coffeehouse
Adjective used to describe a move, player, or style of play characterized by risky, positionally dubious play that sets traps for the opponent. The name comes from the notion that one would expect to see such play in skittles games played in a coffeehouse or similar setting, particularly in games played for stakes or blitz chess. The Blackburne Shilling Gambit is a typical example of coffeehouse play.

Position: c8 black bishop, e8 black king, h8 black rook, a7 black pawn, b7 black pawn, e7 white pawn, c6 black pawn, g6 white rook, h6 white queen, f4 white pawn, h3 white pawn, a2 white pawn, b2 black queen, d2 black rook, g2 white pawn, h2 white king, e1 white rook

White played a collinear move 41.Qh5 and won.
Maróczy vs. Romi, San Remo 1930

collinear move
A move in which two opposing pieces face each other, and one slides along the line of attack without capturing the enemy piece.
color
Or colour. The white or black pieces, and the white or black squares. The actual pieces and squares may be other colors, usually light and dark, but they are referred to as white and black. See White and Black in chess.
colorbound
Or colourbound. The property of a piece to access only squares of one color. In standard chess, each bishop is colorbound to either the white or black squares.
colors reversed
Or colours reversed. With colors reversed refers to opening moves by White normally played by Black, or vice versa. An example is the King's Indian Attack, where White's opening setup mirrors Black's setup in the King's Indian Defense. In such openings, White necessarily has an extra tempo compared to Black. Also called a reverse opening.
combination
A sequence of moves, including forced moves, and often involving a sacrifice, to gain an advantage.
compensation
That which is gained in return for a loss – often a positional improvement in return for loss of material. If material is sacrificed there may be a gain in development, or if a minor piece is exchanged for two or three pawns, the pawns would be the compensation.
computer move
A move that seems likely to have been played by a computer rather than a human, either because the move seems counterintuitive, or to not make immediate sense, or to eventually make sense but not until deep into the game. Computer moves seem to be what they are: moves based on millions of brute-force calculations, and not on intuition, aesthetics, or emotion. A computer move would overlook a dramatic capture that might cause an opponent to immediately resign, in favor of an obscure move that may turn out to be only slightly better. At one time the term was used disparagingly, but its meaning has evolved as computers have improved. It is occasionally used to suggest that a player has been assisted by computer.
connected passed pawns
Passed pawns on adjacent files. These are considered to be unusually powerful (often worth a minor piece or rook if on the sixth rank or above and not properly blockaded) because they can advance together.
See also connected pawns.
connected pawns
Refers to two or more pawns of the same color on adjacent files.
cf. isolated pawns.
connected rooks
Two rooks of the same color on the same rank or file with no pawns or pieces between them. Connected rooks are usually desirable. Players often connect rooks on their own first rank or along an open file.
See also doubled rooks.
consolidation
The improvement of a player's position by the reposition of one or more pieces to better square(s), typically after a player's attack or combination has left their pieces in poor positions or uncoordinated.
consultation game
A game in which two or more players consult with each other to jointly decide the moves for one side. Consultation games may also involve teams of two or more players playing on both sides.
continuation
See variation.
control
When a player's pawn, piece or pieces guard a square, or squares, or a file, or a rank in such a way that the territory can be advantageously used; and the opponent is prevented from using the territory. Also, the player who has the initiative has control.
control of the center
Having one or more pieces that attack any of the four center squares; an important strategy, and one of the main aims of openings.
convert
To win a game after obtaining an advantage.
See also consolidation.
cook
In chess problems, an unintended alternative solution, or a refutation.
See also Glossary of chess problems § cook.
coordination
The quality of multiple pieces working together, mutually supporting and complementing one another.
corr.
Abbr. for correspondence game.
correspondence chess
Chess played at a long time control by long-distance correspondence. Traditionally correspondence chess was played through the post; today it is usually played over a correspondence chess server or by email. Typically, one move is transmitted in every correspondence.
corresponding squares
Corresponding squares are pairs of squares such that when a king moves to one square, it forces the opponent's king to occupy the other square in order to hold the position. Corresponding squares usually occur in pawn endgames. The theory of corresponding squares has developed to include complex calculations based on math-like formulas. Also called related squares.
cf. opposition.
counterattack
An attack that responds to an attack by the opponent in a way other than by direct defense.

Position: a8 black rook, b8 black knight, c8 black bishop, d8 black queen, e8 black king, f8 black bishop, g8 black knight, h8 black rook, a7 black pawn, b7 black pawn, c7 black pawn, f7 black pawn, g7 black pawn, h7 black pawn, d5 black pawn, e5 black pawn, e4 white pawn, f4 white pawn, a2 white pawn, b2 white pawn, c2 white pawn, d2 white pawn, g2 white pawn, h2 white pawn, a1 white rook, b1 white knight, c1 white bishop, d1 white queen, e1 white king, f1 white bishop, g1 white knight, h1 white rook

The Falkbeer Countergambit (1.e4 e5 2.f4 d5), a gambit response to the King's Gambit

countergambit
Also "counter-gambit", "counter gambit". An opening gambit offered by Black. Some writers define the term more narrowly as an opening gambit offered by Black in response to an opening gambit by White such as the Albin Countergambit (1.d4 d5 2.c4 e5) or the Falkbeer Countergambit (1.e4 e5 2.f4 d5).
counterplay
The defending side's own aggressive action.
country move
A disparaging term for a move considered unsophisticated, especially an unnecessary single-step advance of the rook's pawn in the opening. The term was popular in London in the late 19th century.
cover
To protect a piece or control a square.
cramped
Having limited mobility in a position.
critical position
The moment in a game or opening when the evaluation shows that things are about to change, either towards an advantage for one player, or towards equality; a wrong move can be disastrous.
critical square
See key square.
cross-check
A cross-check is a check played in reply to a check, especially when the original check is blocked by a piece that itself either delivers check or reveals a discovered check from another piece.
crosstable
An arrangement of the results of every game in a tournament in tabular form. The names of the players run down the left side of the table in numbered rows. The names may be listed in order of results, alphabetically, or in pairing order, but results order is most common. There may be one column for each successive round, or, in a round-robin tournament, there may be one column for each player, with the players in the same order in the columns as in the rows. For each player, the table cells on the player's row record the results of the player's games, using 1 for a win, 0 for a loss, and ½ for a draw. (In a double round-robin tournament each cell contains two entries, as each pair of players plays two games alternating White and Black.) For examples see Hastings 1895 chess tournament, Nottingham 1936 chess tournament, and AVRO tournament.
crush
[colloq.] A quick win, especially an overwhelming attack versus poor defensive play. A crushing move is a decisive one.

== D ==
dark-square bishop
Often shortened to dark bishop or abbreviated DSB. One of the two bishops that moves only on the dark squares. In the starting position, White's dark-square bishop is on c1; Black's is on f8.
cf. light-square bishop.
dark squares
The 32 dark-colored squares on the chessboard, such as a1 and h8. A dark square is always located at a player's left-hand corner.
cf. light squares.

Position: e7 white bishop, b5 white king, e3 black king

A dead draw by means of insufficient material. King versus king and bishop will never lead to checkmate. If for Black, a knight or a light-squared bishop were added to the position (e.g. a Nf3 or Bf3), a mate would be possible in theory for either side, but not with reasonable play, making it a dead draw in the broader sense.

dead draw
A drawn position in which neither player has any realistic chance to win. In the strict sense, dead draw may refer to a position in which it is impossible for either player to win (such as insufficient material). In a broader sense, it may refer to a simple, lifeless position that would require a major blunder before either side would have a chance to win.
dead position
A position where neither player can mate the opponent's king with any series of legal moves (e.g. knight and king against a bare king). This position is drawn.
decoy
This is a tactic used to lure an enemy man away from its defensive position.
See also deflection and attraction.
defense
1. A move or plan to meet the opponent's attack.
2. Part of the name of openings played by Black; e.g. the Scandinavian Defense, King's Indian Defense, English Defense, etc.
deflection
A decoy tactic that involves luring an enemy piece away from a good square; typically, away from a square on which it defends another piece or threat. Deflection is thus closely related to overloading.
See also attraction.

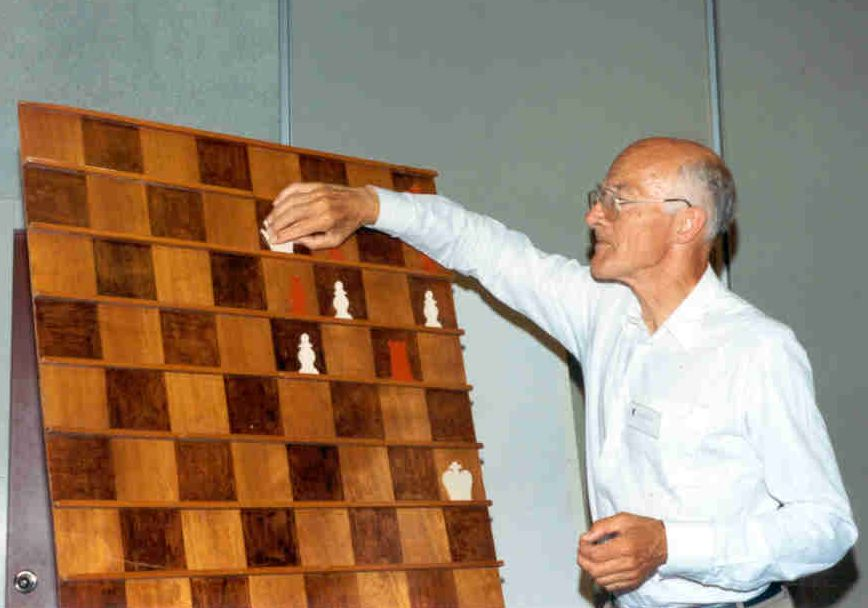
Wouter Mees at a demonstration board

demonstration board
A large standing chess board used to analyze a game or show a game in progress. Johann Löwenthal invented the demonstration board in 1857.
descriptive notation
A system of recording chess moves, used primarily in the English- and Spanish-speaking countries until the 1980s. Descriptive notation is based on natural language descriptions of chess moves rendered in abbreviated form, for example "pawn to queen's bishop's fourth" is rendered as "P-QB4". Now replaced by the standard algebraic notation.
desperado
A piece that seems determined to give itself up, typically to bring about stalemate or perpetual check. Also an en prise or trapped piece that sacrifices itself for the maximum compensation possible.
development
The movement of non-pawn pieces in the opening from their original squares to squares where they can be more active. Development of one's pieces is one of the objectives of the opening phase of the game.
diagonal
A line of squares of the same color touching corner to corner, along which a queen or bishop moves.
dirty flag
A scenario in which a player having a losing position on the board wins by virtue of the opponent exceeding the time control. It typically occurs in faster formats, such as blitz or bullet, where a player prioritizes making rapid (often sub-optimal) moves to exhaust the opponent's remaining seconds rather than seeking a tactical or positional advantage.
See also flag.
discovered attack
An attack made by a queen, rook, or bishop when another piece or pawn moves out of its way.

Position: e8 black queen, e5 black king, e4 white bishop, e2 white rook, b1 white king

Once the e4-bishop moves, it is discovered check by the rook.

discovered check
A discovered attack to the king. This occurs when a player moves a piece, resulting in another piece putting their opponent's king in check.
diversionary sacrifice
Especially in the middlegame, the sacrifice of a decoy piece.
domination
From endgame studies, control of all movement squares of an enemy piece.
double attack
Two attacks made with one move: these attacks may be made by the same piece (in which case it is a fork); or by different pieces, for example in a discovered attack when the moved piece also makes a threat.
double check
A check delivered by two pieces at the same time. A double check necessarily involves a discovered check. By its nature a double check cannot be met by interposing a defending piece in a line of attack, or by capturing an attacker; when subjected to a double check, the attacked king must move. This makes the double check especially powerful as an attacking tactic.
doubled pawns
Two pawns of the same color on the same file; generally considered a weakness due to their inability to defend each other.
doubled rooks
A powerful configuration in which a player's two rooks are placed on the same file or rank with no other men between them. They defend each other and attack along the shared file or rank, as well as two additional ranks or files. The configuration can be especially decisive in the endgame.
double fianchetto
A player's king bishop and queen bishop have both been fianchettoed.
draw
A game that ends without victory for either player. Most drawn games are draws by agreement. The other ways that a game can end in a draw are by stalemate, by a dead position, by the threefold repetition rule, by the fifty-move rule, by the fivefold repetition rule, and by the seventy-five-move rule. A position is said to be a draw (or a "drawn position" or "theoretical draw") if either player can, through correct play, eventually force the game into a position where the game must end in a draw, regardless of the moves made by the other player. A draw is usually scored as ½ point, although in some matches only wins are counted and draws are ignored.
draw by agreement
A game that is ended by both players' accepting a draw.
See also resign.
draw death
Hypothetical scenario whereby elite-level chess players, aided by modern computer analysis, become so good that they never make mistakes, leading to endless drawn games (since chess is widely believed to be drawn with best play from both sides).
drawing line
An opening variation that commonly ends in a draw.
drawing weapon
An opening line played with the intent of drawing the game.
drawish
An adjective describing a position or game that is likely to end in a draw.
draw odds
A type of chess handicap where one player (Black in an Armageddon game) has only to draw in order to win the match.
draw offer
A proposal by a player to the opponent that the game be draw by agreement.
dynamism
A style of play in which the activity of the pieces is favored over more positional considerations, even to the point of accepting permanent structural or spatial weaknesses. Dynamism stemmed from the teachings of the Hypermodern school and challenged the dogma found in more classical teachings, such as those put forward by Wilhelm Steinitz and Siegbert Tarrasch.

== E ==
eat
[slang] To remove the opponent's piece or pawn from the board by taking it with one's own piece or pawn. Synonym: capture.
ECF
The English Chess Federation (ECF) is the governing chess organisation in England and is one of the federations of FIDE. It was known as the British Chess Federation (BCF) until 2005 when it was renamed.
ECO
Abbr. for the Encyclopaedia of Chess Openings, a standard 5-volume chess opening reference. Also ECO code, a classification system for openings that assigns an alphanumeric code from A00 to E99 to each opening.
ECU
The European Chess Union (ECU) is the continental association for chess in Europe.
edge
A small but meaningful advantage in position against one's opponent. It is often said that White has an edge in the starting position, since White moves first (see First-move advantage in chess).
cf. initiative.
eighth rank
The rank on which pawns promote (rank eight for White; rank one for Black). Also called last rank.
Elo rating system
The Elo rating system, named after the Hungarian-American statistician and chess player Arpad Elo, is a method for calculating the relative skill levels of chess players based on their results in competition. FIDE adopted the system in 1970, initially publishing ratings annually. Over the years the list has been published with increasing frequency, and since 2012 it has been published monthly. The majority of national chess federations have their own rating system for use in domestic competition, usually based on the Elo system.
endgame
The third and last phase of the game, when there are few pieces left on the board. The endgame follows the middlegame.
endgame tablebase
A computerized database of endgames with a small number of pieces, providing perfect play for both players, and thus completely solving those endgames. As of 2012, tablebases have been calculated for all positions with up to seven pieces.

Position: a8 black rook, b8 black knight, c8 black bishop, d8 black queen, e8 black king, f8 black bishop, g8 black knight, h8 black rook, a7 black pawn, b7 black pawn, d7 black pawn, f7 black pawn, g7 black pawn, h7 black pawn, e6 black cross, c5 black pawn, d5 white pawn, e5 black pawn, a2 white pawn, b2 white pawn, c2 white pawn, e2 white pawn, f2 white pawn, g2 white pawn, h2 white pawn, a1 white rook, b1 white knight, c1 white bishop, d1 white queen, e1 white king, f1 white bishop, g1 white knight, h1 white rook

After 1.d4 c5 2.d5 e5, White can play 3.dxe6, capturing the e-pawn en passant on the next move. The white pawn is placed on e6; the black pawn on e5 is removed from the board.

en passant ("e.p.")
[from French, 'in the act of passing'] The rule that allows a pawn that has just advanced two squares to be captured by an enemy pawn that is on the same rank and adjacent file. The pawn can be taken as if it had advanced only one square. Capturing en passant is possible only on the next move.

Position: a8 black rook, b8 black knight, c8 black bishop, d8 black queen, e8 black king, f8 black bishop, h8 black rook, a7 black pawn, b7 black pawn, c7 black pawn, d7 black pawn, e7 black pawn, f7 black pawn, g7 black pawn, h7 black pawn, f6 black knight, e4 white pawn, f3 white knight, a2 white pawn, b2 white pawn, c2 white pawn, d2 white pawn, f2 white pawn, g2 white pawn, h2 white pawn, a1 white rook, b1 white knight, c1 white bishop, d1 white queen, e1 white king, f1 white bishop, h1 white rook

The pawn on e4 is en prise.

en prise
[from French, 'in a position to be taken', often italicized] En prise describes a piece or pawn exposed to a material-winning capture by the opponent. This is either a hanging piece, an undefended pawn, a piece attacked by a less valuable attacker, or a piece or pawn defended insufficiently. For instance, 1.e4 Nf6 2.Nf3? leaves White's e-pawn en prise.
e.p.
Abbr. for en passant.
epaulette mate
A checkmate position where the king is blocked on both sides by its own rooks.
EPD
Abbr. for Extended Position Description.
equalize
Or equalise. To reach a position where the players have equal chances of winning, referred to as equality, or a position that is equal, or a position that is balanced. In the opening, because White has the advantage of the first move, the immediate goal for Black is to achieve equality.
escape square
See flight square.
evaluation
Or simply eval. The analysis of a position. A computer or engine evaluation is a means of assigning a number value to a position, based not on intelligence, but on algorithms, which vary from engine to engine and depend on engine strength. Engine evaluations have foibles and imperfections even when functioning as designed. If an engine describes a position as +2.50, the plus sign ("+") indicates the position is favorable to White; a minus sign ("−") indicates the position is favorable to Black. The number can correspond to the approximate value of pieces, although engines use other factors besides material. The notation +2.50 indicates that White is ahead by two and one-half pawns. The notation +M4 (or sometimes #4) indicates that White can force checkmate in four moves.
cf. analysis.
exchange
To swap or trade pieces by capture. Usually the pieces are of equal value (i.e., rook for rook, knight for knight, etc.), or of bishop for knight (two pieces that are considered approximately equal in value). Although some writers define an exchange to always be of equal value, most writers do not.
exchange, the
The advantage of a rook over a minor piece (knight or bishop). The player who captures a rook for a minor piece is said to have "won the exchange", the player who has lost the rook has "lost the exchange". An exchange sacrifice is giving up a rook for a minor piece.
exchange variation
This is a type of opening in which there is an early, voluntary exchange of pawns or pieces.
exhibition
Chess games played for the public in various formats and for various purposes, often to promote the game, or a particular match or player, or as a fundraiser. An exhibition may pit two masters against each other, and normally use chess clocks. In a simultaneous exhibition, one player takes on a number of opponents at once, and it is often not timed. A blindfold exhibition is the same but more challenging, since the exhibitor plays without seeing the boards.
expanded center
The central sixteen squares of the chessboard.
exposed king
A king lacking pawns to shield it from enemy attack.
extended fianchetto
See fianchetto.
extended pawn center
See pawn center.
Extended Position Description ("EPD")
A Forsyth–Edwards Notation derivative format that contains the position on the chessboard, but not the game. It is primarily used to test chess engines.

== F ==
family fork
A knight fork that simultaneously attacks the enemy king (giving check), queen, and possibly other pieces. Also known as a family check.
FAN
Abbr. for figurine algebraic notation, which substitutes symbols for letters to represent piece names (e.g. ♘f3 instead of Nf3).
fast chess
A form of chess in which both sides are given less time to make their moves than under the normal tournament time controls.
See also rapid chess, blitz chess, and bullet chess.
FEN
Abbr. for Forsyth–Edwards Notation.
FGM
Abbr. for FICGS Grandmaster.
fianchetto
[from Italian, 'little flank'] To develop a bishop to the board's longest diagonal on the file of the adjacent knight (b2 or g2 for White; b7 or g7 for Black). The fianchetto of both bishops by a player is called a double fianchetto. Less common is to develop a bishop to the rook's file (a3 or h3 for White; a6 or h6 for Black), called extended fianchetto. The Italian word is pronounced /ˌfi.ən.ˈkɛ.toʊ/ or /ˌfi.ən.ˈtʃɛ.toʊ/ in English, while its name sounds like [fjaŋ.ˈket.to] in Italian.
FICGS
Abbr. for Free Internet Correspondence Games Server.
FICGS Grandmaster
A correspondence chess title calculated by the FICGS (Free Internet Correspondence Games Server) organization.
FIDE
Abbr. for French: Fédération Internationale des Échecs ('International Chess Federation'), the primary international chess organizing and governing body. The abbreviated name FIDE is nearly always used in place of the full name in French.
FIDE Master ("FM")
A chess title ranking below International Master.
FIDE rating
See Elo rating system.
fifty-move rule
A draw may be claimed if no capture or pawn move has occurred in the last fifty moves by either side. This is related to the seventy-five-move rule, which mandates a draw after seventy-five such moves.

Position: f8 black circle, f7 black circle, f6 black circle, f5 black circle, f4 black circle, f3 black circle, f2 black circle, f1 black circle

The f-file

file
A column of squares of the chessboard. A specific file can be named either using its position in algebraic notation, a–h, or by using its position in descriptive notation. For example, "f-file" and "king bishop file" both denote the squares f1–f8 (or KB1–KB8 in descriptive notation).
fingerfehler
[from German, 'finger mistake'] An error caused by unthinkingly touching the wrong piece or releasing a piece on the wrong square, forcing the player to move that piece in accordance with the touch-move rule.
first board
In team chess, the player who is assigned to face the strongest opponents. Also called top board and board one. Second board faces the next strongest players, followed by third board, and so on. Generally board assignments must be made before the competition begins. Players may not switch boards, although reserve players are often allowed as substitutes.
first-move advantage
The slight (by most accounts) advantage that White has by virtue of moving first.
first player
The expression "the first player" is sometimes used to refer to White.
first rank
See home rank.
Fischer delay
A time control method with time delay, invented by Bobby Fischer. When it becomes a player's turn to move, the delay is added to the player's remaining time.
Fischerandom
The name given by Bobby Fischer for the variant of chess he invented. See Chess960.
Fischer Random Chess
See Chess960.
fish
[derogatory slang] A weak or easily defeated player or players.
See also woodpusher.
fivefold repetition
A game is drawn if the same position occurs five times with the same player to move and with each player having the choice of the same set of moves each time, including the right to capture en passant and the right to castle. The threefold repetition rule operates on a similar principle but is invoked at a player's discretion instead of automatically.
five-minute chess
See blitz chess.
flag
Part of an analogue chess clock, usually red, that indicates when the minute hand passes the hour. To "flag" someone means winning the game on the basis of the opponent exceeding the time control.
flag-fall
The event when the allotted time of a player has just expired; the player has run out of time.
flank
The queenside a-, b-, and c-files; or the kingside f-, g-, and h-files. Distinguished from the center d- and e-files. Also called wing.
flank opening
An opening played by White and typified by play on one or both flanks.
flight square
A square to which a piece can move, that allows it to escape attack. Also called escape square.
See also luft.
FM
Abbr. for FIDE Master.
FOA
Abbr. for the FIDE Online Arena.

An example of Fool's mate

Fool's mate
The shortest possible chess game ending in mate: 1.f3 e5 2.g4 Qh4# (or minor variations on this).
forced mate
A sequence of two or more moves culminating in checkmate that the opponent cannot prevent.
forced move
The only legal move in a position, or the only move which does not result in an immediate loss or serious disadvantage.
cf. forcing move.
forced win
A win guaranteed by a series of forcing moves.
forcing move
A move that presents a threat and limits the opponent's responses.
cf. forced move.
forfeit
Refers to losing the game by breaking rules, by absence or by exceeding the time control (forfeit on time).
fork
A simultaneous attack by a single piece on two (or more) of the opponent's pieces (or other direct target, such as a mate threat). When the attacker is a knight the tactic is often specifically called a knight fork. Some sources state that only a knight can give a fork and that the term double attack is correct when another piece is involved, but this usage is rare.
Forsyth–Edwards Notation ("FEN")
A standard notation for describing a particular board position of a chess game. The purpose of FEN notation is to provide all the necessary information to restart a game from a particular position.
fortress
In endgame theory, a fortress is an impenetrable position which, if obtained by the side with a material disadvantage, may result in a draw due to the stronger side's inability to make progress.
frame
A square region of the board enclosing another region not part of the given frame, akin to a picture frame. Also referred to as a ring. The outer frame consists of the 28 squares along the edge of the board, the middle frame consists of the 20 squares just inside the outer frame, and the inner frame consists of the 12 squares just inside the middle frame. The notion of the frame may be expanded to include the center itself as the innermost frame. The mobility of pieces is closely related to the frame on which they stand. In general, a piece closer to the center has greater freedom of movement than a piece closer to the edge of the board.
friendly game
A game that is not played as part of a match, tournament, or exhibition. Often the game is not timed, but if a chess clock is used, rapid time controls are common. The term refers only to the circumstances in which the game is played, not the relationship between the players or the intensity of the competition. Also called casual game and informal game.
frontier line
An imaginary line dividing the board into two halves, passing between the fourth and fifth ranks. The frontier line separates White's side of the board from Black's side. Coined by Aron Nimzowitsch.

== G ==
Position: a8 black rook, b8 black knight, c8 black bishop, d8 black queen, e8 black king, f8 black bishop, g8 black knight, h8 black rook, a7 black pawn, b7 black pawn, c7 black pawn, d7 black pawn, f7 black pawn, g7 black pawn, h7 black pawn, e5 black pawn, f4 white pawn, a2 white pawn, b2 white pawn, c2 white pawn, d2 white pawn, e2 white pawn, g2 white pawn, h2 white pawn, a1 white rook, b1 white knight, c1 white bishop, d1 white queen, e1 white king, f1 white bishop, g1 white knight, h1 white rook

Black offers the e5-pawn as a gambit in From's Gambit (1.f4 e5). White might decline, offering the f4-pawn in response by transposing into the King's Gambit (2.e4).

gambit
A sacrifice (usually of a pawn) used to gain an early advantage in space or time in the opening.
See also countergambit.
game clock
See chess clock.
game score
Often shortened to score. The record of a game in some form of notation, usually algebraic notation. In over-the-board tournaments, the game score is recorded on a score sheet.
gardez
[from French: gardez la reine!, 'Protect the Queen!'] An announcement to the opponent that their queen is under direct attack, similar to the announcement of "check". This warning was customary until the early 20th century.
GM
Abbr. for Grandmaster.
God
Metaphorical; a hypothetical player who always plays perfectly.
good bishop
A bishop that has greater mobility, because the player's own pawns are on squares of the opposite color to that of the bishop.
cf. bad bishop.
Grandmaster ("GM")
The highest title a chess player can attain (besides World Champion). Awarded by FIDE, the title is valid for life unless exceptional circumstances (such as cheating) occur.
grandmaster draw
A game in which the players agree to a quick draw. Originally it referred to such games between grandmasters, but the term can now refer to any such game.
Greek gift sacrifice
A typical sacrifice of a bishop by White playing Bxh7+ or by Black playing ...Bxh2+ against a castled king to initiate a mating attack. Also known as the classical bishop sacrifice.

== H ==
half-open file
A file on which only one player has pawns. Also called semi-open file.
handicap
See odds.
hanging
Unprotected and exposed to capture. A hanging piece may also be said to be en prise.
hanging pawns
Two pawns of the same color on adjacent files, with no pawns of the same color on the files to either side of them.
harmony
See coordination.
Harrwitz bishops
See Horwitz bishops.
Harry
A nickname for the h-pawn, sometimes occurring in the expression, "Harry the h-pawn".
hauptturnier
German word that is freely translated as 'premiere tournament'. In the early part of the 20th century, it was necessary for the ambitious European amateur to win a succession of prizes in small tournaments, to progress to a higher level of competition. The creation of the hauptturnier enabled the process to become more formalized, and they became a regular feature of the major German chess congresses. Winning such an event conferred the title of 'Master of the German Chess Federation', and this, in turn, could be used to gain admittance to prestigious international tournaments. Some of the best players in chess history, such as Emanuel Lasker and Siegbert Tarrasch, secured their Master titles and advanced their chess careers in this way.
heavy piece
See major piece.

Position: b8 black king, a7 black pawn, c7 black pawn, a6 black circle, b6 black pawn, c6 black circle, d4 white pawn, e4 white circle, f4 white pawn, c3 white pawn, d3 white circle, e3 white pawn, a2 white pawn, b2 white pawn, g2 white pawn, h2 white pawn, g1 white king

The dots indicate holes.

hole
A square that is inside or near a player's territory that cannot be controlled by a pawn. It is a gap in a player's pawn configuration, and especially dangerous when the hole is close to the center or near the king. A knight landing on a hole may be part of an attack. An example of a hole is the e4-square in the Stonewall Attack.
home rank
The rank on which the pieces stand in the starting position (rank one for White; rank eight for Black). Also called back rank and first rank.
horizontal line
See rank.

Position: b8 black rook, a7 black pawn, c7 black pawn, h7 black king, b6 black bishop, c6 black pawn, d6 black pawn, g6 black rook, d5 black bishop, e5 black pawn, d3 white pawn, g3 white pawn, h3 black queen, a2 white pawn, b2 white pawn, c2 white pawn, e2 white queen, g2 white knight, h2 white bishop, a1 white rook, f1 white rook, h1 white king

After 30.Qe2. Black's Horwitz bishops are aimed at White's kingside.
Horwitz vs. Harrwitz, London 1846

Horwitz bishops
A player's light-square bishop and dark-square bishop placed so that they occupy adjacent diagonals, creating a potent attack. Also called raking bishops, and sometimes Harrwitz bishops.
human move
A move a human would make, as opposed to the kind of move that only a computer would make.
Hutton pairing
A pairing technique invented in 1921 by George Dickson Hutton for matching teams of players in which only one game is required per player. It has been used regularly for correspondence team events and for matches between many teams conducted on one day. Also called jamboree pairing.
hypermodernism
A school of thought that prefers controlling the center with pieces from the flanks as opposed to occupying it directly with pawns. Two major proponents of hypermodernism were Richard Réti and Aron Nimzowitsch.
See also classical.

== I ==
IA
Abbr. for International Arbiter.
ICCA
See International Correspondence Chess Federation.
ICCF
Abbr. for International Correspondence Chess Federation.
ICS
Abbr. for Internet chess server.
IGM
Abbr. for the older term International Grandmaster. The modern usage is Grandmaster (GM).
illegal move
A move that is not permitted by the rules of chess. An illegal move discovered during the course of a game must be corrected.
illegal position
1. A position in a game that is a consequence of an illegal move or an incorrect starting position
2. A position that is impossible to reach by any sequence of legal moves.
IM
Abbr. for International Master.
imbalance
Any difference between the positions of White and Black. An imbalanced position is one where White and Black both have unique advantages. Conversely, a balanced position may be drawish.
inaccuracy
A move that is not the best, but not as bad as a mistake or blunder.
inactive
See passive.
in check
See check.
increment
Refers to the amount of time added to each player's time before each move. For instance, rapid chess might be played with "25 minutes plus 10 second per move increment", meaning that each player starts with 25 minutes on their clock, and this increments by 10 seconds after (or before) each move, usually using the Fischer Delay method.
See also Time control § Increment and delay methods.

Position: a8 black rook, b8 black knight, c8 black bishop, d8 black queen, f8 black rook, g8 black king, a7 black pawn, b7 black pawn, c7 black pawn, e7 black pawn, f7 black pawn, g7 black bishop, h7 black pawn, d6 black pawn, f6 black knight, g6 black pawn, c4 white pawn, d4 white pawn, f3 white knight, g3 white pawn, a2 white pawn, b2 white pawn, e2 white pawn, f2 white pawn, g2 white bishop, h2 white pawn, a1 white rook, b1 white knight, c1 white bishop, d1 white queen, f1 white rook, g1 white king

In the KID Fianchetto Variation (1.d4 Nf6 2.c4 g6 3.Nf3 Bg7 4.g3 0-0 5.Bg2 d6 6.0-0), both sides have Indian bishops.

Indian bishop
A fianchettoed bishop, characteristic of Indian defenses, the King's Indian and the Queen's Indian.
Indian Defense
An opening that begins 1.d4 Nf6. Originally used to describe queen's pawn defenses involving the fianchetto of one or both black bishops; now used to describe all Black defenses after 1.d4 Nf6 that do not transpose into the Queen's Gambit.
informal game
See friendly game.
initiative
The ability to make attacking moves, and force the course of play. It is an aspect of time. The attacking player has the initiative, and the defending player attempts to seize it.
innovation
A synonym for theoretical novelty.
insufficient material
An endgame scenario in which all pawns have been captured, and one side has only its king remaining while the other has only its king, a king plus a knight, or a king plus a bishop. A king plus bishop versus a king plus bishop with the bishops on the same color is also a draw, since neither side can checkmate, regardless of play. Situations where checkmate is possible only if the inferior side blunders are covered by the fifty-move rule.
See also Draw (chess) § Draws in all games.
interference
The interruption of the line or diagonal between an attacked piece and its defender by interposing a piece.
intermediate move
See zwischenzug.
intermezzo
See zwischenzug.
International Arbiter ("IA")
A tournament official who arbitrates disputes and performs other duties such as keeping the score when players are under time pressure.
International Correspondence Chess Federation
Organization founded in 1951 to replace the International Correspondence Chess Association (ICCA).
International Grandmaster ("IGM")
The original name of the FIDE title, now simply called Grandmaster ("GM")
International Master ("IM")
A chess title that ranks below Grandmaster but above FIDE Master.
International Woman Master
Obsolete name for Woman International Master.
Internet chess server ("ICS")
An external server that provides the facility to play, discuss, and view chess over the Internet.
interpose
To move a piece between an attacking piece and its target, blocking the line of attack. Interposing is not possible if the attacker is a knight, king, or pawn; it is possible only when the attacker is a rook, bishop, or queen. Interposing a piece is one of three possible responses to a check.
Interzonal tournament
A tournament organized by the FIDE starting from the 1950s to 1993. It was the second qualifying cycle of the World Chess Championship. The participants were selected from the top players of the Zonal tournaments. The top-ranking players qualified for the Candidates Tournament. Since 1998 the winners of the zonal tournaments have played short matches against each other over a few weeks in a knockout-style competition to determine who is eligible for the Candidates Tournament.
IQP
Abbr. for isolated queen pawn. See isolani.
irregular opening
Early 19th-century chess literature classified all openings that did not begin with either 1.e4 e5 or 1.d4 d5 as "irregular". As opening theory developed and many openings previously considered "irregular" became standard (e.g. the Sicilian Defense), the term gradually became less common. Opening books today are more likely to describe debuts such as 1.b4 (the Sokolsky Opening) as "uncommon" or "unorthodox".
isolani
Refers to a d-pawn with no pawns of the same color on the adjacent c-file and e-file, and is a synonym for isolated queen pawn. Aron Nimzowitsch, who coined the term, regarded the isolani as a weapon of attack in the middlegame but an endgame weakness; he saw the problem of hanging pawns as related.
See also Pawn structure § Queen's Gambit – Isolani Formation.
isolated pawn
A pawn with no pawn of the same color on an adjacent file.
isolated queen pawn ("IQP")
Or isolated queen's pawn. See: isolani.

Position: a8 black rook, c8 black bishop, d8 black queen, e8 black king, g8 black knight, h8 black rook, a7 black pawn, b7 black pawn, c7 black pawn, d7 black pawn, f7 black pawn, g7 black pawn, h7 black pawn, c6 black knight, c5 black bishop, e5 black pawn, c4 white bishop, e4 white pawn, f3 white knight, a2 white pawn, b2 white pawn, c2 white pawn, d2 white pawn, f2 white pawn, g2 white pawn, h2 white pawn, a1 white rook, b1 white knight, c1 white bishop, d1 white queen, e1 white king, h1 white rook

Italian bishops in the Giuoco Piano

Italian bishop
A white bishop developed to c4 or a black bishop developed to c5. A bishop so developed is characteristic of the Italian Game. In the Giuoco Piano both players have Italian bishops. The Italian bishop stands in contrast to the Spanish bishop on b5 characteristic of the Ruy Lopez. "Italian" may be used as an adjective for an opening where one or both players have Italian bishops.

== J ==
j'adoube
[from French, 'I adjust', pronounced [ʒa.dub]] The international signal of the intention to adjust the position of a piece on the board. When playing with the touch-move rule, a player must say this in order to be able to touch a piece without being subject to the touched piece rule. The verb adouber, literally "to dub" (raise to the knighthood), is rarely used in contemporary French outside of this context. A local language equivalent, e.g. "I am adjusting", is generally also acceptable.

== K ==
K
Symbol used for the king when recording chess moves in English.
key square
1. An important square.
2. In pawn endings, a square whose occupation by one side's king guarantees the achievement of a certain goal, such as the promotion of a pawn or the win of a pawn. Also called critical square.
KGA
The King's Gambit Accepted opening.
KGD
The King's Gambit Declined opening.
KIA
The King's Indian Attack opening.
kibitz
As a spectator, making comments on a chess game that can be heard by the players. Kibitzing on a serious game while it is in progress (rather than during a post-mortem) is a serious breach of chess etiquette.
kick
Attacking a piece, often a knight, with a pawn, so that it will move. Kicking a piece may lead to gaining a tempo, or may force the opponent to concede control of key squares.
KID
The King's Indian Defense opening.
king
The most important piece in chess. It may move to any adjacent square, and it may castle. A king threatened with capture is in check; a player cannot end their move with their king in check. If a player's king is in check and there is no escape, then the king is in checkmate, and the player loses. If the player whose turn it is has no legal moves and their king is not in check, then it is stalemate, and the game is drawn.
king bishop
Or king's bishop. The bishop that is on the kingside at the start of the game. Sometimes abbreviated "KB".
king hunt
A sustained attack on the enemy king that results in the king being driven a far distance from its initial position, typically resulting in its checkmate. Some of the most famous games featuring king hunts are Edward Lasker–Thomas, Polugaevsky–Nezhmetdinov, and Kasparov–Topalov. Also called king chase.
king knight
Or king's knight. The knight that is on the kingside at the start of the game. Sometimes abbreviated "KN".
king pawn
Or king's pawn. A pawn on the king's file, i.e. the e-file. Sometimes abbreviated "KP". Also king bishop pawn (KBP), king knight pawn (KNP), and king rook pawn (KRP) for a pawn on the f-, g-, or h-file, respectively.
king pawn opening
Or king's pawn opening. An opening that begins 1.e4.
king rook
Or king's rook. The rook that is on the kingside at the start of the game. Sometimes abbreviated "KR".
kingside
Or king's side. The side of the board (half-board) the kings are on at the start of the game (the e- through h-file), as opposed to the queenside. Also called king's wing.
king walk
A consecutive series of king moves designed to bring the king to a safer square. For example, if a player has castled kingside but the opponent has sacrificed a piece to destroy the kingside pawn cover, they may choose to walk the king over to the queenside to shelter behind the queenside pawns.
knight
A piece that may move to any nearest square not on a rank, file, or diagonal on which it stands. In other words, it may move two squares horizontally or vertically and then one square perpendicular to that (forming an L shape), jumping over any pieces in the way.
knight pawn
Or knight's pawn. A pawn on the knight's file, i.e. the b-file or g-file. Sometimes abbreviated "NP".

Example of an open knight's tour

knight's tour
A puzzle that challenges a person to set a knight on an empty chessboard, and make the piece move around (as it moves in a chess game), but to visit every square only once. The knight's tour is the best known of a variety of tours and puzzles based on chess pieces. A closed tour (also known as a re-entrant tour) ends on the same square on which it began and needs 64 moves. An open tour ends on a different square and needs only 63 moves.
knockout tournament
See Single-elimination tournament. A tournament conducted as a series of matches in which the winner of each match advances to the next round and the loser is eliminated. Well-known chess tournaments held in the knockout format include London 1851 and the 2007 Chess World Cup.
cf. round-robin tournament and Swiss tournament.
Kotov syndrome
This phenomenon, described by Alexander Kotov in his 1971 book Think Like a Grandmaster, can occur when a player does not find a good plan after thinking long and hard on a position. The player, under time pressure, then suddenly decides to make a move that they have hardly thought about at all, and it may not be a good move for that reason.
Kriegspiel
[from German, 'war game'] Kriegspiel is a chess variant played by two opponents who can see only their own board, and one monitoring umpire who makes the moves of both players on a neutral board. It requires three chess sets and boards. The players make their moves based on limited information from the umpire. It was introduced in 1898. It is sometimes referred to as blind chess, not to be confused with blindfold chess.
Kt
The symbol sometimes used for the knight when recording chess moves in descriptive notation, mainly in older literature. An N is used instead in algebraic notation and in later descriptive notation to avoid confusion with K, the symbol for the king.

== L ==
last rank
See eighth rank.
laws of chess
The rules of chess.
lightning chess
A form of chess with an extremely short time limit, either blitz chess or bullet chess.
light-square bishop
Often shortened to light bishop. One of the two bishops that moves only on the light squares. In the starting position, White's light-square bishop is on f1; Black's is on c8.
cf. dark-square bishop.
light squares
The 32 light-colored squares on the chessboard, such as h1 and a8.
cf. dark squares.
line
1. A sequence of moves, usually in the opening or in analyzing a position.
2. An open path for a piece (queen, rook, or bishop) to move or control squares.
line piece
A piece whose movement is defined to be along straight lines of squares (i.e. the rook, bishop, and queen).
liquidation
See simplification.
long castling
See castling long.
long diagonal
One of the two diagonals with eight squares (a1–h8 or h1–a8).

Position: a8 black rook, b8 black knight, c8 black bishop, d8 black queen, e8 black king, f8 black bishop, g8 black knight, h8 black rook, a7 black pawn, b7 black pawn, c7 black pawn, d7 black pawn, f7 black pawn, g7 black pawn, h7 black pawn, e5 black pawn, g4 white pawn, a2 white pawn, b2 white pawn, c2 white pawn, d2 white pawn, e2 white pawn, f2 white pawn, g2 white bishop, h2 white pawn, a1 white rook, b1 white knight, c1 white bishop, d1 white queen, e1 white king, g1 white knight, h1 white rook

A long fianchetto in Grob's Attack (1.g4 e5 2.Bg2)

long fianchetto
A fianchetto whereby the knight's pawn has advanced two squares (b4 or g4 for White; b5 or g5 for Black) instead of one.
long-range piece
A bishop, rook, or queen.
loose piece
A piece vulnerable to opponent attacks because it is undefended and cannot easily be withdrawn or supported.
loose position
A position vulnerable to opponent attacks because it is overextended or its pieces are uncoordinated.
losing a tempo
See tempo.
loss
A defeat for one of the two players, which may occur due to that player being checkmated by the other player, resigning, exceeding the time control, or being forfeited by the tournament director. In chess, a zero-sum game, this results in a win for the other player.

Position: b8 white king, d8 black king, b7 white pawn, a2 black rook, c1 white rook

Lucena position: White wins by 1.Rd1+ Ke7 2.Rd4! Ra1 3.Kc7 Rc1+ 4.Kb6 Rb1+ 5.Kc6 Rc1+ 6.Kb5 Rb1+ 7.Rb4 and the pawn queens.

Lucena position
A well-known rook and pawn versus rook endgame position in which the player with the extra pawn can force a win by cutting off the opponent's king and placing a rook on the 4th rank in order to block the opponent's rook checks, thereby allowing the pawn to queen.
luft
[from German 'air'] Space made for a castled king to give it a flight square to prevent a back-rank mate. Usually luft is made by moving a pawn on the second rank in front of the king.
See also flight square.

== M ==
main line
The principal, most important, or most often played variation of an opening.
majority
A larger number of pawns on one flank opposed by a smaller number of the opponent's; often a player with a majority on one flank has a minority on the other. A central pawn majority is a larger number of pawns on the center files.
major piece
A queen or rook, also known as a heavy piece. The primary distinction of major pieces versus minor pieces is that major pieces are capable of checkmate with only their own king for support, as the enemy king is unable to step across the ranks and files they control. On an otherwise empty board, a major piece can move from any square to any other square in at most two moves.
man
A piece or a pawn, when the term "piece" is used as exclusive of pawns.

Position: a8 black rook, c8 black bishop, d8 black queen, e8 black king, f8 black bishop, g8 black knight, h8 black rook, a7 black pawn, b7 black pawn, d7 black pawn, e7 black pawn, f7 black pawn, h7 black pawn, c6 black knight, g6 black pawn, c4 white pawn, d4 white knight, e4 white pawn, a2 white pawn, b2 white pawn, f2 white pawn, g2 white pawn, h2 white pawn, a1 white rook, b1 white knight, c1 white bishop, d1 white queen, e1 white king, f1 white bishop, h1 white rook

A typical Maróczy Bind position

Maróczy Bind
A bind on the light squares in the center, particularly d5, obtained by White by placing pawns on c4 and e4. Named for Géza Maróczy, it originally referred to formations arising in some variations of the Sicilian Defense, but the name is now also applied to similar setups in the English Opening and the Queen's Indian Defense. It was once greatly feared by Black but means of countering it have been developed since the 1980s and earlier.
master
Loosely, a strong chess player who would be expected to beat most amateurs. It may also refer to a formal title such as International Master or National Master. Standards vary, but a master will usually have an Elo rating of over 2200.
match
The term "match" does not refer to an individual game of chess, but to either a competition between two teams or a series of games between two individuals. A match may be the entire competition, or it may be a round in a knockout tournament or team tournament. A match between individuals usually consists of several games, continuing until one of the players has achieved either a set score or a set number of wins.
mate
Short for checkmate.
material
A player's pieces and pawns on the board. The player with pieces and pawns of total greater value is said to have a material advantage. Gaining a material advantage is called winning material. See Chess piece relative value.
materialism
Playstyle characterized by a willingness to win material at the expense of positional considerations. Chess engines historically were often materialistic.
mating attack
An attack aimed at checkmating the enemy king.
mating net
A position or series of moves that leads to forced mate.
MCO
Abbr. for Modern Chess Openings, a popular chess opening reference. Often the edition is also given, as in MCO-14, the 14th edition.
cf. ECO.
middlegame
The part of a chess game that follows the opening and comes before the endgame, beginning after the pieces are developed in the opening. This is usually roughly moves 20 through 40.
miniature
A short game (usually no more than 20 to 25 moves), for example: 1.e3 e5 2.Qf3 d5 3.Nc3 e4 4.Qf4?? Bd6! and White resigned in Spiel–Künzel, Europe 1900, because the queen is trapped. However, some authors include games up to 30 moves. Usually only decisive games (not draws) are considered miniatures. Ideally, a miniature should not be spoiled by an obvious blunder by the losing side. A miniature may also qualify as a brilliancy. The Opera Game is a famous example. Sometimes called a brevity [chiefly British].
See also Glossary of chess problems § miniature.
minor exchange
The exchange of a bishop for a knight.
minority
A smaller number of pawns on one flank opposed by a larger number of the opponent's; often a player with a minority on one flank has a majority on the other.

Position: a7 black pawn, b7 black pawn, f7 black pawn, g7 black pawn, h7 black pawn, c6 black pawn, d5 black pawn, d4 white pawn, e3 white pawn, a2 white pawn, b2 white pawn, f2 white pawn, g2 white pawn, h2 white pawn

White might initiate a minority attack by advancing the a- and b-pawns.

minority attack
An advance of pawns on the side of the board where one has fewer pawns than the opponent, an attack strategy usually carried out to provoke a weakness.
minor piece
A bishop or knight. Unlike major pieces, minor pieces are unable to contain the enemy king or block his advance alone, as he can simply pass through the holes in their line of attack. Compared to major pieces, minor pieces also find it difficult to navigate the entire board; a knight may require four moves to reach a square two squares away, while a bishop can only ever control half of all squares.
mobile pawn center
Pawns on central squares able to advance without becoming weak.
mobility
The ability of a piece(s) to move around the board. Having space.
move
1. A turn taken by one of the players, moving a piece to a new square (sometimes with the capture of an opponent's piece or the promotion of a pawn) or castling.
2. A turn by both players, White and Black: for example, in the context of the 50-move rule, or when referring to the duration or stage of a game (as in "the position after move 15" or "the game ended after 27 moves"). A turn by either White or Black may then be called a half-move, or (in computer contexts) one ply.
move order
The sequence of moves one chooses to play an opening or execute a plan. Different move orders often have different advantages and disadvantages. A plan that uses certain moves can sometimes be improved by making the identical moves but in a different sequence.
See also transposition.
mysterious rook move
Coined by Nimzowitsch to refer to the placing of a rook on a closed file in anticipation that the opponent is going to open the file. This move may either achieve a position with a rook on an open file, or it may alternatively hinder the opponent's intentions (prophylaxis). The meaning of the word has since expanded to refer to any rook move that appears to have a hidden purpose.

== N ==
N
1. Symbol used for the knight when recording chess moves in English.
2. Abbr. for novelty.
NCO
Abbr. for Nunn's Chess Openings, a chess openings reference.
cf. ECO and MCO.
NN
Traditionally used in game scores to indicate a player whose name is not known, or whose name the editor chooses not to publish (usually the loser). The origin is uncertain. It may be an abbreviation of the Latin nomina ("names"), or it may be short for the Latin phrase nomen nescio ("name unknown"). Sometimes N.N.
norm
A step toward earning a chess title, such as Grandmaster or International Master. To qualify for the award of norms, a tournament must be rated by FIDE, must be sufficiently strong, must include a mix of nationalities, must include a specified number of titled players, and must meet certain other requirements regarding time control and playing conditions. The score necessary to qualify for a norm depends on the strength of the tournament. In practice, three norms are usually required for a title, though regulations have varied over the years.
notation
Any method of recording chess moves, allowing games to be later published, replayed, and analyzed. The most common notation today is algebraic notation, which is used internationally. Formerly descriptive notation was standard in English language publications. There are also systems of notation for recording chess positions without the use of diagrams, the most common of which is Forsyth–Edwards Notation (FEN).
cf. annotation.
novelty
See theoretical novelty.

== O ==
occupation
Occupation of a rank or file means a rook or queen controls it; occupation of a square means a piece or pawn sits on it.
octopus
A strongly positioned knight in enemy territory. A knight not near the edge reaches out in eight directions, like the eight tentacles of an octopus.
odds
This refers to the stronger player giving the weaker player some sort of advantage in order to make the game more competitive. It may be an advantage in material, in extra moves, in time on the clock, or some combination of those elements. Since the advent of the chess clock, time odds have become more common than material odds.
offhand game
See skittles.
Olympiad
An international team chess tournament organized biennially by FIDE. Each team represents a FIDE member country.

Position: a8 black rook, b8 black knight, c8 black bishop, d8 black queen, e8 black king, f8 black bishop, g8 black knight, h8 black rook, a7 black pawn, b7 black pawn, c7 black pawn, f7 black pawn, g7 black pawn, h7 black pawn, d5 black pawn, d4 white pawn, a2 white pawn, b2 white pawn, c2 white pawn, f2 white pawn, g2 white pawn, h2 white pawn, a1 white rook, b1 white knight, c1 white bishop, d1 white queen, e1 white king, f1 white bishop, g1 white knight, h1 white rook

The e-file is open in the French Defense, Exchange Variation after 3.exd5 exd5.

open file
A file on which there are no pawns.
cf. half-open file.
open game
Or open position. A game in which exchanges have opened files and diagonals, and there are few pawns in the center, as opposed to a closed game.
See also positional play.
Open Game
Any opening that begins with the moves 1.e4 e5. Examples of Open Games include the Ruy Lopez, the Giuoco Piano, the Danish Gambit, and many others. The Open Game is also referred to as a Double King's Pawn Opening or Double King's Pawn Game.
cf. Closed Game.
See also Semi-Open Game.
opening
The beginning phase of the game, roughly the first dozen moves, but it can extend much farther. In the opening players set up their pawn structures, develop their pieces, and usually castle. The opening precedes the middlegame.
opening innovation
A synonym for theoretical novelty.
opening preparation
Home study and analysis of openings and defenses that one expects to play, or meet, in later tournament or match games. In high-level play, an important part of this is the search for theoretical novelties that improve upon previous play or previously published analysis.
opening repertoire
The set of openings played by a particular player. The breadth of different players' repertoires varies from very narrow to very broad.
opening system
An opening that is defined by a series of moves by one player, where the moves can be made independently (to some extent) of the moves chosen by the opponent, and are usually not required to be made in a fixed move order, with the goal of reaching a certain type of middlegame position. One example is the Colle System, characterized by an early e3 from White, intending to place the queen's bishop on b2; the London System is another frequently played opening system. Openings for Black can also be described as opening systems, such as the King's Indian Defense.
open lines
1. n. Unobstructed files and diagonals.
See also open game.
2. v. To move or exchange pawns to bring about unobstructed files and diagonals.
open tournament
A tournament where anyone can enter, regardless of rating or invitation.
cf. closed tournament.
opposite castling
Or opposite-side castling. Describes when one player has castled kingside and the opponent has castled queenside.
opposite-colored bishops
See bishops on opposite colors.
opposition
A position in which two kings stand on the same rank, file, or diagonal with one empty square between them. The player to move may be forced to move the king to a less advantageous square. Opposition is a particularly important concept in endgames. One orthogonal square separation is direct opposition; one diagonal square is diagonal opposition; multiple squares separation is distant opposition.
cf. corresponding squares.
optimal play
See Best response. Both sides playing their best move at each turn, or one of equally good alternatives. One side tries to win as quickly as possible while the other side tries to delay it as long as possible, or optimal play may result in a draw.
cf. Solved game § Perfect play.
OTB
Abbr. for over the board.
outpost
An outpost is a square protected by a pawn that is in or near the enemy's stronghold. Outposts are a favorable position from which one can launch an attack, particularly using a knight.
outside passed pawn
A passed pawn near the edge of the board and not in the path of threats from the opponent's pawns. In the endgame, such a pawn can constitute a strong advantage, because it threatens to promote, and it also diverts the opponent's forces to restrain its advance.
overextended
An overextended position results when a player has advanced pawns too far into the opponent's side without sufficient support. The premature advance can leave weaknesses in the player's camp or the advanced pawns themselves may be weak ("overextended pawns").
overloaded
A piece that has too many defensive duties. An overloaded piece can sometimes be deflected, or required to abandon one of its defensive duties.
overprotection
The strategy of protecting an important pawn or square more than is apparently necessary. This serves to dissuade the opponent from attacking that point, and the latent power of the "over protectors" assembled around an important point is a significant threat that can bear fruit at a small tactical change in the position. Aron Nimzowitsch coined the term and was a proponent of overprotection.
over the board ("OTB")
1. An over-the-board game is played face to face with the opponent, as opposed to a remote opponent as in online chess or correspondence chess.
2. Analysis carried out during a game in real time (not necessarily a face-to-face game) as opposed to during preparation. Finding accurate moves over the board is harder than finding them with computer assistance in one's own time. "I looked up the gambit Smith played and there's a line that refutes it, but I couldn't find it over the board."
overworked
See overloaded.

== P ==
P
Symbol used for the pawn when recording chess positions in English; a lowercase p is typically used for a Black pawn. Also used for the pawn when recording chess moves in descriptive notation, e.g. P-K4.
paired bishops
See bishop pair.
pairing
The assignment of opponents in a tournament. The most common pairing methods used in chess tournaments are round-robin and the Swiss system.
passar battaglia
[from Italian, 'to dodge the fight'] The former rule that a pawn could evade capture by an opposing pawn by its initial two-square advance, in contrast to the en passant rule. Passar battaglia remained the practice in several parts of Europe long after en passant was introduced, and it was not completely abandoned until 1880 when Italy adopted the en passant rule.

Position: e8 black king, b7 white pawn, f7 black pawn, f6 black knight, g6 black pawn, a5 black pawn, d5 black pawn, a4 white pawn, e4 white pawn, c3 white bishop, d2 white king

White with a passed pawn on b7. Black has a passed pawn on g6. The black pawn on f7 is not passed because the white pawn on e4 is adjacent and can threaten it.

passed pawn
A pawn that has no pawn of the opposite color on its file or on an adjacent file to challenge or threaten its potential for queening.
passer
A passed pawn.
passive
Describes a piece or pawn that is inactive and able to move to or control relatively few squares, or a position without possibilities for attack or counterplay.
Antonym: active.
passive sacrifice
The sacrifice of a piece, by moving a different piece, leaving the sacrificed piece under attack.
pattern recognition
A part of chess thinking that involves remembering and recognizing certain recurring positional aspects large and small, visual and dynamic. It is a kind of thinking that gives an advantage to a player with great experience. It is distinct from the intellectual activity of calculation. It uses intuitive thinking that is familiar to humans, but is foreign to computers. It can be developed by studying chess puzzles. It has been studied by Adriaan de Groot, and other scientists, who have attempted to discover how chess players think.
patzer
[from German: patzen, 'to bungle'] A weak chess player.
See also woodpusher.
pawn
A piece that can move one square directly forward, or on its first move, can move two squares directly forward. It can also move one square diagonally forward when capturing. It may capture en passant. Upon reaching its eighth rank, it is promoted to a same-colored queen, rook, bishop, or knight.
pawn and move
A type of odds game, common in the 18th and 19th centuries, in which the superior player plays Black and begins the game with one of their pawns, usually the king bishop pawn, removed from the board; plus White gets an extra move at the start.
pawn break
A pawn move that attacks an enemy pawn in order to open up lines or challenge the opponent's pawn structure.
See also break.

Position: a8 black rook, b8 black knight, c8 black bishop, d8 black queen, f8 black rook, g8 black king, a7 black pawn, b7 black pawn, c7 black pawn, e7 black pawn, f7 black pawn, g7 black bishop, h7 black pawn, d6 black pawn, f6 black knight, g6 black pawn, c4 white pawn, d4 white pawn, e4 white pawn, f4 white pawn, c3 white knight, a2 white pawn, b2 white pawn, g2 white pawn, h2 white pawn, a1 white rook, c1 white bishop, d1 white queen, e1 white king, f1 white bishop, g1 white knight, h1 white rook

White has a large pawn center in the King's Indian Defense, Four Pawns Attack.

Position: a8 black rook, c8 black bishop, e8 black king, f8 black bishop, g8 black knight, h8 black rook, a7 black pawn, b7 black pawn, f7 black pawn, g7 black pawn, h7 black pawn, b6 black queen, c6 black knight, e6 black pawn, d5 black pawn, e5 white pawn, c4 black pawn, d4 white pawn, a3 white pawn, c3 white pawn, f3 white knight, b2 white pawn, f2 white pawn, g2 white pawn, h2 white pawn, a1 white rook, b1 white knight, c1 white bishop, d1 white queen, e1 white king, f1 white bishop, h1 white rook

Pawn chains in the French Defense, Advance Variation

pawn center
Or pawn centre. A player's pawns in the center of the board. Pawns on the squares adjacent to the center may also be considered part of the pawn center. Having a strong pawn center was considered absolutely essential until the hypermodernist school introduced some new ideas. Often shortened to center. See King's Indian Defense, Four Pawns Attack for an example of an opening leading to an extended pawn center.
pawn chain
Two or more pawns of the same color diagonally linked. A pawn chain's weakest point is the base because it is not protected by another pawn.
See also pawn structure.

Position: a8 black rook, d8 black queen, e8 black king, h8 black rook, a7 black pawn, c7 black pawn, d7 black bishop, f7 black pawn, g7 black pawn, h7 black pawn, c6 black pawn, c5 black bishop, d5 black pawn, e5 white pawn, e4 white bishop, a2 white pawn, b2 white pawn, c2 white pawn, f2 white pawn, g2 white pawn, h2 white pawn, a1 white rook, b1 white knight, c1 white bishop, d1 white queen, e1 white king, h1 white rook

Black has three pawn islands and White has two. The pawn on e5 is not isolated because it is adjacent to a file that has a white pawn.
Lichtenhein vs. Morphy, 1857

pawn island
A group of pawns of one color on consecutive files with no other pawns of the same color on an adjacent file. A pawn island consisting of one pawn is an isolated pawn.
pawn majority
See majority.
pawn minority
See minority.
pawn race
A situation where both opponents are pushing a passed pawn in effort to be first to promote.
pawn roller
Two connected passed pawns. "Roller" refers to their ability to defend one another as they advance toward promotion.
pawn skeleton
See pawn structure.
pawn storm
An attacking technique where a group of pawns on one wing is advanced to break up the defense.
pawn structure
The placement of the pawns during the course of a game. As pawns are the least mobile of the pieces and the only pieces unable to move backwards, the position of the pawns greatly influences the character of the game. Also called pawn skeleton.
PCA
Abbr. for Professional Chess Association.
PCO
Abbr. for Practical Chess Openings, the 1948 openings reference book by Reuben Fine. In 2025, another openings reference book of the same name, written by Martyn Kravtsiv, was published.
cf. ECO and MCO.
performance rating ("PR")
A number reflecting the approximate rating level at which a player performed in a particular tournament or match. It is often calculated by adding together the player's performances in each individual game, using the opponent's rating for a draw, adding 400 points to the opponent's rating for a win, and subtracting 400 points from the opponent's rating for a loss, then dividing by the total number of games. For example, a player who beat a 2400-rated player, lost to a 2600, drew a 2500, and beat a 2300, would have a performance rating of 2550 (i.e. 2800 + 2200 + 2500 + 2700, divided by 4).
perpetual check
Often shortened to perpetual. When a player puts the opponent in check and the check could be repeated endlessly, the game will be declared a draw by repetition. This tactic can be resorted to as a form of insurance in a losing position.
PGN
Abbr. for Portable Game Notation.
Philidor position
Usually refers to an important chess endgame that illustrates a drawing technique when the defender has a king and rook versus a king, rook, and pawn. It is also known as the third rank defense, because of the importance of the rook on the third rank cutting off the opposing king. It was analyzed by Philidor in 1777.
See also Rook and pawn versus rook endgame.
Philidor sacrifice
The sacrifice of a minor piece for one or two pawns for greater pawn mobility as compensation.
piece
1. One of the chessmen or figures used to play the game – that is, a king, queen, rook, bishop, knight or pawn. Each piece type has its own rules of movement on the board and of capturing enemy pieces. This is the definition used in the context of rules of chess – for example, the touched piece rule.
2. When annotating or discussing chess games, the term "piece" usually excludes pawns. It may be used collectively for all "non-pawns" – for example, "White's pieces are well-posted." In some contexts, it may refer specifically to a minor piece – for example, "White is up two pieces for a rook."
pin
When a piece is attacked but cannot legally move, because doing so would expose the player's own king to the attack ("absolute pin"); or when a piece is attacked and can legally move out of the line of attack, but such a move would expose a more valuable piece (or an unprotected piece) to capture ("relative pin").
playable
Said of an opening, a position, or move that affords the person playing it a tenable position.
play by hand
To make a move intuitively and without analyzing the move.
ply
Term mainly used in computer chess to denote one play of either White or Black. Thus equal to half a move.

Position: a8 black rook, b8 black knight, c8 black bishop, e8 black king, f8 black bishop, h8 black rook, b7 black pawn, f7 black pawn, g7 black pawn, h7 black pawn, a6 black pawn, d6 black pawn, e6 black pawn, f6 black knight, g5 white bishop, d4 white knight, e4 white pawn, f4 white pawn, c3 white knight, a2 white pawn, b2 black queen, c2 white pawn, d2 white queen, g2 white pawn, h2 white pawn, a1 white rook, e1 white king, f1 white bishop, h1 white rook

Black has accepted the poisoned b2-pawn with 8...Qxb2 in the Sicilian Defense, Najdorf Variation.

poisoned pawn
An unprotected pawn that, if captured, causes positional problems or material loss.
Poisoned Pawn Variation
Any of several opening varitions, the best-known of these being in the Najdorf Variation of the Sicilian Defense, in which there is a poisoned pawn.
Portable Game Notation ("PGN")
This is a popular computer-processible ASCII format for recording chess games (both the moves and related data). There are import and export versions: the import version is lax, while the export version is not.
position
"The disposition of pieces and pawns, of one or both colours, at any stage of the game or as set in a composition." If one side has an overall advantage in strength, that side is said to have "the better position". If neither side has an overall advantage, the position might be called level or equal or balanced. The position of chessmen at the beginning of a game is called an array.
positional play
Play based on strategy, on gaining and exploiting small advantages, and on analyzing the larger position, rather than calculating the more immediate tactics.
cf. antipositional.
positional player
A player who specializes in positional play, as distinguished from a tactician.
positional sacrifice
A sacrifice in which the lost material is not regained via a combination, but instead gains positional compensation. These typically require deep positional understanding and are often overlooked by computers. Also known as a true sacrifice, as opposed to a pseudo sacrifice or sham sacrifice.
postal chess
See correspondence chess.
post mortem
Analysis of a game after it has concluded, typically by one or both players and sometimes with spectators (kibitzers) contributing as well. A player who has just lost the game thanks to a dubious move has the chance to "win the post-mortem" by finding a better one.
PR
Abbr. for performance rating.
premove
In online chess, a move input that is made during the opponent's turn, to take effect only after the opponent has moved. Premoving, the act of making premoves, is a popular way of saving time in blitz and bullet formats.
preparation
See opening preparation.
prepared variation
A well-analyzed novelty in the opening that is not published but first used against an opponent in competitive play.
Principle of two weaknesses
A technique of increasing one's advantage by causing the opponent, who has one weakness, to have a second weakness. Even if both weaknesses are minor, the fact of having two, in practice, becomes a major weakness.
priyome
A Russian term for particular tactics that depend on pawn structure.
problem-like
An elegant and counterintuitive tactical shot, of the type generally found in chess problems rather than in actual play, can be termed problem-like.
promotion
Advancing a pawn to the eighth rank, converting it to a queen, rook, bishop, or knight. Promotion to a piece other than a queen is called underpromotion.
prophylaxis
A strategy that frustrates and protects against an opponent's plan or tactic for fear of the consequences.
See also blockade, overprotection, and mysterious rook move.
protected passed pawn
A passed pawn that is supported by another pawn.
protection
A piece is protected when another friendly piece controls its square. This somewhat protects the first piece from capture, as there is the option to recapture. This is especially effective if the attacking piece is of greater value than the threatened piece.
pruning
Chess engines usually include an algorithm to eliminate certain moves from consideration, assuming that they are blunders and therefore irrelevant to the final move selection. Forward pruning runs the risk of overlooking the best move; this risk may be slight to moderate depending on how aggressively the pruning algorithm is set. Alpha–beta pruning is considered a form of backward pruning, which does not risk overlooking the best move.
pseudo sacrifice
See sham sacrifice.
push
1. v. To move a pawn forward.
2. n. A pawn move forward.

== Q ==
Q
Symbol used for the queen when recording chess moves in English.
QGA
The Queen's Gambit Accepted opening.
QGD
The Queen's Gambit Declined opening.
QID
The Queen's Indian Defense opening.
quad
A round-robin style tournament between four players, where each participant plays every other participant once.
queen
1. n. A piece that may move along ranks, files, and diagonals without jumping.
2. v. To promote a pawn.
queen bishop
Or queen's bishop. The bishop that is on the queenside at the start of the game. Sometimes abbreviated "QB".
queening
Promotion to a queen. Also called promoting. Rarely used to indicate promotion to a knight, rook, or bishop (i.e. underpromotion) as well.
queen knight
Or queen's knight. The knight that is on the queenside at the start of the game. Sometimes abbreviated "QN".
queen pawn
Or queen's pawn. A pawn on the queen's file, i.e. the d-file. Sometimes abbreviated "QP". Also queen rook pawn (QRP), queen knight pawn (QNP), and queen bishop pawn (QBP) for a pawn on the a-, b-, or c-file, respectively.
queen pawn opening
Or queen's pawn opening. An opening that begins 1.d4.
queen rook
Or queen's rook. The rook that is on the queenside at the start of the game. Sometimes abbreviated "QR".
queenside
Or queen's side. The side of the board (board-half) the queens are on at the start of the game (the a- through d-file), as opposed to the kingside. Also called queen's wing.
question
Usually in the form "put the question to [a piece]", to force the opponent to commit to a strategic decision regarding the future of a piece. Most commonly used to refer to a one-square advance of a rook's pawn to attack a bishop that is pinning or pressuring a knight, forcing the opponent to decide whether to retreat the bishop or exchange it for the knight. "Putting the question to the bishop" may resolve the pin, but can also weaken the player's pawn structure. This usage originates in Aron Nimzowitsch's My System (1925).
quickplay finish
The same as sudden death.
quiet move
A move that does not attack or capture an enemy piece.

== R ==
R
Symbol used for the rook when recording chess moves in English.
Rabar Classification
A system of opening classification codes introduced by Braslav Rabar for Chess Informant. The system was used by Informant publications from 1966 to 1981 but has since been replaced by ECO codes.
raking bishops
Another term for Horwitz bishops.
randomized chess
"A form of unorthodox chess designed to discount knowledge of the openings. The pawns are placed as in the array and behind them the pieces are placed in unorthodox fashion."
See also Fischerandom.

Position: a8 eight, d8 black queen, e8 black king, h8 one, a7 seven, d7 black pawn, e7 black pawn, h7 two, a6 six, h6 three, a5 five, h5 four, a4 four, h4 five, a3 three, h3 six, a2 two, d2 white pawn, e2 white pawn, h2 seven, a1 one, d1 white queen, e1 white king, h1 eight

White's ranks are indicated on the left (a-file); Black's relative reference to ranks are indicated on the right (h-file).

rank
A row of squares of the chessboard. In algebraic notation, ranks are numbered 1–8 starting from White's side of the board; however, players customarily refer to ranks from their own perspectives. For example: White's king and other pieces start on their first (or "back" or "home") rank, whereas Black calls the same rank the "eighth" (or last) rank; White's seventh rank is Black's second; and so on. If neither perspective is given, White's view is assumed. This relative reference to ranks was formalized in the older descriptive notation.
rapid chess
A form of chess with reduced time limit, usually 30 minutes per player. Also called active chess and action chess.
rating
See Elo rating system.
recapture
The capture of an opponent's piece that previously made a capture, and usually played immediately following the opponent's capture move. The capture and recapture occur on the same square, and usually the pieces captured and recaptured have the same value.
refute
To demonstrate that a strategy, move, or opening is not as good as previously thought (often, that it leads to a loss), or that previously published analysis is unsound. A refutation is sometimes colloquially referred to as a bust. A refutation in the context of chess problems or endgame studies is often called a cook.
related squares
See corresponding squares.
relative pin
A pin where it is legal to move the pinned piece out of the line of attack. The piece is not pinned therefore to the king, but instead to some other piece. Contrast with absolute pin where the pinned piece is not permitted to move, because the piece it is pinned to is the king.
remis
[from French] A draw. It literally means 'reset' and is somewhat archaic (the usual word for a draw in modern French is nulle), but is internationally understood and may be used between players without a common language.
repertoire
See opening repertoire.
reply
Any move by Black after a move by White, or vice versa.
reserve tempo
A move a player has available. Such a move may not be crucial to the position on the board, but being able to force the opponent to move by making a reserve move can on occasion result in a significant advantage.
resign
To concede loss of the game. A resignation is usually indicated by stopping the clocks, sometimes by offering a handshake, or by saying "I resign". A traditional way to resign is by tipping over one's king. It is common for a game to be resigned, rather than for it to end with checkmate, because experienced players can foresee the checkmate. However, under FIDE Laws, a player's resignation results in a draw if there is no sequence of legal moves that could lead to their opponent checkmating them.
resign on time
A player who intentionally runs out of time to avoid having to resign in a hopeless position can be said to have resigned on time. This is usually performed in a more subtle manner than that of Curt von Bardeleben walking out of the tournament hall against Wilhelm Steinitz. A player low on time and in a losing position may simply "forget" to pay any attention to the clock. Resigning on time when a considerable amount of time was left beforehand is called "stalling" and is considered bad sportsmanship.
reverse opening
See colors reversed.
roll
To move a passed pawn forward, especially to promotion.
See also pawn roller.
Romantic chess
Romantic chess was the style of chess prevalent in the 19th century. It is characterized by bold attacks and sacrifices.
rook
A piece that may move along ranks and files without jumping.
rook lift
A maneuver that places a rook in front of its own pawns, often on the third or fourth rank. This can allow the rook to treat a half-open file as if it were an open file, or a closed file as if it were half-open.
rook pawn
Or rook's pawn. A pawn on the rook's file, i.e. the a-file or h-file. Sometimes abbreviated "RP".
round-robin tournament
This is a tournament in which each participant plays every other participant an equal number of times. In a double round-robin tournament the participants play each other exactly twice, once with white and once with black. A round robin tournament is commonly used if the number of participants is relatively small.
See also Swiss tournament.
royal fork
A fork threatening the king and queen, typically performed with a knight.
royal piece
A king or queen. In chess variants, the term refers to any piece that must be protected from capture; under this definition, only the king is royal in orthodox chess.

== S ==
S
[from German: Springer 'jumper'] Alternative notation for the knight. Used rather than K, which means king.
sac
Short for sacrifice, usually used to describe a sacrifice for a mating attack.
sacrifice
A move or capture that voluntarily gives up material in return for an advantage such as space, development, or an attack. A sacrifice in the opening is called a gambit, especially when applied to a pawn.
SAN
Abbr. for standard algebraic notation or short algebraic notation (e.g. 1.Nf3), as opposed to long algebraic notation (e.g. 1.Ng1-f3).
sans voir
[from French] See blindfold chess.
scalp
[slang] To defeat a much higher-ranked player, especially a titled player.

An example of Scholar's mate

Scholar's mate
A four-move checkmate (common among novices) in which White plays 1.e4, follows with Qh5 (or Qf3) and Bc4, and finishes with 4.Qxf7#.
score
1. The recorded moves in a game. See game score.
2. A player's score in a match or tournament, which is almost always 1 point for each win and ½ point for each draw. See Chess scoring.

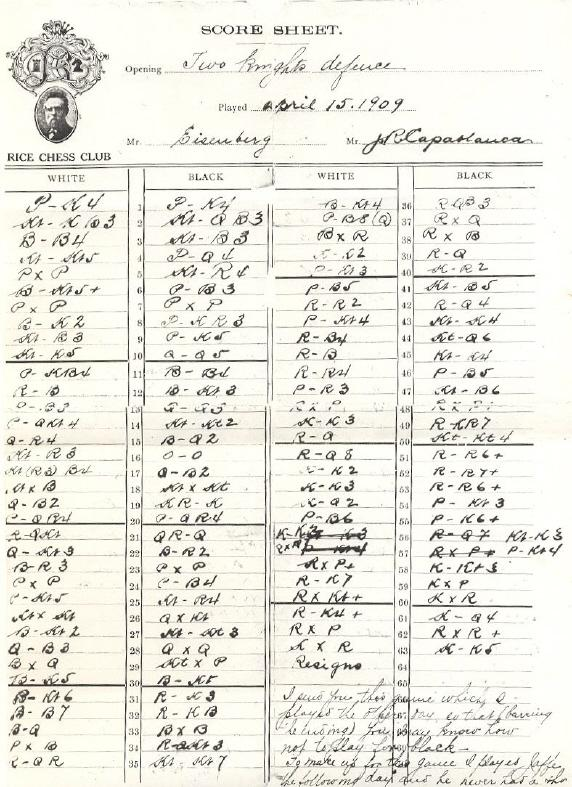
A score sheet

score sheet
The sheet of paper used to record a game in progress. During formal games, it is usual for both players to record the game using a score sheet. A completed score sheet contains the game score.
sealed move
To prevent unfair advantage when an OTB game is adjourned, the player whose turn it is to move is required to write down their next move and put it in a sealed envelope. Upon resumption, the arbiter opens the sealed envelope, makes the move and the game continues. The player may be disqualified if the sealed move is illegal, ambiguous or unclear. Adjournments and sealed moves are no longer standard practice.
See also Adjournment (games).
second
An assistant hired to help a player in preparation for and during a major match or tournament. The second assists in areas such as opening preparation. The second also used to assist with adjournment analysis before the practice of adjournments was largely abandoned in the 1990s.
second player
The expression "the second player" is sometimes used to refer to Black.
seesaw
See windmill.
Semi-Closed Game
An opening that begins with White playing 1.d4 and Black replying with a move other than 1...d5. Also called half-closed game.
See also Closed Game.
semi-open file
See half-open file.
Semi-Open Game
An opening that begins with White playing 1.e4 and Black replying with a move other than 1...e5. Also called half-open game.
See also Open Game.
seventy-five-move rule
The game is drawn if no capture or pawn move has occurred in the last seventy-five moves by either side. The fifty-move rule operates on a similar principle but is invoked at a player's discretion instead of automatically.
sham sacrifice
An offer of material that is made at no risk, as acceptance would lead to the gain of equal or greater material or checkmate. This is in contrast to a true sacrifice in which the compensation is less tangible. Also called pseudo sacrifice.
sharp
Highly tactical, risky, double-edged, few available accurate moves. Sharp can be used to describe moves, maneuvers, positions, opening lines, and styles of play.
short castling
See castling short.
shot
[colloq.] An unexpected or sharp move that typically makes a tactical threat or technical challenge for the opponent.
silent move
A move that has a dynamic tactical effect on a position, but that does not capture or attack an enemy piece.
See also quiet move.
simplification
A strategy of exchanging pieces, often with one of the following goals: as a defensive measure to reduce the size of an attacking force; when having the advantage to reduce the opponent's counterplay; to try to obtain a draw; or as an attempt to gain an advantage by players who are strong in endgame play with simplified positions. Also called liquidation.

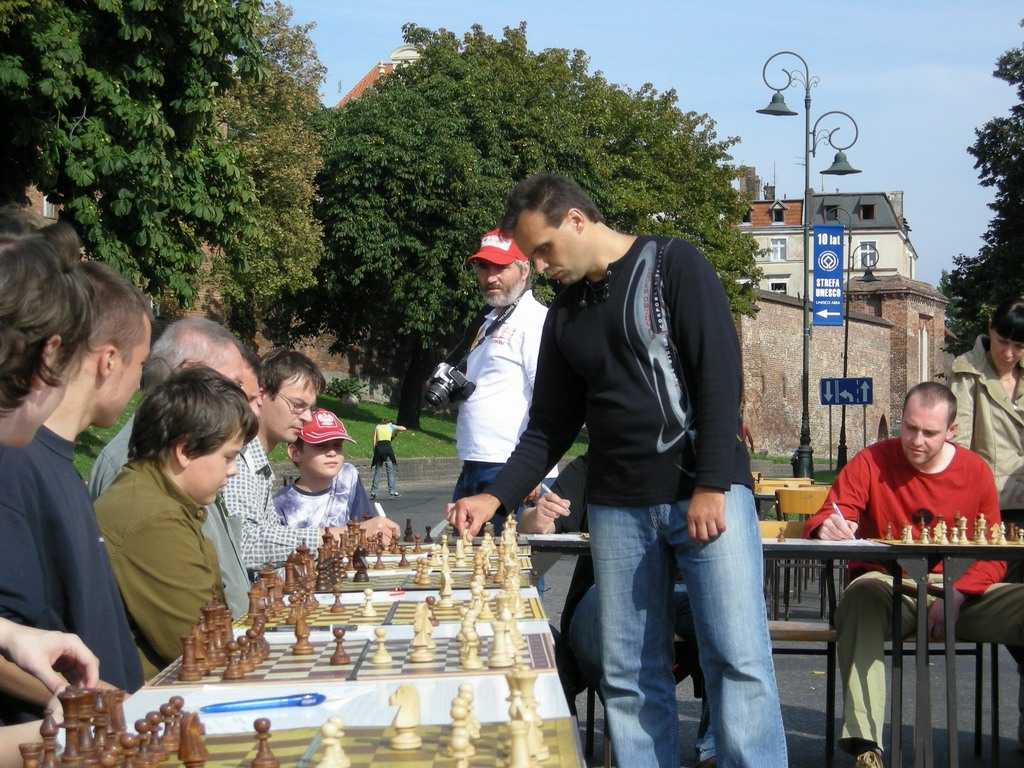
A simultaneous exhibition

simul
Short for simultaneous exhibition.
simultaneous chess
A form of chess in which one player plays against several players simultaneously. It is usually an exhibition.
sitzfleisch
[from German, 'sitting flesh'] The ability to sit still.
skewer
An attack on a valuable piece, compelling it to move to avoid capture and thus expose a less valuable piece which can then be taken.
See also X-ray.
skittles
A casual or "pickup" game, usually played without a chess clock. At chess tournaments, a skittles room is where one goes to play for fun while waiting for the next formal game.
slow
Describes a strategy that requires too many tempi to complete, allowing the opponent time to consolidate.
smothered mate
A checkmate delivered by a knight in which the mated king is unable to escape because it is surrounded (or "smothered") by its own pieces.
Sofia rules
In the tournament played by Sofia rules, players are not allowed to draw by agreement. They could have draws by stalemate, threefold repetition, fifty-move rule, or insufficient material. Other draws are allowed only if the arbiter declares the game reached a drawn position.
solid
An adjective used to describe a move, opening, or manner of play that is characterized by minimal risk-taking and emphasis on quiet positional play rather than wild tactics.
sortie
A queen development in front of its own pawns, often early in the opening, usually for the purpose of exploiting an advantage in space or punishing an error by the opponent. So called because the queen is usually developed behind its own pawns for its protection.
sound
A correct move or plan. A sound sacrifice has sufficient compensation, a sound opening or variation has no known refutation, and a sound puzzle or composition has no known cooks.
Antonym: unsound.
space
The squares controlled by each player. A player controlling more squares than the other is said to have a spatial advantage.

Position: a8 black rook, c8 black bishop, d8 black queen, e8 black king, f8 black bishop, g8 black knight, h8 black rook, a7 black pawn, b7 black pawn, c7 black pawn, d7 black pawn, f7 black pawn, g7 black pawn, h7 black pawn, c6 black knight, b5 white bishop, e5 black pawn, e4 white pawn, f3 white knight, a2 white pawn, b2 white pawn, c2 white pawn, d2 white pawn, f2 white pawn, g2 white pawn, h2 white pawn, a1 white rook, b1 white knight, c1 white bishop, d1 white queen, e1 white king, h1 white rook

The Spanish bishop on b5 in the Ruy Lopez

Spanish bishop
A white king bishop developed to b5. This is characteristic of the Ruy Lopez, also known as the Spanish Opening.
speed chess
See blitz chess.
spite check
A harmless check given by a player who is about to lose the game, that serves no purpose other than to momentarily delay the defeat.
squeeze
Making pawn moves that limit mobility, freedom and options for the opponent, typically causing a zugzwang.
staircase maneuver
A tactic by which a queen, rook, or king progresses along a diagonal by making a series of lateral steps using a series of checks or alternating with pins and checks. Also called staircase movement.
stalemate
A position in which the player whose turn it is to move has no legal move and their king is not in check. A stalemate results in an immediate draw.
standard notation
See algebraic notation.
starting square
A piece's starting square is the square it occupies at the beginning of the game.

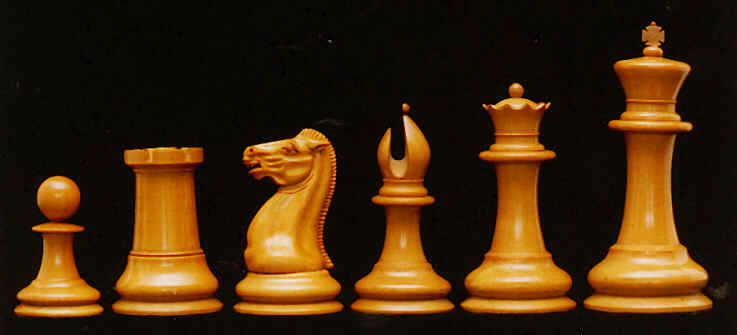
An example of Staunton chessmen

Staunton chess set
The standard design of chess pieces, required for use in competition.
stem game
A stem game is the chess game featuring the first use of a particular opening variation. Sometimes, the player or the venue of the stem game is then used to refer to that opening.
strategic crush
Win characterized by gradual accumulation of advantages and complete prevention of counterplay.
strategy
The basis of a player's moves. The evaluation of positions and ways to achieve goals. Strategy is often contrasted with tactics, which are the calculations of more immediate plans and combinations.
strong
An effective and well-placed piece or pawn; a potential outpost; a forceful or good move; a position having good winning chances; a highly rated player or one successful in tournaments; or a tournament having a sizable number of strong players competing, such as grandmasters. A "strong showing" refers to a player's high win ratio in a tournament.
Antonym: weak
stronger side
The side with a material or positional advantage.
strongpoint
1. A "strongpoint defense" means an opening that defends and retains a central pawn (White: e4 or d4; Black: e5 or d5), as opposed to exchanging the pawn and relinquishing occupation of that central square.
2. More generically, a strongpoint can be any square heavily defended.
strong square
A square on a player's 4th or greater rank on which the player can post a piece that cannot or will not be driven away by enemy pawns.
cf. weak square.
sudden death
The most straightforward time control for a chess game: each player has a fixed amount of time available to make all moves.
See also fast chess.
support point
A square that cannot be attacked by a pawn, and that can be occupied as a home base for a piece, usually a knight.
swap
See exchange.
swindle
A ruse or trick played from a position that is inferior.
Swiss tournament
A system used in tournaments to determine pairings. In every round each player is paired with an opponent with the same or similar score.
See also round-robin tournament.

Position: e8 black rook, g8 black king, a7 black pawn, b7 black pawn, c7 black queen, d7 black knight, f7 black pawn, g7 black pawn, c6 black pawn, f6 black knight, g6 black pawn, d5 black pawn, d4 white pawn, c3 white pawn, f3 white knight, g3 white pawn, a2 white pawn, b2 white pawn, c2 white queen, d2 white knight, f2 white pawn, g2 white pawn, e1 white rook, g1 white king

Example of symmetry: 1.e4 e6 2.d4 d5 3.exd5 exd5 4.Bd3 Bd6 5.Nf3 Nf6 6.0-0 0-0 7.Bg5 Bg4 8.Re1 Nbd7 9.Nbd2 c6 10.c3 Qc7 11.Qc2 Rfe8 12.Bh4 Bh5 13.Bg3 Bxg3 14.hxg3 Bg6 15.Rxe8+ Rxe8 16.Bxg6 hxg6 17.Re1 (see diagram). The game continued 17...Rxe1+ 18.Nxe1 Ne8 19.Nd3 Nd6 20.Qb3 a6 21.Kf1 ½–½
Capablanca vs. Maróczy, 1926.

symmetry
A symmetrical position on the chessboard means the positions of one's pieces are exactly mirrored by the opponent's pieces. This most often occurs when Black mimics White's opening moves. Black is said to break symmetry when making a move that no longer imitates White's move.
system
See opening system.

== T ==
tabia
[from Arabic: طبيعة ṭabīʕa 'essence'] Also tabiya. In chess openings a tabia is a key point. It may be a well-known "point of departure" where variations branch off, it may be a position that is reached so often that the real game begins after this initial series of book moves.
tablebase
See endgame tablebase.
tactician
A player who specializes in tactical play, as distinguished from a positional player.
tactics
Combinations, traps, and threats. Play characterized by short-term attacks, requiring calculation by the players, as distinguished from positional play.
takeback
Used in casual games whereby both players agree to undo one or more moves.
tall pawn
[colloq.] An ineffective bishop, usually a bad bishop hemmed in by its own pawns.
Tarrasch rule
The general principle that rooks usually should be placed behind passed pawns, either one's own or one's opponent's. Named after Siegbert Tarrasch.
TC
Abbr. for time control.
TD
Abbr. for tournament director.
technique
The manner in which a player converts an advantageous position into a win.
tempo
A unit of time considered as one move. A player may gain a tempo in the opening when the opponent moves the same piece twice. In the endgame, one may wish to lose a tempo by triangulation in order to gain the opposition. pl. tempos or tempi.

Position: a8 black rook, c8 black bishop, d8 black queen, e8 black king, f8 black bishop, h8 black rook, a7 black pawn, b7 black pawn, c7 black pawn, d7 black pawn, f7 black pawn, g7 black pawn, h7 black pawn, c6 black knight, f6 black knight, d4 white knight, e4 white pawn, c3 white knight, a2 white pawn, b2 white pawn, c2 white pawn, f2 white pawn, g2 white pawn, h2 white pawn, a1 white rook, c1 white bishop, d1 white queen, e1 white king, f1 white bishop, h1 white rook

This Scotch Opening position contains tension due to the knights on c6 and d4. Both knights are currently adequately defended, so neither player is forced to release the tension.

tension
A position in which one or more exchanges are possible, such as a pair of pawns facing each other on a diagonal where either can capture the other, is said to contain tension. Such a situation differs from a threat in that it does not need to be immediately resolved – for example, if both pawns are defended. The consequences of resolving the tension must be constantly considered by both players, in case there is a possibility of winning or losing material. This makes calculating the best move more complicated, and so there is a natural temptation to "release the tension" by making a like-for-like exchange (see simplification) or by moving the attacked piece. To "keep the tension" is to avoid resolving it, which can be good advice depending on the position.
text move
This term is used in written analysis of chess games to refer to a move actually played in the game as opposed to other possible moves. Often shortened to text, for example "The text is inferior as it allows ...f5." Text moves are usually in bold whereas analysis moves are not.
thematic
Suited to the demands of the position. The term "thematic move" is often applied to the key move of a thematic plan.
theme tournament
A chess tournament in which every game must begin with a particular opening specified by the organizers, for example the Budapest Gambit (1.d4 Nf6 2.c4 e5).
theoretical draw
See book draw.
theoretical novelty ("TN" or "N")
Or simply novelty. A move in the opening that has not been played before.
theory
See book move.
threat
A plan or move that carries an intention to damage the opponent's position. A threat is a tactical weapon that must be defended against.
threefold repetition
A draw may be claimed if the same position occurs three times with the same player to move and with each player having the choice of the same set of moves each time, including the right to capture en passant and the right to castle. For the same position occurring five times, see fivefold repetition.
tiebreaks
See Tie-breaking in Swiss-system tournaments. This refers to a number of different systems that are used to break ties, and thus designate a single winner, where multiple players or teams tie for the same place in a Swiss system chess tournament.
time
1. The amount of time each player has to think and calculate as measured by a chess clock.
2. The number of moves to complete an objective; for example, if a king is racing to stop a pawn from queening, and the king has too few moves, that may be referred to as "not enough time".
See also tempo.
time control
The allowed time to play a game, usually measured by a chess clock. A time control can require either a certain number of moves be made per time period (e.g. 40 moves in 2 1/2 hours) or it can limit the length of the entire game (e.g. five minutes per game for blitz). Hybrid schemes are used, and time delay controls have become popular since the widespread use of digital clocks.
time delay
A time control that makes it possible for a player to avoid having an ever-decreasing amount of time remaining (as is the case with sudden death). The most important time delays in chess are Bronstein delay and Fischer delay.
time pressure
Or time trouble. Having very little time on one's clock (especially less than five minutes) to complete one's remaining moves. Also called zeitnot.
See also time control.
TN
Abbr. for theoretical novelty.
top board
See first board.
touch-move rule
Or touched piece rule. The rule that requires a player who touches a piece to move that piece unless the piece has no legal moves. If a player moves a piece to a particular square and takes their hand off it, the move must be to that square if it is a legal move. Castling must be initiated by moving the king first, so a player who touches their rook may be required to move the rook, without castling. The rule also requires a player who touches an opponent's piece to capture it if possible. In order to adjust the position of a piece within its square without being required to move it, the player should say "J'adoube" or "I adjust".

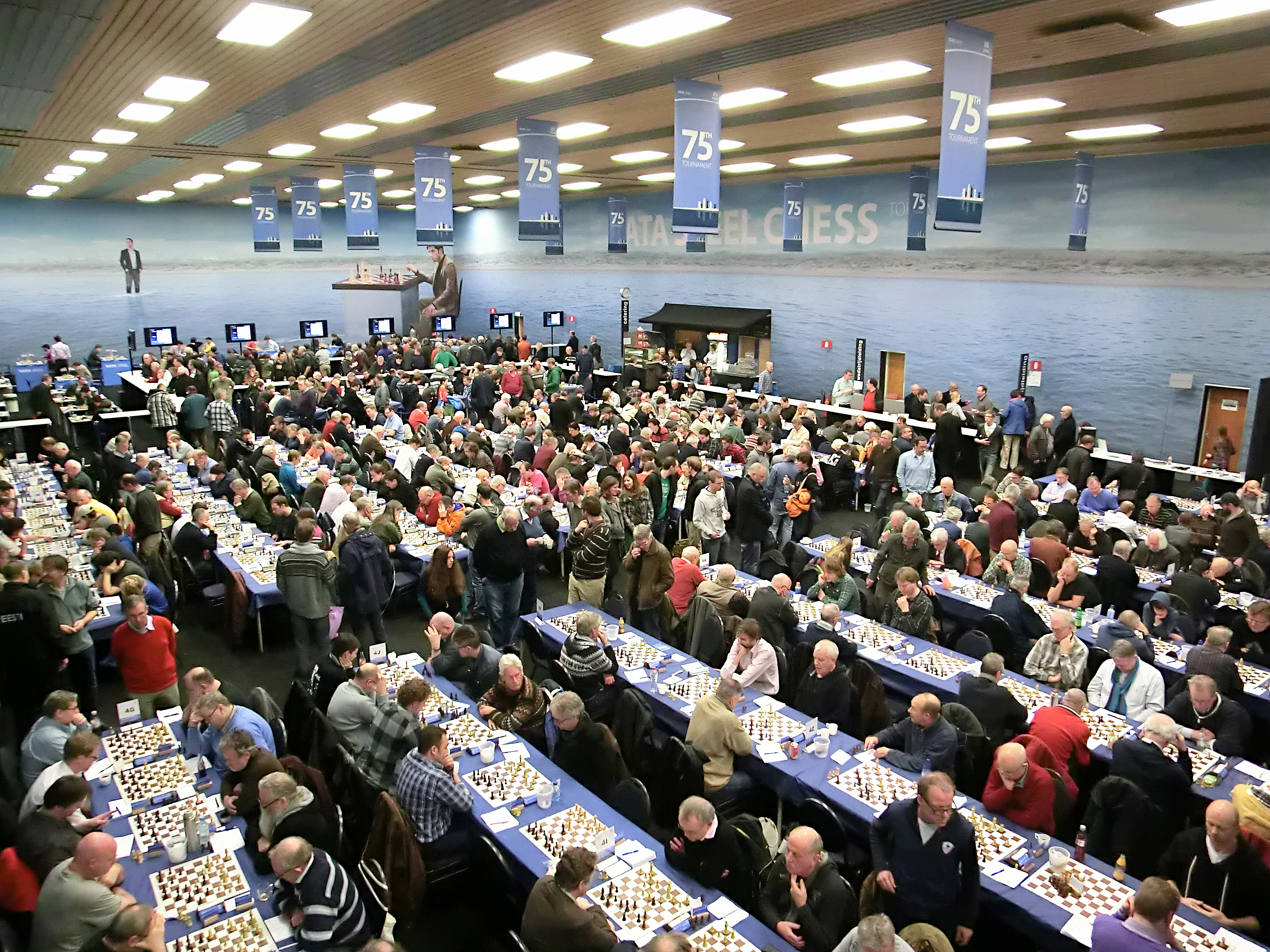
Tata Steel Tournament 2013

tournament
A competition involving more than two players or teams, generally played at a single venue (or series of venues) in a relatively short period of time. A tournament is divided into rounds, with each round consisting either of individual games or matches in the case of knockout tournaments and team tournaments. The assignment of opponents is called pairing, with the most popular systems being round-robin and Swiss. A tournament is usually referred to by the city in which it was played and the year, such as "London 1851", although there are well-known exceptions, such as "AVRO 1938".
tournament book
A book recording the scores of all the games in a tournament, usually with analysis of the best or most important games and some background on the event and its participants. One well-known example is Bronstein's Zurich International Chess Tournament 1953. The less comprehensive tournament bulletin is usually issued between the rounds of a prestigious event, giving the players and world media an instant record of the games of the previous round. Individual copies may be bundled together at the conclusion of the event to provide an inexpensive alternative to the tournament book.
tournament director ("TD")
Also tournament controller [chiefly British]. Organizer and arbiter of a tournament, responsible for enforcing the tournament rules and the laws of chess.
tournament performance rating ("TPR")
The performance rating over the course of a tournament.
TPR
Abbr. for tournament performance rating.
trade
See exchange.
transposition
Arriving at a position using a different sequence of moves than usual.

Position: a8 black rook, c8 black bishop, d8 black queen, e8 black king, f8 black bishop, h8 black rook, a7 black pawn, b7 black pawn, c7 black pawn, d7 black knight, f7 black pawn, g7 black pawn, h7 black pawn, e6 black pawn, f6 black knight, d5 black pawn, g5 white bishop, c4 white pawn, d4 white pawn, c3 white knight, a2 white pawn, b2 white pawn, e2 white pawn, f2 white pawn, g2 white pawn, h2 white pawn, a1 white rook, d1 white queen, e1 white king, f1 white bishop, g1 white knight, h1 white rook

With 4...Nbd7 Black sets a trap in the QGD (1.d4 d5 2.c4 e6 3.Nc3 Nf6 4.Bg5). White cannot win the pawn on d5 due to the Elephant Trap.

trap
A move that may tempt the opponent to play a losing move.
See also swindle and List of chess traps.
trapped piece
A piece is said to be "trapped" when it is en prise and cannot escape its capture in any way (i.e by capturing a piece, moving the piece, or blocking the attacking piece). Any piece—including the queen—can become "trapped" if a player is careless. A trapped king is said to be checkmated.

Position: e5 black pawn, f5 white king, d4 black king, e4 white pawn

Trébuchet: whoever has the move loses. 1.Kg4 Kxe4 2.Kg3 Ke3 3.Kg2 Ke2 4.Kg3 e4 5.Kf4 e3 6.Ke4 Kf2 and the black pawn will queen.

trébuchet
[from French, a type of siege engine] A theoretical position of mutual zugzwang in which either player would lose if it were their turn to move.
triangulation
A technique of moving a king along the vertices of a triangle to renter the same position but inverting the player to move, often used in king and pawn endgames (less commonly seen with other pieces) to lose a tempo and gain the opposition.
tripled pawns
Three pawns of the same color on the same file; considered a weakness due to their inability to defend each other.
Troitsky line
Also Troitzky line. Endgame analysis by Alexey Troitsky of two knights versus a pawn found certain pawn positions that result in win, draw or loss. The resulting pawn positions on each file form what is known as the Troitsky line or Troitsky position.
two bishops
Or the two bishops. A synonym for bishop pair.

== U ==
unclear
A position where it is unclear who (if anyone) has an advantage.
undermining
A tactic (also known as "removal of the guard") in which a defensive piece is captured, leaving one of the opponent's pieces undefended or underdefended.

Position: c7 white pawn, d7 white king, a5 black king, a4 black pawn, a3 white pawn, b1 white rook

White to move should underpromote the c7-pawn to a rook; promoting to a queen gives stalemate.

underpromotion
Promoting a pawn to a rook, bishop, or knight instead of a queen. Rarely seen unless the knight can deliver a crucial check, or when promotion to a rook or a bishop instead of a queen is necessary to avoid stalemate.
United States Chess Federation ("USCF")
This is a nonprofit organization, the governing chess organization within the United States, and one of the federations of the FIDE.
unorthodox opening
See irregular opening.
unpinning
The act of breaking a pin by interposing a second piece between the attacker and the target. This allows the piece that was formerly pinned to move.
unsound
Antonym of sound.
USCF
Abbr. for United States Chess Federation.

== V ==
vacating sacrifice
A sacrifice made for the purpose of clearing a square for a different piece of the same color.
valve
A move that opens one line and closes another.
vanished center
Or vanished centre. A position with no white or black center pawns.
variant
See chess variant.
variation
1. A sequence of moves or an alternative line of play, often applied to the opening. A variation does not have to have been played in a game; it may also be a possibility that occurs only in analysis. Also called continuation.
2. The word "Variation" is also used to name specific sequences of moves within an opening. For an example, the Dragon Variation is part of the Sicilian Defense.
vertical line
See file.

== W ==
waiting move
A move whose sole purpose is to oblige the opponent to move. A waiting move is effective when the opponent has nothing but bad moves available (i.e. is in zugzwang).
WCC
Abbr. for World Chess Championship.
WCM
Abbr. for Woman Candidate Master.
weakness
A pawn or square that can be attacked and is hard to defend.
weak square
A square that cannot be easily defended from attack by an opponent. Often a weak square is unable to be defended by pawns (a hole) and can be theoretically occupied by a piece. Exchange or loss of a bishop may make all squares of that bishop's color weak resulting in a "weak square complex" on the light squares or the dark squares.
WFM
Abbr. for Woman FIDE Master.
WGM
Abbr. for Woman Grandmaster.
white
The light-colored squares on the chessboard are often referred to as "the white squares" even though they often are some other light color. Similarly, "the white pieces" are sometimes actually some other (usually light) color.
See also black.
White
The designation for the player who moves first, even though the corresponding pieces, referred to as "the white pieces", are sometimes actually some other (usually light) color.
See also Black and First-move advantage in chess.
WIM
Abbr. for Woman International Master.
win
A victory for one of the two players in a game, which may occur due to checkmate, resignation by the other player, the other player exceeding the time control, or the other player being forfeited by the tournament director. Chess being a zero-sum game, this results in a loss for the other player. In a tournament a bye may be scored as a win.
See also winning position.
windmill
A combination in which two pieces work together to deliver an alternating series of checks and discovered checks in such a way that the opposing king is required to move on each turn. It is a potent technique, since, on every other move, the discovered check may allow the non-checking piece to capture an enemy piece without losing a tempo. The most famous example is Torre–Lasker, Moscow 1925. Also called seesaw.
wing
The queenside a-, b-, and c-files; or the kingside f-, g-, and h-files. Also called flank.

Position: a8 black rook, b8 black knight, c8 black bishop, d8 black queen, e8 black king, f8 black bishop, g8 black knight, h8 black rook, a7 black pawn, b7 black pawn, d7 black pawn, e7 black pawn, f7 black pawn, g7 black pawn, h7 black pawn, c5 black pawn, b4 white pawn, e4 white pawn, a2 white pawn, c2 white pawn, d2 white pawn, f2 white pawn, g2 white pawn, h2 white pawn, a1 white rook, b1 white knight, c1 white bishop, d1 white queen, e1 white king, f1 white bishop, g1 white knight, h1 white rook

Wing Gambit in the Sicilian Defense

Wing Gambit
The name given to variations of several openings in which one player gambits a wing pawn, usually the b-pawn.
winning percentage
A number calculated by adding together the number of games won and half of the number of games drawn (i.e. ignoring the losses), then dividing that total by the total number of games that were played.
Another way of calculating the winning percentage is by taking the percentage of games won by a player plus half the percentage of drawn games. Thus, if out of 100 games a player wins 40 percent, draws 32 percent, and loses 28 percent, the winning percentage is 40 plus half of 32, i.e. 56 percent.
winning position
A position is said to be a winning one if one specified side, with correct play, can eventually force a checkmate against any defense (i.e. perfect defense). Also called won game.
Woman Candidate Master ("WCM")
A women-only chess title ranking below Woman FIDE Master.
Woman FIDE Master ("WFM")
A women-only chess title ranking below Woman International Master.
Woman Grandmaster ("WGM")
The highest ranking gender-restricted chess title except for Women's World Champion.
Woman International Master ("WIM")
A women-only chess title ranking below Woman Grandmaster and above Woman FIDE Master.
won game
See winning position.
wood
[slang] Pieces. "A lot of wood came off the board" conveys that several piece exchanges occurred.
woodpusher
[colloq., typically derogatory] A weak chess player, also referred to as a patzer or duffer.
See also fish.
World Champion
A winner of the World Chess Championship.
wrong bishop
Or wrong-colored bishop. A bishop that, because of the color squares it is restricted to, suffers critical loss of utility in the game position.
See also wrong rook pawn.
wrong rook pawn
With a bishop, a rook pawn may be the wrong rook pawn, depending on whether or not the bishop controls its promotion square.

Position: b8 black king, a6 white king, a5 white pawn, d4 white bishop

A wrong rook pawn at a5 with a wrong-colored bishop. In this position, White cannot force promotion and Black can force a draw.

== X ==
Position: d8 white queen, g8 black king, f7 black pawn, g7 black pawn, h7 black pawn, d5 black rook, a2 black queen, f2 white pawn, g2 white pawn, h2 white pawn, d1 white rook, f1 white king

Example of X-ray: The white queen has just put the king in check, and the white rook provides an X-ray defense of the white queen.

X-ray
When the power of a piece, either to attack or to defend, seems to pass through an intervening enemy piece. An X-ray attack, also known as a skewer, occurs when two pieces of the same color are caught in the same line of attack along a diagonal, rank, or file. The attacking piece forces the first and more valuable piece to move out of the way, which allows the second piece to be captured. An X-ray defense occurs when one piece is defended by another piece through an attacking enemy piece standing between the two.

== Z ==
zeitnot
[from German, 'time need'] Having very little time on the clock to complete the remaining moves of a timed game. Also called time pressure and time trouble.
See also time control.
Zonal tournaments
Tournaments organized by FIDE, the first qualifying cycle of the World Chess Championship. Each zonal tournament features top players of a certain geographical zone. Up until 1993 the winners went on to Interzonal tournaments. This was replaced by a system where the winners now play each other in knockout-style competitions to determine who goes on to the Candidates Tournament.
zugzwang
[from German, 'compulsion to move'] When a player is put at a disadvantage by having to make a move; where any legal move weakens the position. Zugzwang usually occurs in the endgame, and rarely in the middlegame.
zwischenschach
[from German, 'in-between check'] Playing a surprising check that the opponent did not consider when plotting a sequence of moves; a zwischenzug that is a check.
zwischenzug
[from German, 'in-between move'] An "in-between" move, or an intermezzo, played before an expected reply. Often, but not always, this involves responding to a threat by posing an even greater threat, forcing the opponent to respond to the threat first.

== See also ==
- Chess equipment
