= King walk =

Chess terminology

Short vs. Timman, final position

Position: c8 black bishop, e8 black rook, f8 black rook, g8 black king, c7 black pawn, d7 white rook, f7 black pawn, b6 black pawn, c6 black queen, e6 black pawn, f6 white queen, g6 black pawn, h6 white circle, a5 black pawn, e5 white pawn, g5 white king, h5 black pawn, a4 white pawn, c4 white pawn, d4 white rook, f4 white circle, h4 white pawn, f3 white knight, g3 white circle, c2 white pawn, f2 white pawn, g2 white pawn, h2 white circle, g1 white circle

Position after 34.Kg5. Short had marched his castled king up the board (see white circles), and now 35.Kh6 (if 34...Kh7, then 35.Qxg6+ Kh8 36.Qh6+ Kg8 37.Kf6) followed by Qg7# cannot be stopped.

In chess, a king walk, also known as a king march, steel king, or wandering king (Dutch: wandelkoning, literally "wanderking"), is a maneuver where the king travels a large distance to a different part of the board in the middlegame or opening. During a king walk, the king may travel along its own side of the board (from kingside to queenside, or vice versa) to reach a safer position. Alternatively, it may travel up the board, often involved in a mating attack against the opposing king.

Activating the king before the endgame is a highly unusual occurrence; before the endgame, the safety of the king is considered paramount, and players are recommended to keep it out of harm's way. In contrast, Wilhelm Steinitz, often known as the father of modern chess, was renowned for his maxim that "the king is a fighting piece". Dutch chess historian and author Tim Krabbé has documented over one hundred such games.

Because of the rarity of such tactics, those that reap rewards for the attacking player often have brilliancy prizes bestowed upon them. Perhaps the most famous in recent history, where Nigel Short defeated Jan Timman in Tilburg in 1991, was voted as one of the hundred greatest chess games in a list compiled by master Graham Burgess, and grandmasters John Nunn and John Emms.

== Example games ==
- Short vs. Timman, Tilburg 1991. Alekhine Defense: Modern, Alburt Variation (B04), 1–0. Short ties up Timman's pieces and his king can advance.
- Alekhine vs. Yates, London 1922. Queen's Gambit Declined: Orthodox Defense, Main Line (D64), 1–0. Alekhine conjures up an attack in the endgame, and his king joins the fray.

== See also ==
- Chess tactics
- King hunt – where the king is involuntarily chased up the board by the opponent and often checkmated
