= King hunt =

Chess terminology

In chess, a king hunt is a tactical motif in which the opponent's king is exposed and subjected to a series of checks. Sometimes the king is drawn across the board and is mated in enemy territory. It is critical in such situations that the entire sequence is forced and the opponent is not given an opportunity to organize a defense.

== Examples ==
One of the most famous king hunts occurred in Lasker–Thomas, 1912. In the position in the diagram, Lasker played 1.Qxh7+; the entire sequence is forced and the final move 8.Kd2 delivers mate. Lasker could also have mated by castling queenside (8.0-0-0#).

Position: a8 black rook, b8 black knight, f8 black rook, g8 black king, a7 black pawn, b7 black bishop, c7 black pawn, d7 black pawn, e7 black queen, g7 black pawn, h7 black pawn, b6 black pawn, e6 black pawn, f6 black bishop, e5 white knight, h5 white queen, d4 white pawn, e4 white knight, d3 white bishop, a2 white pawn, b2 white pawn, c2 white pawn, f2 white pawn, g2 white pawn, h2 white pawn, a1 white rook, e1 white king, h1 white rook

1.Qxh7+ Kxh7 2.Nxf6+ Kh6 3.Neg4+ Kg5 4.h4+ Kf4 5.g3+ Kf3 6.Be2+ Kg2 7.Rh2+ Kg1 8.Kd2#

Position: a8 black rook, b8 black knight, f8 black rook, a7 black pawn, b7 black bishop, c7 black pawn, d7 black pawn, e7 black queen, g7 black pawn, b6 black pawn, e6 black pawn, f6 white knight, d4 white pawn, g4 white knight, h4 white pawn, g3 white pawn, a2 white pawn, b2 white pawn, c2 white pawn, d2 white king, e2 white bishop, f2 white pawn, h2 white rook, a1 white rook, g1 black king

Final position after 8.Kd2#

When two unevenly matched players are paired against each other, it is possible for the stronger player to force the opponent's king to be checkmated on an arbitrary square of their choosing, using king hunting techniques. An instructional position is shown below, where the stronger player has the White pieces and checkmates the lone Black king on the second rank, with all of White's first rank pieces returned to their starting positions.

Position: g4 white queen, b3 black king, a1 white rook, b1 white knight, c1 white bishop, e1 white king, f1 white bishop, g1 white knight, h1 white rook

Position after 1.Ra1. Black's only legal move is 1...Kc2.

Position: c2 black king, a1 white rook, b1 white knight, c1 white bishop, d1 white queen, e1 white king, f1 white bishop, g1 white knight, h1 white rook

Final position after 2.Qd1#

== See also ==
- Chess tactic
- King walk – voluntary king advances or lateral journeys
