= Clearance sacrifice =

Chess tactic

Example of clearance sacrifice

Position: a8 black rook, c8 black rook, h8 black king, c7 black knight, f7 white rook, g7 black bishop, h7 black pawn, e6 white queen, g6 black pawn, a5 black pawn, g5 white knight, a4 white pawn, b4 black pawn, c4 white bishop, b3 white pawn, g2 white pawn, h2 white pawn, d1 white rook, h1 white king

1.Rf8+ Rxf8 2.Qg8+ Rxg8 3.Nf7#

In chess, a clearance sacrifice is a tactical motif which involves a square on the chessboard being vacated to open up lines of attack. The tactic may also result in the substitution of a piece hindering the attack by a piece useful to the attack.

== Example ==
In the diagram, the clearance sacrifice 1.Rf8+ vacates the f7-square and, after 1...Rxf8 (better than 1...Bxf8 2.Qg8#), White utilizes the battery on the a2–g8 diagonal. After 2.Qg8+ Rxg8 (only move), White has a classic smothered mate with 3.Nf7#, utilizing the f7-square vacated by the clearance sacrifice.
