= Fool's mate =

Fastest checkmate in the game of chess

Position: a8 black rook, b8 black knight, c8 black bishop, e8 black king, f8 black bishop, g8 black knight, h8 black rook, a7 black pawn, b7 black pawn, c7 black pawn, d7 black pawn, f7 black pawn, g7 black pawn, h7 black pawn, e6 black pawn, g4 white pawn, h4 black queen, f3 white pawn, a2 white pawn, b2 white pawn, c2 white pawn, d2 white pawn, e2 white pawn, h2 white pawn, a1 white rook, b1 white knight, c1 white bishop, d1 white queen, e1 white king, f1 white bishop, g1 white knight, h1 white rook
Fool's mate: White is checkmated.
- Moves: 1.f3 e6 2.g4 Qh4#
- Origin: Gioachino Greco (c. 1620), via Francis Beale (1656)
- Parent: Barnes Opening, Bird Opening, or Grob's Attack

The fool's mate is the fastest checkmate in chess delivered after the fewest possible moves from the game's starting position. It arises from the following moves (minor variations are possible):

1. f3 e6
2. g4?? Qh4#

The mate can be achieved in two moves only by Black, giving checkmate on the second move with the queen. Fool's mate received its name because it can occur only if White commits an extraordinary blunder. Black can be mated in an analogous way, though this requires an additional move, with White's queen delivering checkmate on the third move. Even among rank beginners, this checkmate rarely occurs in practice.

The mate is an illustration of the kingside weakness shared by both players along the f- and g-files during the opening phase of the game. A player may also suffer an early checkmate if the f- and g-pawns are advanced prematurely and the kingside is not properly defended, as shown in historical miniature games recorded in chess literature.

== History ==
Fool's mate was named and described in The Royal Game of Chess-Play, a 1656 text by Francis Beale that adapted the work of the early chess writer Gioachino Greco.

Prior to the mid-19th century, there was not a prevailing convention as to whether White or Black moved first; according to Beale, the matter was to be decided in some prior contest or decision of the players' choice. In Beale's example, Black was the player to move first, with each player making two moves to various squares or "houses", after which White achieved checkmate.

The Fooles Mate.

Black Kings Biſhops pawne one houſe.
White Kings pawne one houſe.
Black kings knights pawne two houſes
White Queen gives Mate at the contrary kings Rookes fourth houſe.

— Beale, The Royall Game of Chesse-Play

Beale's example can be paraphrased in modern terms where White always moves first, algebraic notation is used, and Black delivers the fastest possible mate after each player makes two moves: 1.f3 e6 2.g4 Qh4#

== Move sequence possibilities ==
There are eight distinct ways in which fool's mate can be reached. White may alternate the order of f- and g-pawn moves, Black may move their e-pawn to e6 or e5, and White may move their f-pawn to f3 or f4.

== Variations ==
Mating patterns similar to fool's mate can occur early in the game. Such patterns in historical games illustrate the weakness along the e1–h4 and e8–h5 diagonals early in the game. White can mate Black using a pattern that resembles fool's mate, though it takes at least an extra turn.

=== White to mate in three moves ===
Position: a8 black rook, b8 black knight, c8 black bishop, d8 black queen, e8 black king, f8 black bishop, g8 black knight, h8 black rook, a7 black pawn, b7 black pawn, c7 black pawn, d7 black pawn, e7 black pawn, h7 black pawn, f6 black pawn, g5 black pawn, d4 white pawn, e4 white pawn, a2 white pawn, b2 white pawn, c2 white pawn, f2 white pawn, g2 white pawn, h2 white pawn, a1 white rook, b1 white knight, c1 white bishop, d1 white queen, e1 white king, f1 white bishop, g1 white knight, h1 white rook

A problem with White to mate instead, given by Fischer and Polgár.

White can achieve a checkmate similar to fool's mate. When the roles are reversed, however, White requires an extra third turn or half-move, known in computer chess as a ply. In both cases, the principle is the same: a player advances their f- and g-pawns such that the opponent's queen can mate along the unblocked diagonal. A board position illustrating White's version of fool's mate—with White to mate—was given as a problem in Bobby Fischer Teaches Chess, and also as an early example in a compendium of problems by László Polgár. The solution in Fischer's book bore the comment "Black foolishly weakened his King's defenses. This game took three moves!!" One possible sequence leading to the position is 1. e4 g5 2. d4 f6?? 3. Qh5#.

A possibly apocryphal variant of the fool's mate has been reported by several sources. The 1959 game 1. e4 g5 2. Nc3 f5?? 3. Qh5# has been attributed to Masefield and Trinka, although the first player's name has also been reported as Mayfield or Mansfield and the second player's name as Trinks or Trent. Further, a similar mate can occur in From's Gambit: 1. f4 e5 2. g3? exf4 3. gxf4?? Qh4#.

There are other possible three-move mates for White, such as 1. e4 e5 2. Qh5 Ke7?? 3. Qxe5#. The total number is 347.

Even if White has a handicap of queen odds, there is a possible three-move mate for White, such as 1. e4 f6 2. Be2 g5?? 3. Bh5#.

=== Black to mate in three moves ===
If the typical fool's mate setup is played, except White plays h3 instead of g4, a similar forced mate can result: 2... Qh4+ 3. g3 Qxg3#. Like fool's mate, there are eight distinct ways for this to happen.

=== Teed vs. Delmar ===
Teed vs. Delmar, 1896

Position: a8 black rook, b8 black knight, c8 black bishop, d8 black queen, e8 black king, f8 black bishop, g8 black knight, a7 black pawn, b7 black pawn, c7 black pawn, d7 black pawn, e7 black pawn, h6 black rook, g5 black pawn, h5 black pawn, d4 white pawn, f4 black pawn, d3 white bishop, e3 white pawn, g3 white bishop, a2 white pawn, b2 white pawn, c2 white pawn, f2 white pawn, g2 white pawn, h2 white pawn, a1 white rook, b1 white knight, d1 white queen, e1 white king, g1 white knight, h1 white rook

After 6...Rh6?? White mates in two moves.

A well-known trap in the Dutch Defense occurred in the game Frank Melville Teed–Eugene Delmar, 1896:

1. d4 f5 2. Bg5 h6 3. Bh4 g5 4. Bg3 f4

It seems that Black has won the bishop, but now comes ...

5. e3

Threatening Qh5#.

5... h5 6. Bd3?!

Probably better is 6.Be2, but the move played sets a trap.

6... Rh6??

Defending against Bg6#, but ...

7. Qxh5+!

White sacrifices his queen to draw the black rook away from its control of g6.

7... Rxh5 8. Bg6#

=== Greco vs. NN ===
Greco vs. NN, 1625

Position: a8 black rook, b8 black knight, d8 black queen, e8 black king, f8 black bishop, h8 black rook, a7 black pawn, c7 black pawn, d7 black pawn, e7 black pawn, h7 white pawn, b6 black pawn, g6 white bishop, h5 black knight, d4 white pawn, a2 white pawn, b2 white pawn, c2 white pawn, f2 white pawn, g2 black bishop, h2 white pawn, a1 white rook, b1 white knight, c1 white bishop, e1 white king, g1 white knight, h1 white rook

Final position after 8.Bg6#

A similar trap occurred in a game published by Gioachino Greco in 1625:

1. e4 b6
2. d4 Bb7
3. Bd3 f5?
4. exf5 Bxg2?
5. Qh5+ g6
6. fxg6 Nf6??

Opening up a flight square for the king at f8 with 6...Bg7 would have prolonged the game. White still wins with 7.Qf5! Nf6 8.Bh6 Bxh6 9.gxh7 Bxh1 (9...e6 opens another flight square at e7; then White checks with 10.Qg6+ Ke7) 10.Qg6+ Kf8 11.Qxh6+ Kf7 12.Nh3, but much slower than in the game.

7. gxh7+! Nxh5
8. Bg6#

=== Berkes vs. Szaz ===
Berkes vs. Szaz, 1998

Position: a8 black rook, b8 black knight, c8 black bishop, d8 black queen, e8 black king, f8 black bishop, h8 black rook, a7 black pawn, b7 black pawn, c7 black pawn, d7 black pawn, e7 black pawn, h7 black pawn, f6 black pawn, e5 white bishop, g5 black pawn, d4 white pawn, e4 black knight, e3 white pawn, a2 white pawn, b2 white pawn, c2 white pawn, f2 white pawn, g2 white pawn, h2 white pawn, a1 white rook, b1 white knight, d1 white queen, e1 white king, f1 white bishop, g1 white knight, h1 white rook

Position after 5.e3!, where fxe5 is a trap that blunders mate in one.

The main line of the Trompowsky Attack begins

1. d4 Nf6
2. Bg5 Ne4
3. Bf4

In this position the most popular responses from Black are c5 or d5 fighting for the center. But in a few games, like in this Hungarian Open game played in 1998 between a 13-year old Ferenc Berkes and a much older Ferenc Szaz, a similar trap occurs when Black tries to hunt White’s bishop:

3... g5
4. Be5 f6
5. e3 Bg7
6. Qh5+ Kf8
7. Bg3 d5

At this point the main ideas have been seen, Black’s desire to win the bishop needed to be abandoned to create a flight square on f8 with 5...Bg7 since 5.e3 fxe5?? 6.Qh5 is checkmate. White still played the queen check to remove Black's castling privileges, and then rescued the bishop; this opening created long-term weaknesses for Black, whose kingside bishop and rook struggled to get out from behind the pawns on f6 and g5, and this ultimately led to a successful queenside attack by White.

== See also ==
- Checkmate patterns
- Damiano Defense
- List of chess traps
- Scholar's mate
