= Latvian Gambit =

Chess opening

Position: a8 black rook, b8 black knight, c8 black bishop, d8 black queen, e8 black king, f8 black bishop, g8 black knight, h8 black rook, a7 black pawn, b7 black pawn, c7 black pawn, d7 black pawn, g7 black pawn, h7 black pawn, e5 black pawn, f5 black pawn, e4 white pawn, f3 white knight, a2 white pawn, b2 white pawn, c2 white pawn, d2 white pawn, f2 white pawn, g2 white pawn, h2 white pawn, a1 white rook, b1 white knight, c1 white bishop, d1 white queen, e1 white king, f1 white bishop, h1 white rook
- Moves: 1.e4 e5 2.Nf3 f5
- ECO: C40
- Origin: 17th century
- Named after: Latvian players (Kārlis Bētiņš et al.); Gioachino Greco
- Parent: King's Knight Opening
- Synonym: Greco Countergambit

The Latvian Gambit (or Greco Countergambit) is a chess opening characterised by the moves:

1. e4 e5
2. Nf3 f5?!

It is one of the oldest chess openings, having been analysed in the 16th century by Giulio Cesare Polerio and the 17th century by Gioachino Greco, after whom it is sometimes named. The opening has the appearance of a King's Gambit with colours reversed. It is an aggressive but objectively dubious opening for Black which often leads to wild and tricky positions.

The ECO code for the Latvian Gambit is C40, along with several other uncommon responses to 2.Nf3.

== History ==
Analysed by Giulio Cesare Polerio, in the late 16th century, the opening came to be known as the Greco Countergambit, and some writers still refer to it as such. That name recognised the Italian player Gioachino Greco (1600–1634), who contributed to the early theory of the opening.

The name "Latvian Gambit" is a tribute to several Latvian players who analysed it, Kārlis Bētiņš being the most prominent among them. The Austrian master Albert Becker once published an article that Bētiņš judged to be dismissive about the Latvian Gambit. In response, Bētiņš published and analysed one of his own games in order to defend the gambit: Ilyin-Zhenevsky vs. K Bētiņš, 1921.

The opening has a dubious reputation; FIDE Master Dennis Monokroussos even goes so far as to describe it as "possibly the worst opening in chess". Paul van der Sterren writes "What is required to play the Latvian Gambit with any degree of success is a sharp eye for tactics and a mental attitude of total contempt for whatever theory has to say about it." The Latvian has always been uncommon in top-level over-the-board play, but some correspondence players are devotees.

The opening is used mainly for its surprise value, as the chances of an opponent being familiar with this opening are low. It has been used, however, by Boris Spassky and Mikhail Chigorin, amongst many others; albeit, usually in casual play. Most notably, even Bobby Fischer and José Raúl Capablanca have lost to it. Sweden's Jonny Hector is one of the few grandmasters to play it in serious competition; he has argued that it is not as bad as its reputation and that even with best play, White's advantage is not large.

== Main line: 3.Nxe5 Qf6 ==
Position: a8 black rook, b8 black knight, c8 black bishop, e8 black king, f8 black bishop, g8 black knight, h8 black rook, a7 black pawn, b7 black pawn, c7 black pawn, g7 black pawn, h7 black pawn, d6 black pawn, g6 black queen, c4 white knight, d4 white pawn, e4 black pawn, c3 white knight, a2 white pawn, b2 white pawn, c2 white pawn, f2 white pawn, g2 white pawn, h2 white pawn, a1 white rook, c1 white bishop, d1 white queen, e1 white king, f1 white bishop, h1 white rook

Main line, 3.Nxe5 Qf6 4.d4 d6 5.Nc4 fxe4 6.Nc3 Qg6

White's 3.Nxe5 is considered the main line against the Latvian. After the usual 3...Qf6, the traditional main line has been 4.d4 d6 5.Nc4 fxe4, often continuing 6.Nc3 Qg6. The immediate 4.Nc4 (the Leonhardt Variation) has the advantage of preserving the option of d2–d3, and has increased in popularity in recent years.

=== 4.d4 ===
A possible continuation after 4.d4 is 4...d6 5.Nc4 fxe4 6.Nc3 Qg6 7.f3 exf3 8.Qxf3 Nf6 9.Bd3 Qg4 10.Qe3+ Qe6 11.0-0 Qxe3+ 12.Bxe3 Be7 13.Rae1 0-0. White is better here, but Black has chances due to White's misplaced king and weak light squares.

=== 4.Nc4 ===
Position: a8 black rook, b8 black knight, c8 black bishop, e8 black king, f8 black bishop, g8 black knight, h8 black rook, a7 black pawn, b7 black pawn, c7 black pawn, d7 black pawn, g7 black pawn, h7 black pawn, f6 black queen, c4 white knight, e4 black pawn, c3 white knight, a2 white pawn, b2 white pawn, c2 white pawn, d2 white pawn, f2 white pawn, g2 white pawn, h2 white pawn, a1 white rook, c1 white bishop, d1 white queen, e1 white king, f1 white bishop, h1 white rook

Leonhardt Variation, 4.Nc4 fxe4 5.Nc3

4.Nc4 has the advantage of allowing White to open the centre with d3, for example 4...fxe4 5.Nc3 Qg6?! 6.d3 exd3? 7.Bxd3 Qxg2? and now White is winning after 8.Qh5+ Kd8 (or 8...g6 9.Qe5+ and 10.Be4) 9.Be4. If 6... Bb4, however, White must be careful following the same line, e.g. 7.Bd2 exd3 8.Bxd3 Qxg2 9.Qh5+ Kd8 10.Be4 Nf6! because now if White plays Bg5, which would be necessary to win the queen in the earlier line, then ...Bxc3+ wins for Black.

The main line continues 5...Qf7 6.Ne3! Black usually responds with 6...c6!?, when White can either accept the pawn sacrifice with 7.Nxe4 d5 8.Ng5 Qf6 9.Nf3, or decline it with the more popular 7.d3 exd3 8.Bxd3 d5 9.0-0. The latter variation has been deeply analysed; the British grandmaster Anthony Kosten analyses one line to move 32. One line discussed by IM Jeremy Silman is 9...Bc5 10.Na4 Bd6 11.c4 d4 12.Nc2 c5 13.b4 Ne7 14.Nxc5 Bxc5 15.bxc5 Nbc6 16.Bb2 0–0 17.Nxd4 Nxd4 18.Bxd4 Bf5 19.Bxf5 Nxf5 20.Be3 Qxc4 21.Qb3 Nxe3!? 22.fxe3 Rxf1+ 23.Rxf1 Qxb3 24.axb3 Rc8 25.Rf5 and now 25...Rd8 or 25...Rc6 gives Black an excellent chance to draw the pawn-down endgame. Silman later argued that 10.b4!! and now 10...Bxb4 11.Ncxd5 cxd5 12.Nxd5 or 10...Bd6 11.Re1! Ne7 12.Nexd5 cxd5 13.Nb5 is close to winning for White, and that the "old, discredited" 9...Bd6 (rather than 9...Bc5) might be Black's best try, though still insufficient for equality.

== 3.Nxe5, other lines ==
Also possible is the eccentric 3...Nc6?!, against which John Nunn recommends 4.d4, preferring principled opening play to the unclear tactics resulting from 4.Qh5+. After 4.d4, if 4...Qh4? (Kosten's original recommendation) 5.Nf3! Qxe4+ 6.Be2 leaves Black with a lost position. After 4.d4, Kosten analyses 4...Qf6!? 5.Nc3 Bb4 6.exf5! Nxe5 7.Qe2.

Instead of 4.d4, Kosten says that White can accept the proffered rook with 4.Qh5+ g6 5.Nxg6 Nf6 6.Qh3 hxg6 7.Qxh8 Qe7 (7...fxe4? 8.d4! is strong) 8.d3! (Stefan Bücker gives an alternative 8.Nc3! Nb4 9.d3 as also winning for White) 8...fxe4 9.Be3 d5 10.Bc5! Qxc5 11.Qxf6 Bf5 12.dxe4 Nd4 13.exf5! Nxc2+ 14.Kd1 Nxa1 15.Bd3 Qd6 16.Re1+ Kd7 17.Qf7+ Be7 18.Re6 winning.

3...Nf6 is occasionally seen. A common line is 4.exf5 Qe7 5.Qe2 d6 6.Nc4 Bxf5 7.Qxe7+ Bxe7.

== 3.Bc4 ==
Position: a8 black rook, b8 black knight, c8 black bishop, f8 black bishop, g8 black knight, a7 black pawn, b7 black pawn, c7 black pawn, d7 black pawn, e7 black king, f7 white knight, g6 white queen, d4 white pawn, e4 black pawn, c3 white knight, a2 white pawn, b2 white pawn, c2 white pawn, e2 white king, f2 white pawn, h2 white pawn, a1 white rook, c1 black queen

Position after 14.Nc3

White's 3.Bc4 may lead to perhaps the most notorious and heavily analysed line of the Latvian, which begins 3...fxe4 4.Nxe5 Qg5 5.d4 Qxg2 6.Qh5+ g6 7.Bf7+ Kd8 8.Bxg6! Qxh1+ 9.Ke2 Qxc1 (9...c6 is a major alternative) 10.Nf7+ Ke8 11.Nxh8+ hxg6 12.Qxg6+ Kd8 13.Nf7+ Ke7 14.Nc3! (diagram).

Instead of 4...Qg5, however, "nowadays players often give preference to 4...d5", the Svedenborg or Polerio Variation. According to Latvian Gambit experts Kon Grivainis and John Elburg, Black wins more often than White in this line. After 4...d5 5.Qh5+ g6 6.Nxg6, Black chooses between 6...Nf6 and 6...hxg6. 6...Nf6 usually leads, after 7.Qe5+ Be7 8.Bb5+! (a small zwischenzug to deprive Black's knight of the c6-square) 8...c6 9.Nxe7 Qxe7 10.Qxe7+ Kxe7 11.Be2 (or 11.Bf1), to an endgame where Black is a pawn down but has positional compensation. Sharper is 6...hxg6, when 7.Qxh8 Kf7 9.Qd4 Be6 gives White a large material advantage, but his "position is constantly on the edge of a precipice", and the line has accordingly fallen out of favour. More often, White plays 7.Qxg6+ Kd7 8.Bxd5 Nf6, leading to sharp and unclear play.

Black's best response is 3...fxe4. Some sample continuations are

- 4.Nxe5 Qg5 5.Nxf7 Qxg2 6.Rf1 d5 7.Nxh8 (a common mistake is 7.Bxd5? Nc6! 8.Nxh8 Bg4 9.f3 Be7 10.Qe2 Bh4+ 11.Kd1 Qxe2+ 12.Kxe2 Nd4+) 7...Nf6
- 4.Nxe5 Qg5 5.d4 Qxg2 6.Qh5+ g6 7.Bf7+ Kd8 8.Bxg6 Qxh1+ 9.Ke2 Qxc1 10.Nf7+ Ke8 11.Nd6+ Kd8 12.Nf7+ Ke8 13.Nxh8+ hxg6 14.Qxg6+ Kd8 15.Nf7+ Ke7 16.Nc3 Qxc2+ 17.Ke1 d6 18.Nd5+ Kd7 19.Qxg8 e3 20.fxe3 Be7 21.Ng5 Na6
- 4.Bxg8 Rxg8 5.Nxe5 Qg5 6.Ng4 d5 7.h3 Qg6

Assessment: Black is usually down material, but has excellent compensation. Most of White's pieces are still on the back rank. IM Mio argues Black is better.

== Other lines ==
Several other responses for White have been analysed.

=== 3.Nc3 ===
White's 3.Nc3 was originally analysed by the American master Stasch Mlotkowski (1881–1943) in the 1916 British Chess Magazine. Kosten gives as Black's two main responses 3...Nf6 4.Bc4 (4.exf5 is also possible) fxe4 5.Nxe5 d5 6.Nxd5! Nxd5 7.Qh5+ g6 8.Nxg6! hxg6! 9.Qxg6+ Kd7 10.Bxd5 Qe7 11.Qxe4 Rh4 12.Qxe7+ Bxe7, reaching an endgame where White has four pawns for a minor piece, and 4...fxe4 5.Nxe5 Qf6, when White can choose from 6.Nc4! (transposing to the main line 3.Nxe5 Qf6 4.Nc4 fxe4 6.Nc3), 6.d4, and 6.f4!? Black can also play 3...d6, when 4.d4 transposes to the Philidor Countergambit (1.e4 e5 2.Nf3 d6 3.d4 f5!?), which was favoured by Paul Morphy in the mid 19th century and is still seen occasionally today.

Today, however, Black's response is considered to be 3...fxe4.

- 4.Nxe4 d5 5.Nxe5 dxe4 6.Qh5+ g6 7.Nxg6 hxg6 8.Qxh8 Be6 9.Qe5 Kf7 10.Qxe4 Nf6 11.Qxb7 Nbd7
- 4.Nxe4 d5 5.Ng3 e4 6.Nd4 Nf6 7.d3 c5 8.Ndf5 Nc6

Assessment: One of the best lines for Black. Black has better bishops and a strong centre.

=== 3.exf5 ===
White's 3.exf5 followed by 3...e4 4.Ne5 Nf6 5.Be2 is recommended by John L. Watson and Eric Schiller. 4.Qe2, 4.Nd4, and even 4.Ng1!? are also possible.

After 3...e4, White has three possible moves:

- Nd4 (best)
- Ne5
- Qe2

Sample continuation No. 1 (Ian Defence): 4.Ne5 Nf6 5.Be2 Be7 6.Bh5+ Kf8! 7.Nf7 Qe8 8.Nxh8 Nxh5 9.Nc3 Kg8

Black lost castling and exchanged its rook with white knight and bishop, but kingside is solid, ready to expand queenside, which is considered to be equal.

Sample continuation No. 2: 4.Nd4 Nf6 5.d3 c5 6.Nb3 exd3 7.Bxd3 d5 8.Bb5+ Nc6

Common mistake: 4.Qe2? Qe7 5.Nd4 Nc6 6.Qh5+ Kd8 7.Nxc6+ dxc6 8.Be2 Nf6 9.Qg5 h6 10.Qe3 Bxf5 11.0-0 Nd5 12.Qd4 Qd6 13.d3 Nb4

Assessment: Black is not lost here, and often allows Nf7 and sacrifice Black's kingside rook.

=== 3.d4 ===
White's 3.d4 followed by 3...fxe4 4.Nxe5 Nf6 5.Bg5 d6 leads, as usual, to sharp play. White often offers a piece sacrifice with either 6.Nc3!? or 6.Nd2!?, but Black seems to have adequate resources against both.

Black's best response is considered to be 3...fxe4.

Sample continuation No. 1: 4.Nxe5 Nf6 5.Be2 d6 6.Nc4 Be6 7.Ne3 d5 8.c4 c6 9.Nc3 Be7 10.0-0 0-0

Common mistake: 8.0-0? c5!

Sample continuation No. 2: 4.Nxe5 Nf6 5.Be2 d6 6.Ng4 Be7 7.Nc3 d5 8.Ne5 0-0 9.Bg5 c6 10.0-0 Bf5

Assessment: Black has a better pawn structure, and better bishops.

=== 3.d3 ===
This passive move does not promise White any advantage. After 3...Nc6 4.Nc3 Nf6 5.exf5 d5, Black is okay. Alternatively, 3...d6 4.Nc3 Nf6 5.g3 Be7 6.Bg2 is also considered a prudent defence by Black. Black's best response is 3...Nc6.

Sample continuation No. 1: 4.Nc3 Nc6 5.exf5 d5

Sample continuation No. 2: 4.Nc3 Nc6 5.Bg5 Bb4 6.exf5 d5 7.a3 Bxc3+ 8.bxc3 Bxf5

Assessment: Normal position that is comparable to several other openings. White has a weak pawn structure but the bishop pair. This is a tough advantage to prove, however, since White's light-squared bishop is restricted.

== See also ==
- Greco Defence
- List of chess openings
- List of chess openings named after places
