= Mating pattern =

Mating pattern may refer to:

- Checkmate pattern, a game-winning arrangement of chess pieces
- Mating system, sexual reproductive behavior within a group of organisms
