= Checkmate pattern =

Chess patterns

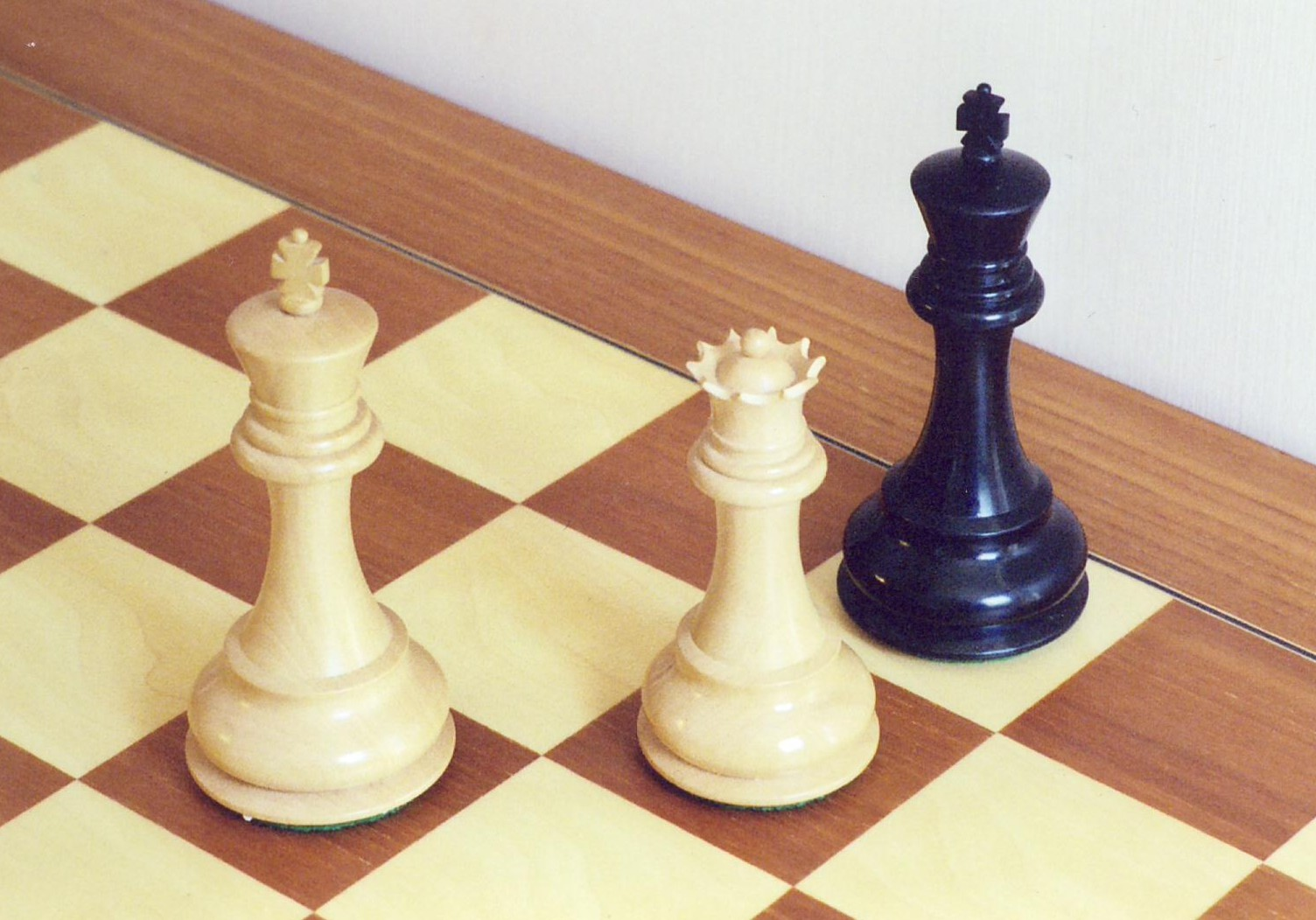
Checkmate

In chess literature, certain recognizable or studied arrangements of pieces that deliver checkmate, termed checkmate patterns, have been given specific names. The diagrams that follow show these checkmates with White checkmating Black.

== Anastasia's mate ==
Position: e7 white knight, g7 black pawn, h7 black king, h5 white rook

An archetypal Anastasia's mate

In Anastasia's mate, a knight and rook team up to trap the opposing king between the side of the board on one side and a friendly piece on the other. Often, the queen or a rook is first sacrificed along the a-file or h-file to achieve the position. A bishop can be used instead of a knight to the same effect (see Greco's mate). This checkmate gets its name from the novel Anastasia und das Schachspiel by Johann Jakob Wilhelm Heinse, but the novelist took the chess position from an essay by Giambattista Lolli.

== Anderssen's mate ==
Position: g8 black king, h8 white rook, g7 white pawn, f6 white king

An archetypal Anderssen's mate

In Anderssen's mate (named for Adolf Anderssen), the rook or queen is supported by a diagonally attacking piece such as a pawn or bishop as it checkmates the opposing king along the eighth rank.

Sometimes a distinction is drawn between Anderssen's mate, where the rook is supported by a pawn (which itself is supported by another piece, as in the diagram), and Mayet's mate, where the rook is supported by a distant bishop.

== Arabian mate ==
Position: h8 black king, h7 white rook, f6 white knight

An archetypal Arabian mate

In the Arabian mate, the knight and the rook team up to trap the opposing king on a corner of the board. The rook sits on a square adjacent to the king both to prevent escape along the diagonal and to deliver checkmate while the knight sits two squares away diagonally from the king to prevent escape on the square next to the king and to protect the rook.

In addition to being among the most common mating patterns, the Arabian mate is also an important topic in the context of history of chess for being mentioned in an ancient Arabic manuscript dating from the 8th century CE. The pattern is also derived from an older form of chess in which the knight and the rook were the two most powerful pieces in the game, before chess had migrated to Europe and the queen given its current powers of movement.

== Back-rank mate ==
Position: d8 white rook, g8 black king, f7 black pawn, g7 black pawn, h7 black pawn

An archetypal back-rank mate

The back-rank mate occurs when a rook or queen checkmates a king that is blocked in by its own pieces (usually pawns) on the first or eighth rank.

== Balestra mate ==
Position: g8 black king, e6 white bishop, h6 white queen

An archetypal balestra mate

The balestra mate involves a queen cutting off the king's escape both diagonally and vertically while having a bishop deliver checkmate.

== Bishop and knight mate ==
Position: h8 black king, f6 white bishop, g6 white king, h6 white knight

An archetypal bishop and knight mate

The bishop and knight mate is one of the four basic checkmates and occurs when the king works together with a bishop and knight to force the opponent king to the corner of the board. The bishop and knight endgame can be difficult to master: some positions may require up to 34 moves (if both sides play perfectly) before checkmate can be delivered.

== Blackburne's mate ==
Position: f8 black rook, g8 black king, h7 white bishop, g5 white knight, b2 white bishop

An archetypal Blackburne's mate

Position: h8 black king, f7 white bishop, g5 white knight, b2 white bishop

An alternative version of Blackburne's mate

Blackburne's mate is named for Joseph Henry Blackburne and is a rare method of checkmating. The checkmate utilizes enemy pieces (typically a rook) and/or the edge of the board, together with a friendly knight, to confine the enemy king's sideways escape, while a friendly bishop pair takes the remaining two diagonals off from the enemy king. Threatening Blackburne's mate, which sometimes goes in conjunction with a queen sacrifice, can be used to weaken Black's position.

== Blind swine mate ==
White mates in 3 moves

Position: f8 black rook, g8 black king, b7 white rook, e7 white rook, g7 black pawn, h7 black pawn

Position prior to a blind swine mate
An archetypal blind swine mate

Position: f8 black rook, g8 black king, g7 white rook, h7 white rook

Final position after 3 moves

The blind swine mate pattern's name is attributed to Polish master Dawid Janowski who referred to doubled rooks on a player's 7th rank as "swine". In the first diagram with White to play, White can force checkmate as follows:

1. Rxg7+ Kh8
2. Rxh7+ Kg8
3. Rbg7#

In the first diagrammed position, the rooks on White's 7th rank can start on any two files from a to e, and although black pawns are commonly present as shown, they are not necessary to deliver the mate. The f8-rook is necessary to stop the king from escaping if the attacking side does not already have a piece controlling that flight square. The second diagram shows the final position after checkmate. In the book My System, Nimzowitsch refers to this type of mate as: "The seventh rank, absolute."

== Boden's mate ==
Position: c8 black king, d8 black rook, d7 black pawn, a6 white bishop, f4 white bishop

An archetypal Boden's mate

Boden's mate involves two attacking bishops on criss-crossing diagonals delivering checkmate to a king obstructed by friendly pieces, usually a rook and a pawn.

== Corner mate ==
Position: h8 black king, f7 white knight, h7 black pawn, g1 white rook

An archetypal corner mate

The corner mate is a common method of checkmating. It works by confining the king to the corner using a rook or queen with a pawn blocking the final escape square and using a minor piece to engage the checkmate.

If the attacking player's king is used to confine the other king, and the checkmate is delivered by a knight, the mating pattern is called Stamma's mate.

== Damiano's bishop mate ==
White mates in 4 moves

Position: g8 black king, f7 black pawn, h7 black pawn, h6 white queen, f5 white bishop

1.Bxh7+ Kh8 2.Bg6+ Kg8 3.Qh7+ Kf8 4.Qxf7#
Final position after 4 moves

Position: f8 black king, f7 white queen, g6 white bishop

An archetypal Damiano's bishop mate

Damiano's bishop mate is a classic method of checkmating. The checkmate utilizes a queen and bishop, where the bishop is used to support the queen and the queen is used to engage the checkmate. The checkmate is named after Pedro Damiano.

One can also think of similar mates like 'Damiano's knight' and 'Damiano's rook', or even 'Damiano's king' (See Queen mate below), 'Damiano's pawn', or 'Damiano's (second) queen'.

== Damiano's mate ==
Position: f8 black rook, g8 black king, g7 black pawn, h7 white queen, g6 white pawn

An archetypal Damiano's mate

Damiano's mate is a classic method of checkmating and one of the oldest. It works by confining the king with a pawn and using a queen to execute the checkmate. Damiano's mate is often arrived at by first sacrificing a rook on the h-file, then checking the king with the queen on the a-file or h-file, and then moving in for the mate. The checkmate was first published by Pedro Damiano in 1512. In Damiano's publication, he failed to place the white king on the board, which resulted in it not being entered into many chess databases due to their rejection of illegal positions.

== Double bishop mate ==
Position: h8 black king, h7 black pawn, d5 white bishop, c3 white bishop

An archetypal double bishop mate

The double bishop mate is a classic method of checkmating. It is similar to Boden's mate, but the two bishops are placed on parallel diagonals. The escape squares are occupied or controlled by enemy pieces.

== Double knight mate ==
White mates in 2 moves

Position: b8 black king, c8 black knight, a7 black pawn, b7 black pawn, c7 black pawn, e6 white knight, f6 white knight

Position prior to being mated
Final position

Position: a8 black king, c8 black knight, a7 black pawn, b7 black pawn, c7 white knight, d7 white knight

A possible double knight mate

The double knight mate usually involves a king being trapped behind a pawn or a group of pawns in front of it and blocked by a piece to the side. The king is then checked by a knight and forced into a position in which it can be checkmated by the other knight.

In the diagram, White mates Black through 1. Nd7+ Ka8 2. Nxc7#.

== Dovetail mate (Cozio's mate) ==
An archetypal dovetail mate

Position: b6 white queen, g4 black pawn, h4 black king, f3 black queen, g1 white king

After 1.Qh6+, Black is forced to play 1...Kg3.

Position: g4 black pawn, f3 black queen, g3 black king, h2 white queen, g1 white king

White then checkmates with 2.Qh2#.

The dovetail mate is a common method of checkmating, and is also known as Cozio's mate, named after a study by Carlo Cozio published in 1766. It involves trapping the black king in the pattern shown. It does not matter how the queen is supported and it does not matter which type Black's other two pieces are so long as neither is an unpinned knight. See also Swallow's tail mate.

== Epaulette mate ==
Polgár, No. 193

Position: f8 black rook, g8 black king, h8 black rook, b1 white queen, g1 white king

White to move, mate in one. The solution, 1.Qg6#, is an epaulette mate.
Carlsen vs. Ernst, 2004

Position: f8 black rook, a7 black pawn, b7 black pawn, d7 white queen, f7 black king, f6 black rook, a5 black queen, c5 black pawn, d4 white pawn, g3 white rook, a2 white pawn, b2 white pawn, c2 white pawn, f2 white pawn, g2 white pawn, b1 white king

Final position after 29.Qd7#

The epaulette mate is, in its broadest definition, a checkmate where two parallel retreat squares for a checked king are occupied by its own pieces, preventing its escape. The most common epaulette mate involves the king on its back rank, trapped between two rooks. The perceived visual similarity between the rooks and epaulettes, ornamental shoulder pieces worn on military uniforms, gives the checkmate its name. In a compendium of problems by chess teacher and educational psychologist László Polgár, two elementary mate-in-one problems were given, with the solutions being epaulette mates.

Example game

In the game Magnus Carlsen–Sipke Ernst, Wijk aan Zee 2004, future world champion Carlsen, then aged thirteen, achieved an unusual "sideways" epaulette mate against Ernst on his way to winning the C Group at the Corus chess tournament in 2004.

== Greco's mate ==
Position: h8 black king, g7 black pawn, h5 white queen, c4 white bishop

An archetypal Greco's mate

Greco's mate is a common method of checkmating. The checkmate is named after the famous Italian checkmate cataloguer Gioachino Greco. It works by using the bishop to contain the black king by use of the black g-pawn and subsequently using the queen or a rook to checkmate the king by moving it to the edge of the board.

== Hook mate ==
Position: e8 white rook, e7 black king, f7 black pawn, f6 white knight, e5 white pawn

An archetypal hook mate

The hook mate involves the use of a rook, knight, and pawn along with one enemy pawn to limit the enemy king's escape. The rook is protected by the knight, and the knight is protected by the pawn, while the pawn also attacks one of the enemy king's escape squares.

== Kill box mate ==
Position: a6 white rook, a5 black king, c4 white queen

The kill box mate

The kill box mate is a box-shaped checkmate. The checkmate is delivered by a rook with the queen's assistance. The rook is adjacent to the king, while the queen supports the rook, being separated from it by one empty square on the same diagonal as the rook. This forms a 3 by 3 box shape, inside which the enemy king is trapped. The king could be anywhere on the board, but must have no escape squares available to him due either to being on the edge of the board or to being blocked off by friendly or enemy pieces.

== King and two bishops mate ==
Position: h8 black king, e6 white bishop, f6 white bishop, h6 white king

A typical king and two bishops mate

The king and two bishops mate is one of the four basic checkmates. It occurs when the king with two bishops force the bare king to the corner of the board to force a possible mate.

== King and two knights mate ==
Position: h8 black king, f6 white knight, g6 white knight, h6 white king

Checkmate with a king and two knights, but it cannot be forced.

In a two knights endgame, the side with the king and two knights cannot checkmate a bare king by force. This endgame should be a draw if the bare king plays correctly. A mate occurs only if the player with the bare king blunders. In some circumstances, if the side with the bare king instead has a pawn, it is possible to set up this type of checkmate.

== Ladder mate ==
Position: a8 white rook, g8 black king, b7 white rook

A typical ladder mate

Position: a8 white queen, g8 black king, b7 white rook

An alternate pattern with a queen and rook

The ladder mate, also known as a lawnmower mate, staircase mate, and the rook roller is by far one of the most common checkmate patterns. In this mate, two major pieces (which can be two queens, two rooks or one rook and one queen) work together to push the enemy king to one side of the board.

== Légal's mate ==
Position: d8 black queen, f8 black bishop, e7 black king, f7 white bishop, d6 black pawn, d5 white knight, e5 white knight

An archetypal Légal's mate

Position: d8 black queen, f8 black bishop, e7 black king, f7 white bishop, d6 black pawn, e5 white knight, g5 white bishop

An alternative pattern, with the mate delivered by a bishop

In Légal's mate, two knights and a bishop coordinate to administer checkmate. Alternatively, the mate may be delivered by a bishop on g5.

== Lolli's mate ==
Position: g8 black king, f7 black pawn, g7 white queen, f6 white pawn, g6 black pawn

An archetypal Lolli's mate

Lolli's mate is a common method of checkmating. The checkmate involves infiltrating Black's fianchetto position using both a pawn and queen. The queen often gets to the h6-square by means of sacrifices on the h-file. It is named after Giambattista Lolli.

== Max Lange's mate ==
White mates in 4 moves

Position: h8 black king, g7 black pawn, h6 black pawn, a4 white queen, c4 white bishop

1.Qe8+ Kh7 2.Bg8+ Kh8 3.Bf7+ Kh7 4.Qg8#
An archetypal Max Lange's mate

Position: g8 white queen, f7 white bishop, g7 black pawn, h7 black king, h6 black pawn

Final position after 4 moves
Anderssen vs. Lange, 1859

Position: a8 black rook, e8 black king, a7 black pawn, b7 black pawn, c7 black pawn, f7 black pawn, g7 black pawn, c5 black bishop, d5 black pawn, e5 white pawn, h5 white pawn, e4 black queen, b3 white bishop, d3 black pawn, f3 white queen, a2 white pawn, b2 white pawn, c2 white pawn, d2 white pawn, g2 white pawn, a1 white rook, b1 white knight, c1 white bishop, h1 white king

17...Qh4+ 18.Qh3 Qe1+ 19.Kh2 Bg1+ 20.Kh1 Bf2+ 21.Kh2 Qg1#

Max Lange's mate is named after Max Lange, who first used it in a game against Adolf Anderssen. In this mating pattern, the queen delivers the check, supported by a bishop that both defends the queen and covers an escape square.

== Mayet's mate ==
Position: g8 black king, h8 white rook, f7 black pawn, b2 white bishop

An archetypal Mayet's mate

Mayet's mate involves the use of a rook attacking the black king supported by a bishop. It often comes about after the black king castles on its kingside in a fianchetto position. White usually arrives at this position after a series of sacrifices on the a-file or h-file. It is a type of Anderssen's mate and closely resembles the Opera mate. The "h-file" mate is an apt description, but the pattern is properly called "Mayet's mate" after the German player Carl Mayet. See variation description in Anderssen's mate given above.

== Morphy's mate ==
White mates in 5 moves

Position: f8 black rook, g8 black king, f7 black pawn, g7 black pawn, h7 black pawn, b2 white bishop, g1 white rook

1.Rxg7+ Kh8 2.Rxf7+ Kg8 3.Rg7+ Kh8 4.Rg1+ Rf6 5.Bxf6#
An archetypal Morphy's mate

Position: h8 black king, h7 black pawn, f6 white bishop, g1 white rook

Final position after 5 moves

Morphy's mate is a common method of checkmating. It was named after Paul Morphy. It works by using the bishop to attack the black king and a rook and Black's own pawn to confine it. In many respects it is very similar to the corner mate.

With a bishop on f6, it’s a straightforward mate in two moves: 1.Rxg7+ Kh8 2.Rg6# (or any other square on the g-file except g8).

== Opera mate ==
Position: d8 white rook, e8 black king, f7 black pawn, g5 white bishop

An archetypal opera mate

The opera mate is a common method of checkmating. It works by attacking an uncastled king on the back rank with a rook using a bishop to protect it. An enemy pawn or a piece other than a knight is used to restrict the enemy king's movement. It is a type of Anderssen's mate and closely resembles Mayet's mate. The checkmate was named after its implementation by Paul Morphy in 1858 in a game at the Paris opera against Duke Karl of Brunswick and Count Isouard.

== Pawn mate (David and Goliath mate) ==
Position: h5 white rook, a4 black pawn, b4 black king, c4 black pawn, a3 white pawn, b3 black knight, b2 white pawn

An archetypal pawn mate

The pawn mate, also known as the David and Goliath mate, is a common method of checkmating. Although the pawn mate can take many forms, it is characterized generally as a mate in which a pawn is the final attacking piece and where enemy pawns are nearby. Its alternate name is taken from the biblical account of David and Goliath.

== Pillsbury's mate ==
White mates in 3 moves

Position: f8 black rook, g8 black king, f7 black pawn, h7 black pawn, f6 black pawn, h6 white bishop, h1 white rook

1.Rg1+ Kh8 2.Bg7+ Kg8 3.Bxf6#
An archetypal Pillsbury's mate

Position: f8 black rook, g8 black king, f7 black pawn, h7 black pawn, f6 white bishop, g1 white rook

Final position after 3 moves

Pillsbury's mate is a common method of checkmating and is named for Harry Nelson Pillsbury. It works by attacking the king with the rook while the bishop is cutting off the king. It is very similar to Morphy's mate, in fact in some ways they are interchangeable, the main difference is that in Pillsbury's mate, the bishop could be on h6.

== Queen mate ==
Position: d8 black king, d7 white queen, d6 white king

A typical queen mate

The queen mate is one of the four basic checkmates. It occurs when the side with the king and queen force the bare king to the edge or corner of the board. The queen checkmates the bare king with the support of the allied king.

In line with Damiano's bishop mate earlier, this could be seen as 'Damiano's king mate'.

== Rainbow mate ==
Dodge vs. Houghteling, 1905

Position: a8 black rook, h8 black rook, a7 black pawn, b7 black pawn, c7 black pawn, d7 black king, f7 black pawn, g7 black pawn, h7 black pawn, c4 white pawn, c3 white knight, d3 black bishop, e3 black bishop, f3 white knight, a2 white pawn, b2 white pawn, c2 black knight, d2 white king, f2 black knight, g2 white pawn, h2 white pawn, b1 white rook, c1 white bishop, f1 white bishop, h1 white rook

The original rainbow mate
Sultanov vs. Kamaletdinov, 2011

Position: e8 black king, f8 black bishop, g8 black rook, a7 black pawn, b7 black pawn, c7 white knight, f7 white knight, g7 black pawn, c6 black bishop, d6 white bishop, e6 white bishop, f6 black knight, h6 black pawn, f3 white pawn, a2 white pawn, b2 white pawn, g2 white pawn, h2 white pawn, a1 white rook, e1 white rook, g1 white king

The knight delivering mate

The rainbow mate is a picturesque and unusual checkmating pattern, first seen in the game Dodge–Houghteling, Chicago 1905. The attacker's four minor pieces (two bishops and two knights) are arranged in a rainbow-like arc, e.g. knights on c2 and f2, bishops on d3 and e3, with the bishops next to each other, and each protected by a knight. Mate may be delivered by either a bishop or knight. Each of the four minor pieces is necessary to effectuate mate. One of the mated king's pieces may also be necessary in order to seal off a flight square. Other instances of this mate include Sultanov–Kamalmetdinov, 2011, NN–Wahlund, 2007, and Clark–Burgess, 1989. A variant of it was seen in Malinin-Savinov, 1988.

Malinin-Savinov, 1988

Position: c7 white knight, e7 black king, h7 white knight, d6 black pawn, e6 white bishop, f6 white bishop, g6 black pawn, a5 black queen, c5 black pawn, b4 black rook, f3 white king, g3 white pawn, a2 white pawn, h1 white rook

A variant of the standard rainbow mate.

== Réti's mate ==
Position: b8 black knight, c8 black bishop, d8 white bishop, b7 black pawn, c7 black king, c6 black pawn, d1 white rook

An archetypal Réti's mate

Réti's mate is a famous method of checkmating. The checkmate is named after Richard Réti, who delivered it in an 11-move game against Savielly Tartakower in 1910 in Vienna. It works by trapping the enemy king with four of its own pieces that are situated on flight squares and then attacking it with a bishop that is protected by a rook or queen.

== Rook mate (box mate) ==
Position: a8 white rook, d8 black king, d6 white king

A typical rook mate

The rook mate is one of the four basic checkmates. It occurs when the side with the king and rook box in the bare king to the corner or edge of the board. The mate is delivered by the rook along the edge rank or file, and escape towards the center of the board is blocked by the king.

== Smothered mate ==
Position: g8 black rook, h8 black king, f7 white knight, g7 black pawn, h7 black pawn

A typical smothered mate

Smothered mate is a common method of checkmating. It occurs when a knight checkmates a king that is smothered (surrounded) by his own pieces and he has nowhere to move nor is there any way to capture the knight. One common checkmating pattern finishing with a smothered mate is known as Philidor's mate or Philidor's legacy after François-André Danican Philidor, though its documentation predates Philidor by several hundred years.

== Stamma's mate ==
Stamma's mate

Position: a3 black pawn, d3 white knight, a2 black king, c2 white king

White wins with either side to move.

Stamma's mate (named for Philipp Stamma) is a rare endgame pattern in which a player is able to force mate with only a king and knight, due to the opponent's king being trapped in front of an advanced rook's pawn.

In the diagram, White to move wins:

1. Nb4+ Ka1
2. Kc1 a2
3. Nc2#

White also wins if Black is to move first:

1... Ka1
2. Nc1 a2
3. Nb3#

== Suffocation mate ==
Position: f8 black rook, g8 black king, e7 white knight, f7 black pawn, h7 black pawn, c3 white bishop

An archetypal suffocation mate

The suffocation mate is a common method of checkmating. It works by using the knight to attack the enemy king, and the bishop or queen to confine the king's escape routes.

== Swallow's tail mate (guéridon mate) ==
Position: d8 black rook, f8 black rook, e7 black king, a6 white rook, e6 white queen

An archetypal swallow's tail mate

Position: b8 black bishop, d8 black queen, c7 black king, c6 white queen, f3 white bishop

Other archetypal swallow's tail mate

The swallow's tail mate, also known as the guéridon mate, is a common method of checkmating. It works by attacking the enemy king with a queen that is protected by a rook or other piece. The enemy king's own pieces (in this example, rooks) block its means of escape. It resembles the epaulette mate.

== Triangle mate ==
Position: d8 white rook, e7 black king, f7 black pawn, d6 white queen

An archetypal triangle mate

The triangle mate involves a queen, supported by a rook on the same file two squares away, delivering checkmate to a king that is either at the edge of the board or whose escape is blocked by a piece; the queen, rook, and king together form a triangular shape, hence the name of the mating pattern.

== Vuković's mate ==
Position: e8 black king, e7 white rook, e6 white knight, f6 white king

An archetypal Vuković's mate

Vuković’s mate is a mate involving a protected rook which delivers checkmate to the king at the edge of the board, while a knight covers the remaining escape squares of the king. The rook is usually protected with either the king or a pawn.

This pattern was famously used by 13-year-old Bobby Fischer in 1956 to checkmate Donald Byrne in what is now commonly known as the Game of the Century.

== See also ==
- Outline of chess § Checkmate patterns
- Fool's mate
- Scholar's mate
