= Luigi Tarisio =

Italian violin dealer and collector (1796 - 1854)

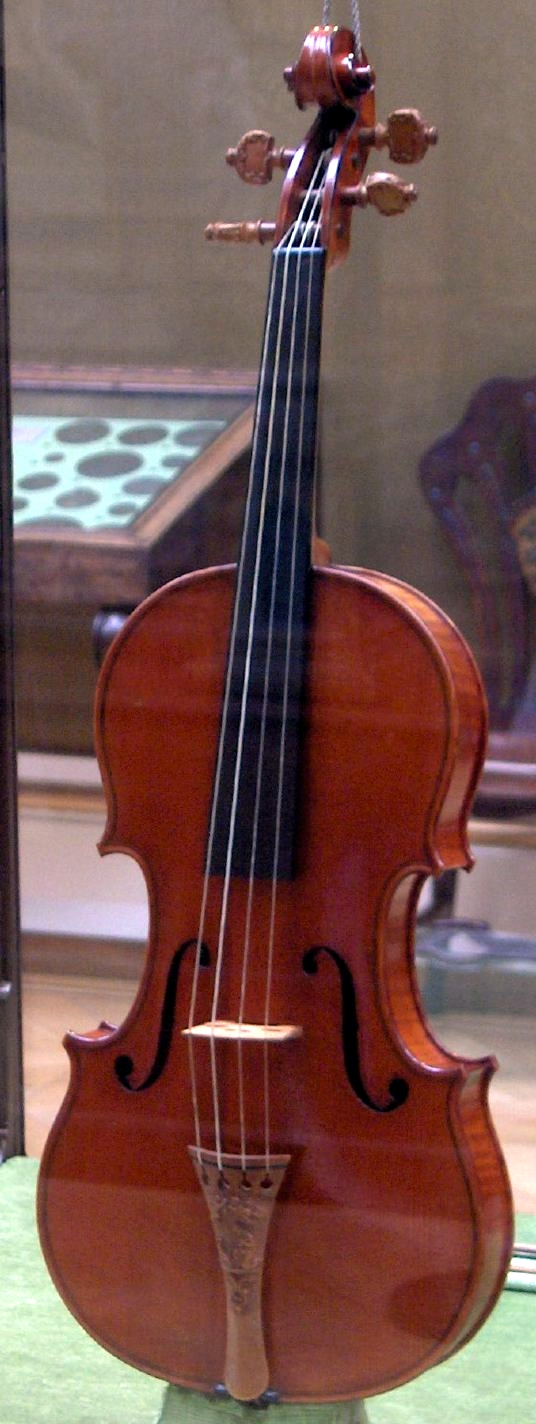
Messiah Stradivarius

Luigi Tarisio (Fontaneto d'Agogna (Novara) - 21 June 1796 – Milan - 1 November 1854) was an Italian violin dealer and collector.

== Early life ==
He was of humble parents and is said to have trained as a carpenter, playing violin as a hobby.

== Career ==
He developed an interest in violins themselves, and as a connoisseur with a natural talent for business he began to acquire and resell some of the many fine instruments that were lying unused in the towns and villages of northern Italy.

From 1827 to 1846, he brought a large number of genuine Amati, Stradivari and Guarneri violins from Italy to London and Paris. His first journey to Paris, in 1827, was evidently profitable for him and for the dealers there, who gave him every encouragement.

In 1828 he made his greatest coup, acquiring a number of violins from Count Cozio of Salabue, including a 1716 Stradivari in unused condition. This violin was Tarisio's treasure, and as he spoke of it on every visit to Paris but never actually brought it with him; it came to be known as the 'Messiah'.

Tarisio searched indefatigably for violins and had a true love of them. The novelist Charles Reade, who knew him, wrote:

"...'The man's whole soul was in fiddles. He was a great dealer, but a greater amateur, for he had gems by him no money would buy'.

There was an insatiable demand in northern Europe for what nobody wanted or appreciated in the south, and the absence of much competition gave him unique opportunities. By bringing his stock to Paris, the only place where the art of restoration was at all advanced, he rescued many great instruments for posterity.

== Legacy ==
After his death it was the turn of Jean Baptiste Vuillaume, the leading Parisian dealer, to make the greatest purchase of his life. At a small farm near Fontaneto d'Agogna, where Tarisio's relatives lived, were the six finest violins of the collection, including the celebrated 'Messiah'; and in a dingy attic in Milan, where Tarisio's body has been found, were no fewer than 24 Stradivaris and 120 other Italian masterpieces. It is not certain that the entire collection was sold by the heirs of Tarisio.

The auction house for valuable instruments, founded in 1999 in New York and London, is called Tarisio.

== Biography ==
- The Violin Hunter: The Life Story of Luigi Tarisio the Great Collector of Violins by William Alexander Silverman
