= Carlo Cozio =

Italian chess player

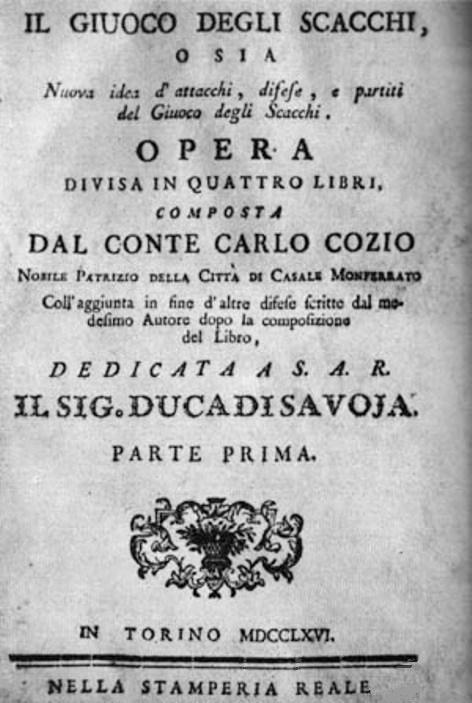
- Born: c. 1715; Casale Monferrato, Duchy of Savoy
- Died: c. 1780
- Occupation: chess player
- Spouse: Donna Taddea dei Marchesi di Barbiano di Chieri
- Children: Ignazio Alessandro

Carlo Cozio, Count of Montiglio and Salabue (c. 1715 – c. 1780) was an Italian chess player and theorist. He is best remembered for the book Il giuoco degli scacchi, and for the Cozio Defence.

== Life ==
Carlo Cozio was born in Casale Monferrato around 1715. He married Donna Taddea dei Marchesi di Barbiano di Chieri and by her had one son: Count Ignazio Alessandro Cozio di Salabue (1755–1840) who became a famous collector of violins.

In 1740 he completed the manuscript of Il Giuoco degli Scacchi o sia Nuova idea di attacchi, difese e partiti del Giuoco degli Scacchi, which was published in 1766 in Turin by the Stamperia Reale as two volumes amounting together to 700 pages. He is also known for Cozio's mate.

Carlo Cozio died around 1780.
