= Muntz Stradivarius =

Antique violin crafted by Antonio Stradivari in 1736

The Muntz Stradivarius is an antique violin crafted by Antonio Stradivari of Cremona (1644–1737) in 1736. The label affixed to this instrument bears the inscription, “d'anni 92” (92 years old), possibly handwritten by Stradivari himself. It has also been suggested that Count Cozio di Salabue, a subsequent owner, made this inscription. The Muntz which has a solid reputation for its excellent condition and tonal quality, takes its name from a man who owned it in the late 19th century, H. M. Muntz. He was a collector and amateur violinist who lived in Birmingham, England. The Muntz, among the last of the instruments made by Stradivari, is currently owned by the Nippon Music Foundation.

Since 2007, the Muntz Stradivarius has been leased to Yuki Manuela Janke, concertmaster of the Staatskapelle Dresden.
