= Messiah Stradivarius =

1716 violin made by Antonio Stradivari

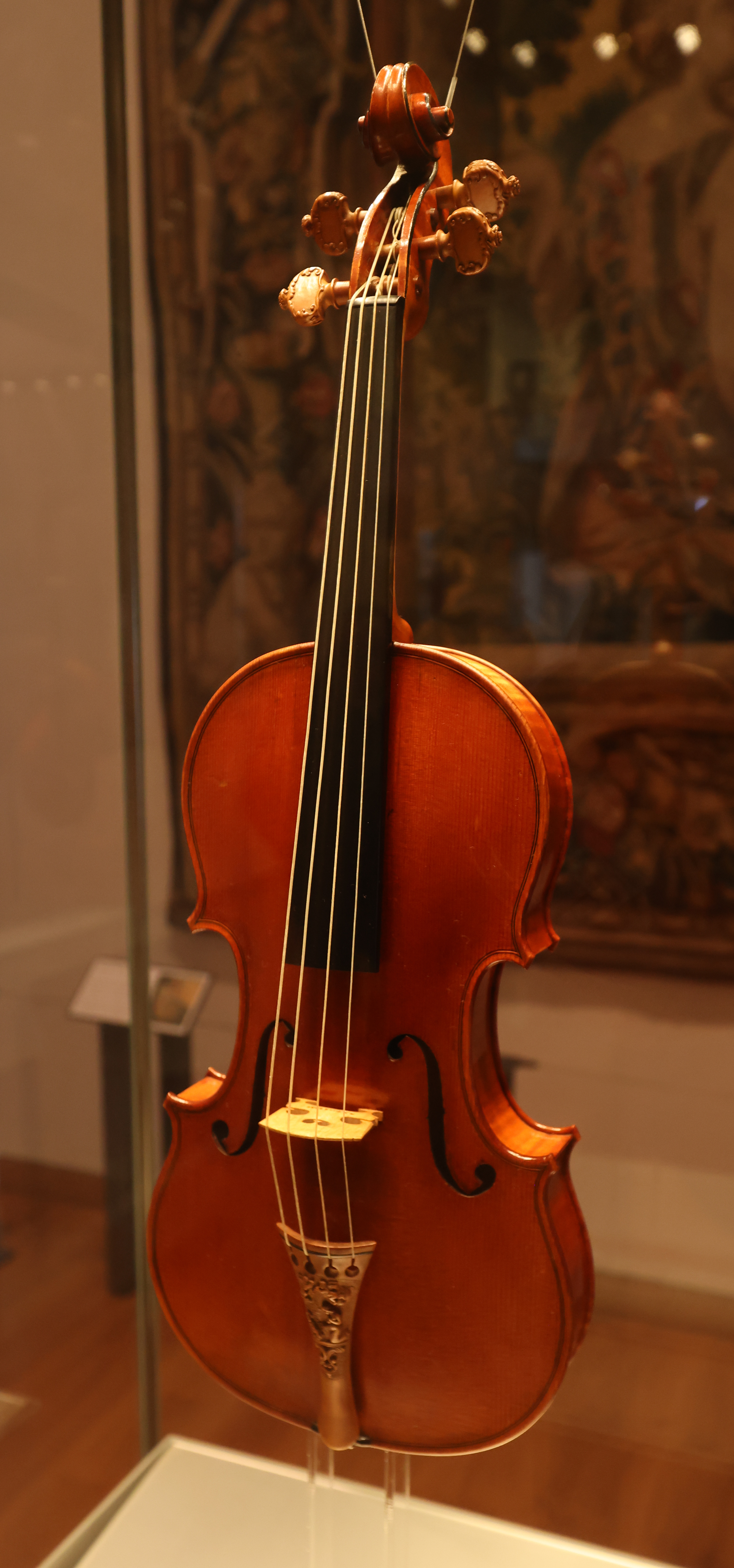
The Messiah on display at the Ashmolean Museum

The Messiah - Salabue Stradivarius of 1716 is a violin made by the Italian luthier Antonio Stradivari of Cremona. It is considered to be the only Stradivarius in existence in as "new" state. The neck has been lengthened and at minimum the bass bar, bridge, tailpiece, and pegs have been replaced. It is in the collection of the Ashmolean Museum in Oxford, England.

The violin, known as the Messiah (Messie in French), remained in Stradivari's workshop until his death in 1737. It was then sold by his son Paolo to Count Cozio di Salabue in 1775, and for a time, the violin bore the name Salabue. The instrument was then purchased by Luigi Tarisio in 1827. Upon Tarisio’s death in 1854, the French luthier Jean Baptiste Vuillaume of Paris purchased The Messiah along with Tarisio's entire collection. "One day Tarisio was discoursing with Vuillaume on the merits of this unknown and marvelous instrument, when the violinist Jean-Delphin Alard, Vuillaume's son-in-law, exclaimed: 'Really, Mister Tarisio, your violin is like the Messiah of the Jews: one always expects him but he never appears' ('Vraiment, Monsieur Tarisio, votre violon est comme le Messie des Juifs: on l'attend toujours, mais il ne paraît jamais'). Thus the violin was titled with the name by which it is still known."

The Messiah was bequeathed by the family of W. E. Hill to the Ashmolean Museum in Oxford for preservation as "a yardstick for future violin makers to learn from".

== Condition ==
The violin is in like-new condition, as it was seldom played. Although modifications were made, according to the Ashmolean Museum, "The varnish, however, is almost unworn, the carving is as crisp as the day it was made and the painted edge-work on the scroll survives intact."

== List of modifications ==
- Neck was lengthened
- Bass bar was replaced (the original is displayed next to the violin)
- Bridge replaced
- Tailpiece replaced
- Pegs replaced
- Sound post likely replaced
- Strings likely replaced

The neck was lengthened in the 19th century, likely due to pitch inflation. This in turn necessitated replacement of the bass bar to counteract the increased downforce from higher-tension strings (plus from any increase in break angle of the strings over the new bridge). The bridge, tailpiece and pegs were also added in the 19th century. One may assume the strings and sound post are not original as well—both are regularly replaced with use and age, plus a longer neck needs longer strings.

== Sound ==
The tonal potential of the instrument has been questioned due to the conditions of the Hill bequest. However it was played by the famous violinist Joseph Joachim, who stated in a letter of 1891 to the then owner of the Messiah, Robert Crawford, that he was "struck by the combined sweetness and grandeur of the sound". Nathan Milstein played it at the Hills' shop before 1940 and described it as an unforgettable experience. It is one of the most valuable of all the Stradivari instruments.

== Construction ==
The top of the Messiah is made from the same tree as a P.G. Rogeri violin of 1710. The tuning pegs and the tailpiece (that shows the Nativity of Christ) are not original, but were added by Vuillaume.

== See also ==
- List of Stradivarius instruments
