= Ignazio Alessandro Cozio di Salabue =

Italian violin collector (1755–1840)

Count Ignazio Alessandro Cozio di Salabue
- Count Cozio de Salabue
- Born: 1755; Casale Monferrato, Sardinia
- Died: 1840 (aged 84–85)
- Known for: Violin collector

Count Ignazio Alessandro Cozio di Salabue (1755–1840) was an Italian nobleman who was known as the first great connoisseur and collector of violins. A trove of correspondence and memoirs on the history of violinmaking known as the Carteggio forms the basis of his biography. Cozio's meticulous notes on nearly every instrument that passed through his hands contributed enormously to the body of knowledge surrounding Italian violinmaking.

== Early life and education ==
Cozio was born in the Piedmontese town of Casale Monferrato to an aristocratic and intellectual family. The count's father Carlo Cozio owned an Amati violin, which may have piqued Cozio's fascination with violinmaking.

== Career ==
In 1771, Cozio attended the military academy in Turin, where he became acquainted with Giovanni Battista Guadagnini, the famous violin maker. Guadagnini became a principal figure in Cozio's education about the history of violinmaking and his acquisition of instruments.

The Count's aristocratic status formally prohibited him from direct buying and selling of instruments, so much of his business correspondence was carried out through intermediaries. Letters sent via Cozio's primary agent Guido Anselmi indicate that in 1774 Cozio and Guadagnini entered into a contractual agreement for the production of new violins. Over the next three years, Guadagnini built over 50 instruments for Cozio which represent a salient portion of his output. Cozio sold some of these instruments, many through the Turin shop of Boch and Gravier, but was never able to find a suitable market for Guadagnini's output in his lifetime. Around 1776 their relationship began to deteriorate, perhaps because of delays in payment to Guadagnini and mutual dissatisfaction with the terms of the contract. In spite of the rancor that ended the contract in 1777, Cozio acted as Guadagnini's primary patron, and facilitated Guadagnini's prominent legacy in the canon of Italian violinmaking.

Following the deterioration of his relationship with Guadagnini, the primary figures in the expansion of Cozio's expertise and treasury of violins were the Mantegazza brothers, Domenico and Pietro Giovanni. Like his patronage of G.B. Guadagnini, Cozio's relationship with the Mantegazzas was a symbiotic one. They provided him with insight on craftsmanship and access to the marketplace, and he supplied them with commissions and most of his repair work. Carlo Mantegazza, son of Pietro, is frequently mentioned in the Carteggio as an unsurpassed restorer and modernizer of Cozio's historic instruments, including the unfinished stock of G.B. Guadagnini.

Finally, the prominent violin collector Luigi Tarisio occupies a central role in the history of Cozio's famous collection of instruments. In the year preceding Cozio's death in 1840 the two men undertook negotiations for the sale to Tarisio of numerous violins by Stradivari and Guadagnini. The transaction was completed by Cozio's daughter the Countess Matilda following her father's death, and the collection was dispersed.

== The Cozio Collection ==
Among the most important instruments in Cozio's collection were ten violins of Antonio Stradivari, which he acquired from the maker's son Paolo in 1773-4; however, many more instruments by Stradivari and numerous other renowned violin makers passed through his hands over the years.

The following is a partial list of important instruments that once formed part of the collection:

=== Violins by Antonio Stradivari ===
- "Dragonetti," 1706
- "Messiah", 1716
- "Szekely," "Michaelangelo," 1718
- "Jules Falk", 1723
- "Paganini," 1724
- "Salabue," 1727
- "Muntz", 1736
- "Belle Skinner," 1736

=== Violins by Giovanni Battista Guadagnini ===
- 1773 viola, "Cozio"
- 1774 viola, "Wanamaker"
- 1774 violin, "Salabue," "Berta"
- 1776 violin, "Lachmann-Schwechter"
- 1777 cello, "Simpson"
- c.1782 violin, "Salabue," "Chapman"

=== Violins by Carlo Bergonzi ===
- Bergonzi Tschudi (1733)
- Bergonzi Kreisler (1740)

=== Violins by Francesco Stradivari ===
- 1742 violin, "Salabue"

=== Stradivari tools ===
A collection of original Stradivari family tools was purchased in the 1920s from the count's descendants by violin-maker Giuseppe Fiorini who donated them to the Museo Stradivariano in Cremona.
