= Greco Defence =

Position: a8 black rook, b8 black knight, c8 black bishop, e8 black king, f8 black bishop, g8 black knight, h8 black rook, a7 black pawn, b7 black pawn, c7 black pawn, d7 black pawn, f7 black pawn, g7 black pawn, h7 black pawn, f6 black queen, e5 black pawn, e4 white pawn, f3 white knight, a2 white pawn, b2 white pawn, c2 white pawn, d2 white pawn, f2 white pawn, g2 white pawn, h2 white pawn, a1 white rook, b1 white knight, c1 white bishop, d1 white queen, e1 white king, f1 white bishop, h1 white rook
- Moves: 1.e4 e5 2.Nf3 Qf6
- ECO: C40
- Named after: Gioachino Greco
- Parent: King's Knight Opening
- Synonym: McConnell Defence

The Greco Defence (or McConnell Defence), named after Gioachino Greco (c. 1600 – c. 1634), is a chess opening that begins with the moves:

1. e4 e5
2. Nf3 Qf6

The opening is categorised by Encyclopaedia of Chess Openings as code C40.

== Discussion ==
Of the several plausible ways Black has to defend the pawn on e5, 2...Qf6 is considered one of the weaker choices, since the queen is developed prematurely and can become a target for attack. Also, the black knight on g8 is deprived of its most natural square. However, there is no obvious refutation of the opening. White's advantage consists mainly of smoother development.

Although it is a popular opening choice by novice players, it has also been used by players who, according to International Master Gary Lane, "should know better".

== Examples ==
=== Greco line ===
Greco himself illustrated the following amusing line against this defence in 1620:

1. e4 e5 2. Nf3 Qf6?! 3. Bc4 Qg6 4. 0-0 Qxe4 5. Bxf7+!! Ke7

5...Kxf7?? 6.Ng5+! wins the black queen.

6. Re1 Qf4 7. Rxe5+ Kxf7

7...Kd8 8.Re8#

8. d4 Qf6 9. Ng5+ Kg6 10. Qd3+ Kh6 11. Nf7# 1–0

=== McConnell game ===
Morphy vs. McConnell, 1849

Position: a8 black rook, b8 black knight, c8 black bishop, e8 black king, f8 black bishop, g8 black knight, h8 black rook, a7 black pawn, b7 black pawn, d7 black pawn, f7 black pawn, g7 black pawn, h7 black pawn, c6 black pawn, e6 black queen, e5 white pawn, g5 white rook, d4 white knight, c3 white knight, a2 white pawn, b2 white pawn, c2 white pawn, f2 white pawn, h2 white pawn, a1 white rook, c1 white bishop, d1 white queen, e1 white king, f1 white bishop

Position after 11.Nxd4

Morphy vs. McConnell, New Orleans 1849:

1. e4 e5 2. Nf3 Qf6 3. Nc3 c6 4. d4 exd4 5. e5 Qg6 6. Bd3

6.Qxd4! gives White a big lead in development.

6... Qxg2 7. Rg1 Qh3 8. Rg3 Qh5 9. Rg5 Qh3 10. Bf1 Qe6 11. Nxd4 (diagram)

... and Morphy was better.

=== Busch game ===
Paulsen vs. Busch, Düsseldorf 1863:

1. e4 e5 2. Nf3 Qf6 3. Bc4 Nh6

Making some sense, since Black is able to respond ...Qxh6 if White were to play d4 followed by Bxh6.

4. 0-0 Bc5 5. Nc3 c6 6. d4! Bxd4 7. Nxd4 exd4 8. e5 Qg6 9. Qxd4

And again, White is ahead in development.

== See also ==
- List of chess openings
- List of chess openings named after people
