= Flight square =

Safe square that a piece can move to if threatened

Position: e8 black rook, d6 black cross, f6 black cross, d5 black cross, e5 white king, f5 black cross, d4 black cross, f4 black cross

Flight squares are marked with crosses.

In chess, a flight square or escape square is a safe square to which a piece, especially a king, can move if it is threatened.

Providing one's piece with flight squares can prevent the opponent from winning material or delivering checkmate. For example, in the Morphy Defence, the white c-pawn may be advanced to provide White's light-squared bishop with a flight square. Conversely, it is possible to take away an enemy piece's flight squares, known as domination.

== Luft ==
Position: e8 black rook, h8 black king, b7 white rook, b3 black pawn, f2 white pawn, g2 white pawn, h2 white pawn, h1 white king

If it is Black to move, 1...Re1# is checkmate. If it is White's turn, he must create a luft by advancing either the g-pawn or h-pawn. Then after capturing the opponent's passed pawn, White should win this game.

In chess, a luft (German for "air", sometimes also "space" or "breath") designates the space or square left by a pawn move into which a king (usually a castled one) may then retreat, especially such a space made intentionally to avoid back-rank checkmate. A move leaving such a space is often said to "give the king some luft". The term "luft", "lufting", or "lufted" may also be used (as an English participle) to refer to the movement of the relevant pawn creating luft.

Preventing an opponent from lufting a pawn (for example by pinning it or moving a piece to the square in front of it) is a tactic that may lead to checkmate. A king's access to his luft might also be denied by the opponent subjecting the space or square to attack.

The German luft is a close cognate to the English "lift", which is also used in chess, e.g., rook lift.

=== Examples ===
Position: b8 black king, f8 white queen, a7 black pawn, b7 black cross, c7 black pawn, a6 black circle, b6 black pawn, c6 black circle, d6 white knight, a5 white knight, c5 white knight, d5 white bishop, f4 black bishop, g4 black knight, f3 black knight, g3 black circle, h3 white pawn, f2 white pawn, g2 white pawn, h2 black cross, c1 black queen, g1 white king

In the diagram, "X"s mark luft to which the king can escape back-rank checkmate delivered by the queen. Theoretical enemy knights in the indicated positions deny the king access to his luft. Black dots indicate squares from which diagonally moving enemy pieces could also deny access. The pawn structure seen in Black's position is less secure than White's, but it is a risk commonly accepted to fianchetto.

Position: e8 black queen, g8 black king, e7 black rook, f7 black pawn, g7 black pawn, b6 black pawn, d6 black knight, g6 white circle, a5 black pawn, c5 black pawn, d5 white bishop, c4 white pawn, f4 white knight, h4 white rook, b3 white pawn, h3 white pawn, a2 black rook, f2 white pawn, g2 white pawn, h2 white king

Being up a queen in the diagrammed position, Black will win unless the threat of Ng6, which sets up checkmate via Rh8#, is overlooked. Black would not be able to capture the knight or create luft because his f-pawn is pinned by White's bishop, and his g-pawn cannot advance if a piece is on g6 blockading it. White's king is temporarily safe from check in his luft. Black can neutralize the Ng6 threat with ...Qb8, as then Ng6 can be met by the discovered check ...Nf5+, stopping the threat of Rh8#.

== See also ==
- Pawn structure
