= Francis Beale (writer) =

English author

Francis Beale (fl. 1656) was an English author. He has been identified tentatively with the student admitted to St John's College, Cambridge of this name in 1640, who graduated B.A. at Magdalene College in 1644.

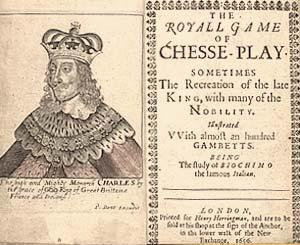
Greco's manual, as issued by Francis Beale, 1656

Beale was the author of the Royall Game of Chesse Play, sometimes the Recreation of the late King with many of the Nobility, illustrated with almost one hundred Gambetts, being the study of Biochimo, the famous Italian, London, 1656. A portrait of the late king Charles I, engraved by Stent, forms the frontispiece of the volume; the dedication is addressed to Montagu Bertie, 2nd Earl of Lindsey. The book is translated from Gioachino Greco's manuscript work on chess; it was reissued in 1750, and again in 1819 (with remarks by William Lewis).
